= Bugis =

Austronesian ethnic group

Buginese / Bugis people
To Ugi ᨈᨚ ᨕᨘᨁᨗ تَوْ أُوْڬِيْ
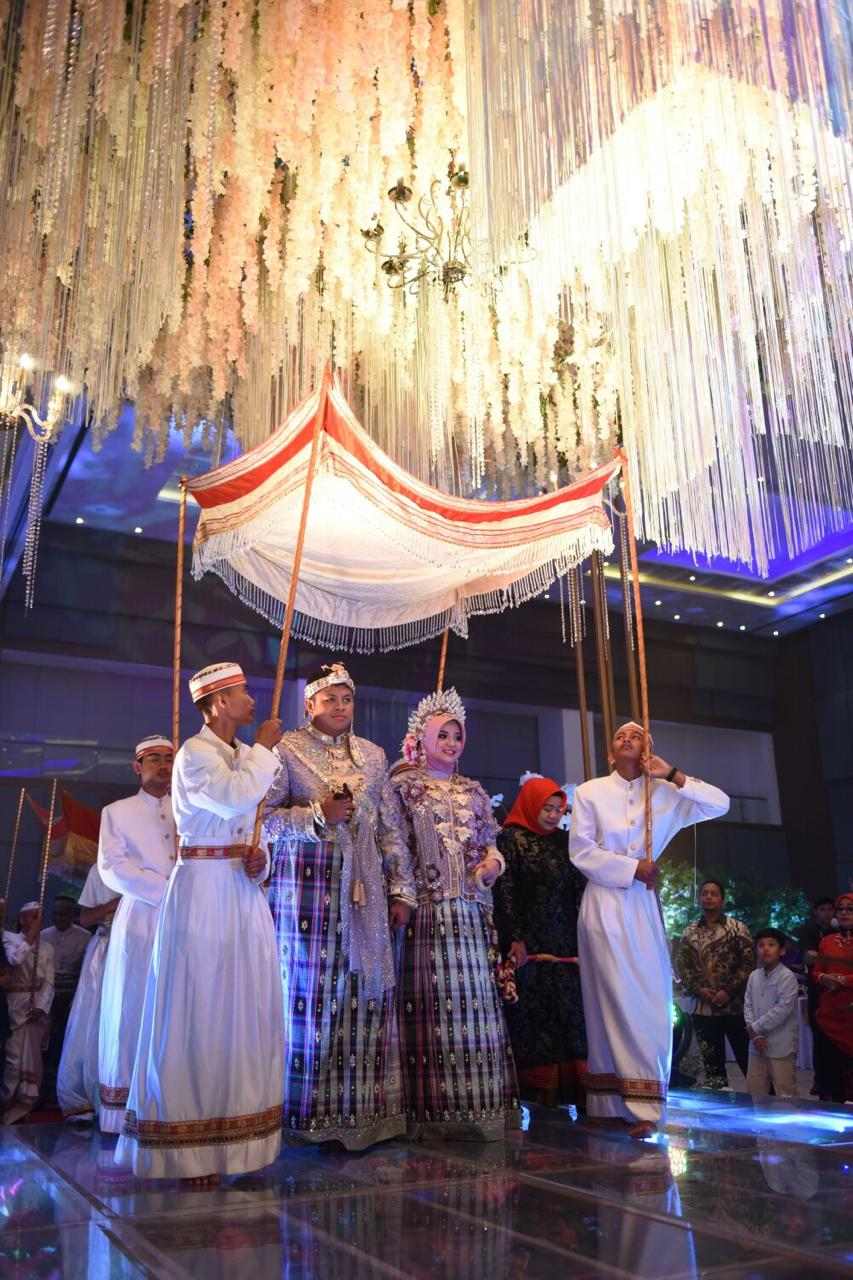
- A couple walking under a Lellu' (traditional folding canopy) at their wedding

Total population
- 7 million (2010 census)

Regions with significant populations
- Indonesia: 6,359,700
Breakdown by Province in Indonesia
South Sulawesi	3,618,683
East Kalimantan	735,819
Southeast Sulawesi	496,432
Central Sulawesi	409,741
West Sulawesi	144,554
West Kalimantan	137,282
Riau	107,159
South Kalimantan	101,727
Jambi	96,145
Papua	88,991
Jakarta	68,227
West Papua	40,087
- Malaysia: 728,465
- Singapore: 15,000

Languages
- Predominantly; Bugis • Indonesian • Makassar Malay; Also; Massenrempulu • English • Malay

Religion
- Predominantly; Islam: 99% Minorities; Christians (Protestant and Roman Catholic): 0.55% • Hindu (incl. Tolotang): 0.40% • Buddhist: 0.05%

Related ethnic groups
- Austronesian peoples; Makassarese; Mandarese; Torajan; Buginese-Malay; Loloan Malays; Kangeanese; Bawean; Madurese

The Buginese (Note: UK: /bʊɡɪˈniːz/, US: /bʊɡəˈniz/ buug-ih-NEEZ) (Buginese: To Ugi, Lontara script: ᨈᨚ ᨕᨘᨁᨗ; Serang script: تَوْ أُوْڬِيْ; Indonesian: Suku Bugis), or simply Bugis, are an Austronesian ethnic group who are the most numerous of the three major ethnolinguistic groups of South Sulawesi (the others being Makassarese and Torajan), in the south-western province of Sulawesi, third-largest island of Indonesia. The Bugis converted from animism to Islam in 1605. Small minorities adhere to Christianity or a pre-Islamic indigenous belief called Tolotang.

The Bugis, whose population numbers around six million and constitutes less than 2.5% of the Indonesian population, are influential in the politics of the country, and historically influential on the Malay Peninsula, Sumatra, Borneo, Lesser Sunda Islands and other parts of the archipelago where they have migrated en masse, starting in the late seventeenth century. The third president of Indonesia, B. J. Habibie, and a former vice president of Indonesia, Jusuf Kalla, are of Bugis descent. In Malaysia, the reigning Yang di-Pertuan Agong (King of Malaysia), Sultan Ibrahim and eighth prime minister, Muhyiddin Yassin, have Bugis ancestry.

Most Bugis people speak a distinct regional language called Bugis (Basa Ugi) in addition to Indonesian. The Bugis language belongs to the South Sulawesi language group; other members include Makassarese, Torajan, Mandarese and Massenrempulu. The name Bugis is an exonym which represents an older form of the name; (To) Ugi is the endonym.

== Etymology ==
- Endonym and exonym: The designation Bugis is classified as an exonym, referring to a term applied by external groups rather than the community itself. Within their own linguistic and cultural context, the Bugis people identify as To Ugi or To Bugis.
- Mythological associations: The origin of the term Bugis has been linked to La Sattumpugi, a central character in the South Sulawesi epic La Galigo. According to oral traditions, La Sattumpugi, a sailor and kingdom founder in Wajo, is believed to have inspired the term Ugi, which later evolved into Bugis.
- Colonial records: The term Bugis appears in colonial documentation as early as the 16th century, particularly in Portuguese sources, such as Suma Oriental.

== Origins and antecedents ==
The island of Sulawesi, shown in red

=== Toalean — Pre-Austronesian South Sulawesi ===
The earliest inhabitant of South Sulawesi is potentially related to the Wajak Man, of the Proto-Australoid origin. There are a few flake materials found in Walanae River valley and Maros, likely dating between 40,000 and 19,000 BC. The hunter-gatherer culture in South Sulawesi is also known as Toalean culture, and largely based on blade, flake and microlith complex. They are probably of Melanesoid or Australoid stock, hence related to the contemporary population of New Guinea or to Australian aborigines.

In 2015, the remains of Bessé´, a young woman, was unearthed Leang Panninge, South Sulawesi. Dated over 7,200 years old, half of her DNA was identified to be connected to the indigenous Australians, the people in New Guinea and the Western Pacific; together with a previously unknown and unique human lineage that diverged approximately 37,000 years ago. Her DNA provided important evidence pertaining to the understanding on ancient human migration.

Two pre-Austronesian foragers from the region, a Late Pleistocene individual from Leang Bulu Bettue in the Maros karst dated to between 25,000 and 16,000 years ago and a Toalean man from Leang Cappalombo 1 dated to between 7,600 and 6,300 years ago, have deep tooth grooves and chemical traces of arecoline that a 2026 study attributed to habitual sucking of whole areca nuts. The authors proposed that the Austronesian farmers who later settled the island took up the habit from its original inhabitants and added slaked lime, which they used as pottery temper, giving rise to betel nut chewing as it is practised today.

=== The arrival of Austronesians ===
The speculated origin (shaded in green) and expansion (orange-coloured routes) of South Sulawesi language family in the peninsula

Their Austronesian ancestors settled on Sulawesi around 2500 B.C. There is "historical linguistic evidence of some late Holocene immigration of Austronesian speakers to South Sulawesi from Taiwan"—which means that the Bugis have "possible ultimate ancestry in South China", and that as a result of this immigration, "there was an infusion of an exogenous population from China or Taiwan." Migration from South China by some of the paternal ancestors of the Bugis is also supported by studies of Human Y-chromosome DNA haplogroups.

Christian Pelras, an anthropologist, hypothesized that the proto-Bugis may have arrived from abroad, possibly from Borneo, to the western seaboard of South Sulawesi. They were probably drawn to the mineral and natural resources in the hinterland. As the group began to spread towards the interior of the present-day Bugis heartland, they increasingly diverged from their neighbouring Makassarese, Mandarese and Torajan brethren; simultaneously, the proto-Bugis too would assimilate the former Austronesian tribes in the sparsely populated area, a process whereby the native populations would gradually adopt the language of the new arrivals. Hence, a new hybrid identity emerged through ethnogenesis, binding the original elements derived from the indigenous people together with the introduction of new techniques, items and ideas bought by the settlers, including weaving, metal arts and theological doctrine. The society, however, remains largely divided between two separate classes, the prevailing nobility and the common people.

=== Tana Ogi — Land of the Bugis ===
The homeland of the Bugis is the area around Lake Tempe and Lake Sidenreng in the Walannae Depression in the south-west peninsula of Sulawesi. It was here that the ancestors of the present-day Bugis settled, probably in the mid- to late second millennium B.C. The area is rich in fish and wildlife and the annual fluctuation of Lake Tempe (a reservoir lake for the Bila and Walannae rivers) allows speculative planting of wet rice, while the hills can be farmed by swidden or shifting cultivation, wet rice, hunting and gathering.

Around A.D. 1200, the availability of prestigious imported goods including Chinese and South-East Asian ceramics and Gujarati print-block textiles, coupled with newly discovered sources of iron ore in Luwu stimulated an agrarian revolution which expanded from the great lakes region into the lowland plains to the east, south and west of the Walennae depression. This led over the next four hundred years to the development of the major kingdoms of South Sulawesi, and the social transformation of chiefly societies into hierarchical proto-states.

== History ==
=== Early society ===
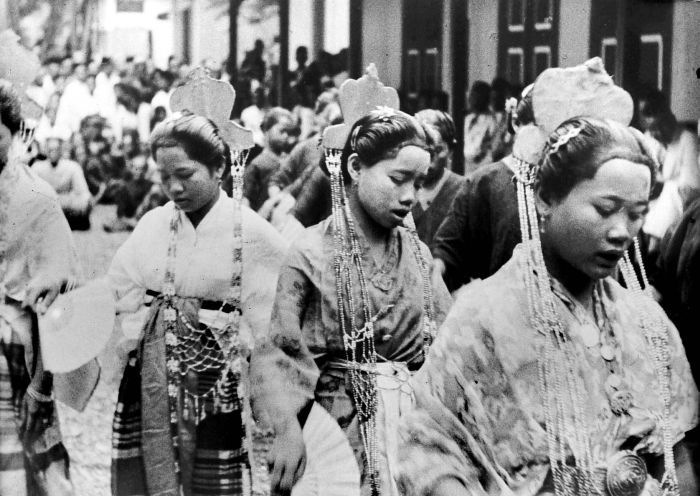
The court ladies of Bone, unknown date

The lifestyle of ancient Bugis people were, to some extent, preserved by the pagan Torajan people until the dawn of the 20th century. Their homes were mainly constructed on stilts and the communities were likely to be scattered along the river banks, sea or lake shores. The main undertakings during this period were farming rice, millet, adlay and other edible crops, catching fish and shellfish, obtaining forest produce and hunting wild animals. Buffaloes were imported and used for important occasions.

The earliest inhabitants may have used simple clothing. The women possibly wore a skirt and the men a loincloth and possibly a headcloth. Remains of bronze and gold ornaments have also been retrieved based on archeological evidence. Pottery is evident, although bamboo containers were more extensively used, along with bamboo knives. Weapons were sourced from iron and stones, while helmets and shields were made from rattan.

Theologically, the early Bugis potentially practiced ancestor worship. There were also ancient rituals related to agriculture and fertility. They generally buried their corpses, although there were several cases where the deceased body was disposed by immersion in the sea or lakes, or positioned in trees. Other mortuary practices includes cremation, especially for the rulers.

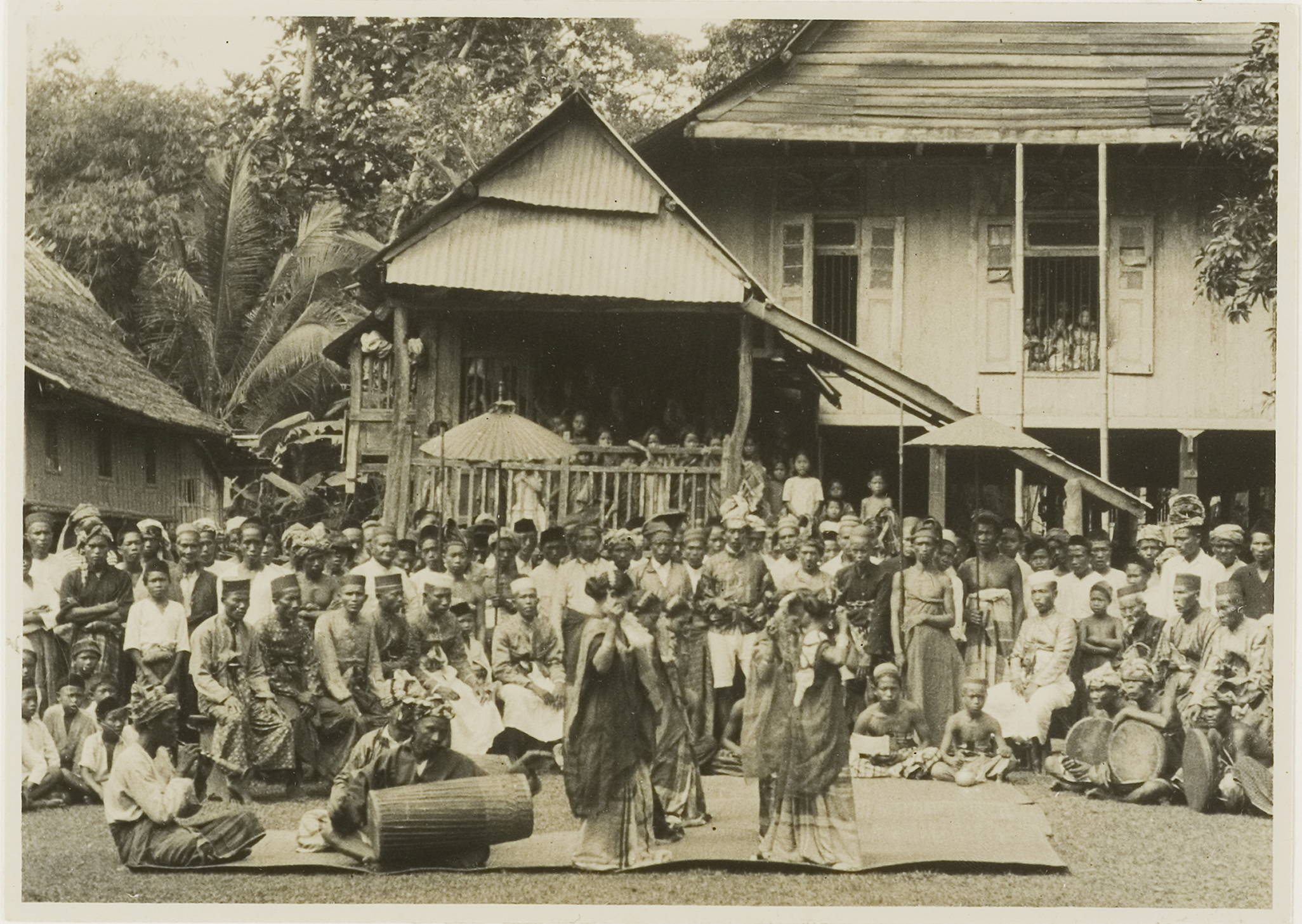
Traditional melodies and performing arts in South Sulawesi, 1930s

Despite having only sparsely populated communities, the Bugis did not live in complete isolation from the outside world. Trade and commerce were held high in regard in society. The archeological findings near Bantaeng and Ara unearthed ancient artifacts dating from 300 to 100 BC, denoting evidence that the southern part of Sulawesi has played an integral role in the axis of early insulindian trade. There are also traces of imported Chinese and other continental Southeast Asian ceramics and stoneware found in the pre-Islamic cemeteries.

However, in contrast to much of Southeast Asia, the indicators of Hindu and Buddhist materials are rather sparse in South Sulawesi cultures. Their writing system, and some of their names and words, along with few Buddhist bronze images found in Mandar and Bantaeng only suggest that the existence of trade relations made with the western archipelago and the presence of foreigners. It is likely that despite engaging in trade, the Bugis would resist external assimilation. Thus, outside elements are almost absent in the development of native religion and the indigenous states.

The intensity of the early trade led to a gradual shift in terms of the economic development, social construct, political interest and the balance of power amongst the South Sulawesi peoples, which has fundamentally led to the Bugis states, dynasties and polities began to flourish.

=== The growth of Bugis Kingdoms ===
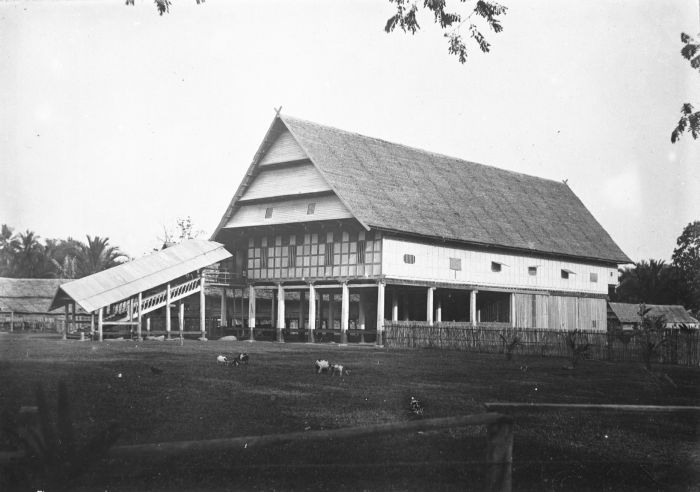
A palace owned by an aristocrat in the port city of Palopo, Luwu (c.1900–1930)

The progress of inter-insular commercial activities and the increasing interactions with Maritime Silk Road were potentially among the main factors contributing to the economic prosperity for a few leading South Sulawesi communities. The period between 1200 and 1600 witnessed a radical change throughout the political landscape of lowland South Sulawesi Peninsula.

The trade in South Sulawesi was based on the export of rare commodities, a business which was easily dominated by an exclusive ruling class. The administrative structure is fairly basic, a majority of the states are small and in a form of a local chiefdom. A small population is sufficient to assist the elite with food, physical work and military assistance to preserve their state's independence.

However, by the 15th century, a major economic revolution taken place, and agricultural become an important economic foundation. To continue their powers in the agrarian-based society, the ruling elites are now required to handle the near unprecedented growth on the rice-producing territories to accommodate a major population boom. Hence, in order adapt with the economic and societal change, a new system and intermediaries are needed.

Trade and commerce however, still retains its essential importance for the South Sulawesi economy. Rice become a major source of export; and at the same time, the economy is stimulated by the import of prestige goods from other parts of archipelago. The area potentially experienced exceptional growth following the rise of Malacca as a regional entrepôt. Conversely, the wealth for the elite families in South Sulawesi would also consequently rose due to this intensive commercial transactions, despite the fact that trade is now not solely regarded as their single source of riches.

=== Emergence of new political strengths over the peninsula ===
The southwest arm of Celebes in the 16th century. Parts of Kingdom of Luwu (Red), Mandar & Torajan Society (light yellow), Ajatappareng Confederation (Yellow), Tellumpocco'e Confederation (Striped), Gowa and Tallo (Orange)

In the 1500s, Luwu was the major political force in the Bugis heartland, with its authority proclaimed throughout a large section of the peninsula. Nevertheless, new geopolitical players that would resist its dominance were already beginning to take shape by the end of the century.

The impact following the rise of Malacca were more visible in the western coast of South Sulawesi, an area with a high concentration of Malay and Minangkabau merchants arriving from the west. It slowly gained the attention of the kingdoms of Soppeng and Sindereng, with the pursuit to include the area in their territorial expansions, these Bugis states have already lost their direct sea access in the west coast by Luwu.

Sidenreng, a tributary under the domain of Soppeng had slowly grown into prominence and slowly seemed to be resistant to accept Luwu's dominance in the area. In cooperation with a few Bugis kingdoms in the western coast — Sawitto', Alitta, Suppa' and Bacukiki'; as well as Rappang in the interior, they formed a loose confederation known as Aja'tappareng ('the lands west of the lake').

Conversely, the neighbouring Bugis territory of Wajo also possessed an aspiration for an autonomy against Luwu, and it too started to extend their influence and dominance in the surrounding areas. By 1490, they entered an agreement with Luwu, and in the agreement they would no longer be considered as "its servant" but as a "Luwu's child". By 1498, the Wajorse enthroned Arung Matoa Puang ri Ma'galatung as their ruler, he would later turn the domain as one of the major Bugis Kingdom.

The lower western seaboard, the Bugis Kingdom of Bone under the rule of King Kerrampelua' (c.1433–83) had also enacted an expansion plan to absorb parts of neighboring Luwu territories into its vassalage. Thus, by two centuries later, it has become an area for intense confrontation between the two kingdoms.

While the Makassarese, traditionally occupied the deep down in the south and the western coast of the peninsula were mainly concentrated their political rule in Siang and Bantaeng (the latter was potentially still under Luwu's nominal control). However, the small twin states of Gowa and Tallo (better known by foreigners as a single state of Makassar) were started to gain its importance during this period.

=== Bugis-Makassar society in the 16th century ===
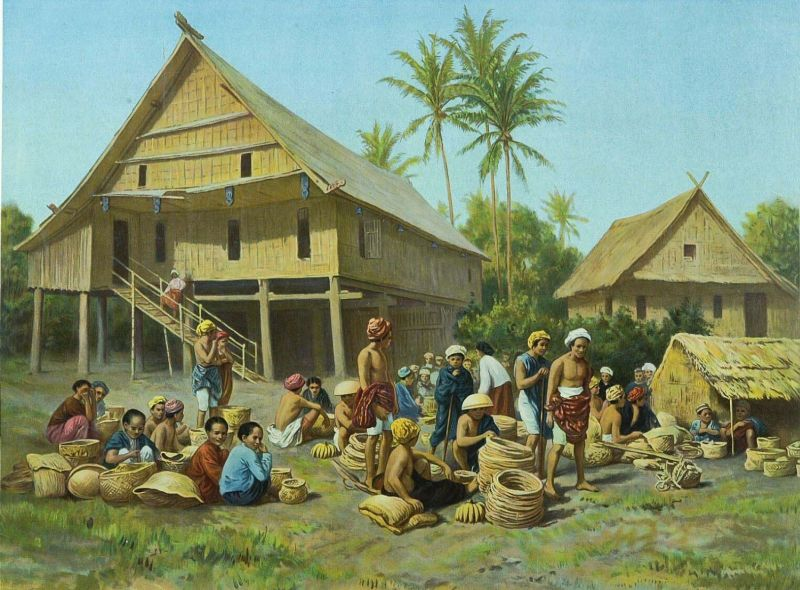
A folk market, South Sulawesi, c.19th century

By the 16th century, the Bugis life was marked by a burgeoning tolerance towards foreign influences. Overseas products were no longer limited to the ruling class, but were available to the commoners as well. The method of home construction remained the same. Sketches from a few western sources in the first half of the 17th century illustrate tall and strong wooden homes raised on piles.

Nonetheless, inside the more wealthy homes, some foreign furnitures, namely tables and chairs began to emerge, and basic wall openings sometimes became real windows with shutters. The Bugis names for these objects signaled their Portuguese connection, Jandela (window) deriving from Janela, Kadera (chairs) from Cadeira; and Mejang (table) from Mesa. A gradual change is also noted in the household tools and utensils, including glasses and Iberian-style jugs and trays. There were also the adoption of a few Portuguese games, notably dice, card games, and marbles. The Portuguese and Spaniards also introduced new food and produce in the local diet, mainly from the New World crops: sweet potato and tobacco, and also other important items – manioc, maize and chilies.

During the period, the women dressed in baggy pants; the usage of short tunics and sleeves were also noted by the free married women. For the affluent male, there was potentially also a favour towards western shirts and hats, sometimes paired together with a plume, and a jacket. The slave class and the male commoners however, would usually go topless.

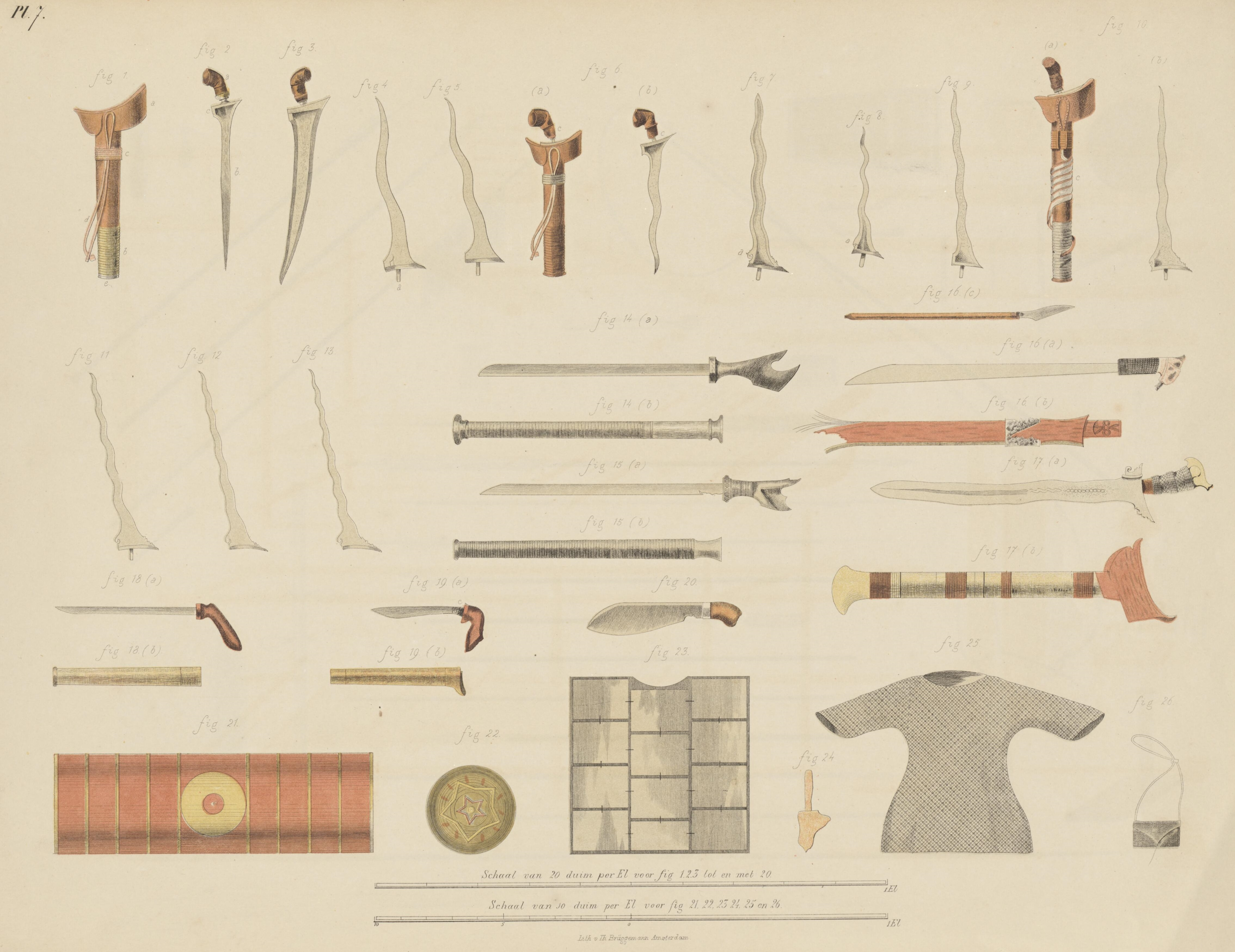
A catalogue of various Bugis weapons, armors, and equipments, 1874

The aftershocks following the Fall of Malacca were potentially being strongly felt in South Sulawesi. As noted from Tomé Pires in Suma Oriental, few traders from 'The Macassar Islands', including the Bugis and Bajo were amongst the people who arrived in Melaka to trade, although they were small in numbers. Conversely, the Muslim-Malay traders from Patani, Pahang, and Ujung Tanah in the Malay Peninsula; as well as from Champa in Indochina; and Minangkabau in Sumatra settled throughout the port cities in the western coast, including Suppa', Pancana-Tanete, Siang, Tallo, Sanrabone and Gowa. Due to this extensive bilateral connection, the people of South Sulawesi were generally well aware on the political-religious changes taken place in the western half of the archipelago.

It can be inferred that following the Conquest of Malacca by the Portuguese Conquistadors, the trading links intensified between South Sulawesi to other commercial powerhouse: namely Johor and Patani in the peninsula, Acheh in Sumatra, Banjarmasin in Borneo and Demak in Java – all having the status as a bastion for Islamic faith. However, as late as the mid 16th century, South Sulawesi continued to be one of the few remaining significant domains in the regional native trading network where Islam had yet to take hold.

=== Early attempts to Christianize the Bugis states ===
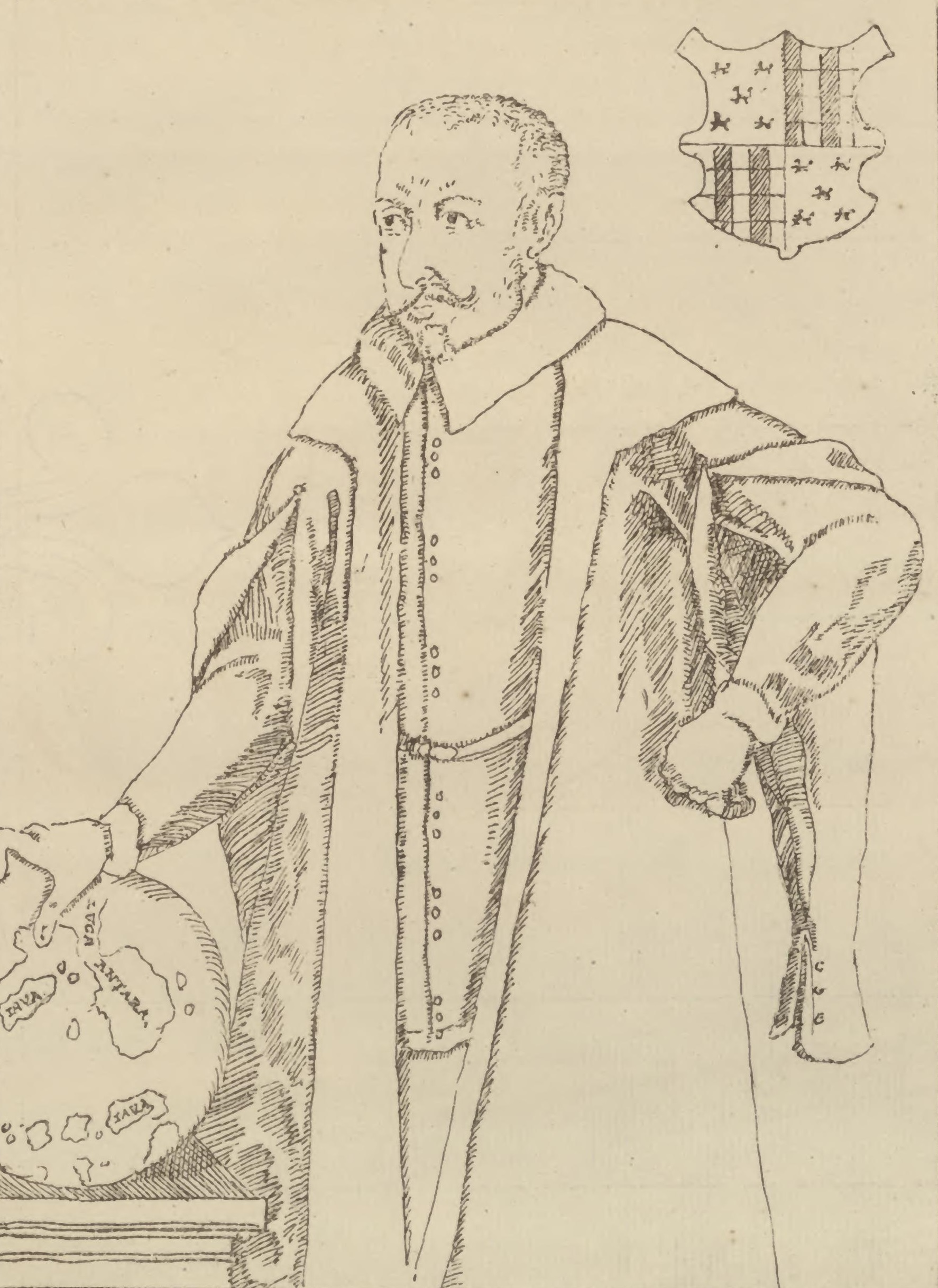
Manuel Godinho de Erédia, a Portuguese Malaccan explorer of Bugis-Portuguese descent

While early contacts with Islam had been made since 1490 with the trading relationship between Siang and Malacca, most Bugis still adhered to the native patturioloang religion. In year 1540, two aristocrats from Makassar were baptized in Ternate. They later embarked on another visit the following year and bought many of the region's previous materials, including gold, sandalwood and iron weapons. Antonio de Paiva, a Portuguese trader, made multiple voyages between Sulawesi and Malacca from 1542, potentially intrigued by the potential riches of the region. During his expedition to the Bugis states of Suppa' and Siang, he was involved in a theological discussion and was requested to baptize La Putebulu, Datu of Suppa' and his family, followed by king of Siang in 1544. The baptism was also concluded with a military alliance with both states.

De Paiva's return to Malacca was not only together with official gifts to the Kingdom of Portugal, but also accompanied with four young Bugis men who would later attend the Jesuit college in Indian Goa. The two Bugis Kings also requested priests and a possible military support from the Portuguese Malaccan governor, potentially to curb the increasing peril imposed by the neighboring Makassarese states of Gowa-Tallo. Further baptism continued in 1545 by a priest, Father Vicente Viegas, which was involved the Christianization of Bugis rulers in Alitta and Bacukiki', according to Manuel Godinho de Erédia, kings of Sawitto and Sidenreng also participated, all were allies of Suppa' part of Ajatappareng alliance.

Relations with Portuguese were still good, until an elopement between a Portuguese officer and daughter of La Putebulu from Suppa was exposed as they married secretly in Malacca, which would result in the birth of Manuel Godinho de Erédia. The Portuguese vessel had to rapidly leave Sulawesi to avoid violence and they did not dared to travel back to the island until 1559. One member of the voyage, Manuel Pinto, decided to remain in South Sulawesi, he recorded the political development and involved in discussions with several Bugis-Makassar rulers in the region before returning to Malacca (via Java). However Datu of Suppa and its population alongside other Ajatappareng states remain largely Christians according to Manuel Godinho de Erédia.

Following the restoration of economic relations with the Portuguese Malacca in 1559, there were repeated requests made from South Sulawesi primarily Ajatappareng states for priests, however not many were available and the Portuguese did not consider Bugis as their prime concern. Not until 1584 did the Portuguese send four Franciscans fathers to the area, and their stay was a short one. Also not known were the fates of the four Bugis men sent for education in Indian Goa. Subsequently, no new attempts to baptized Sulawesi were taken after the period, nor Portuguese military support against invasion by King of Gowa-Tallo, Karaeng Lakiyung Tunipalangga, which annexed and vassalized Siang alongside other Ajatappareng states.

=== Quest for prestige, influence and powers over the peninsula ===
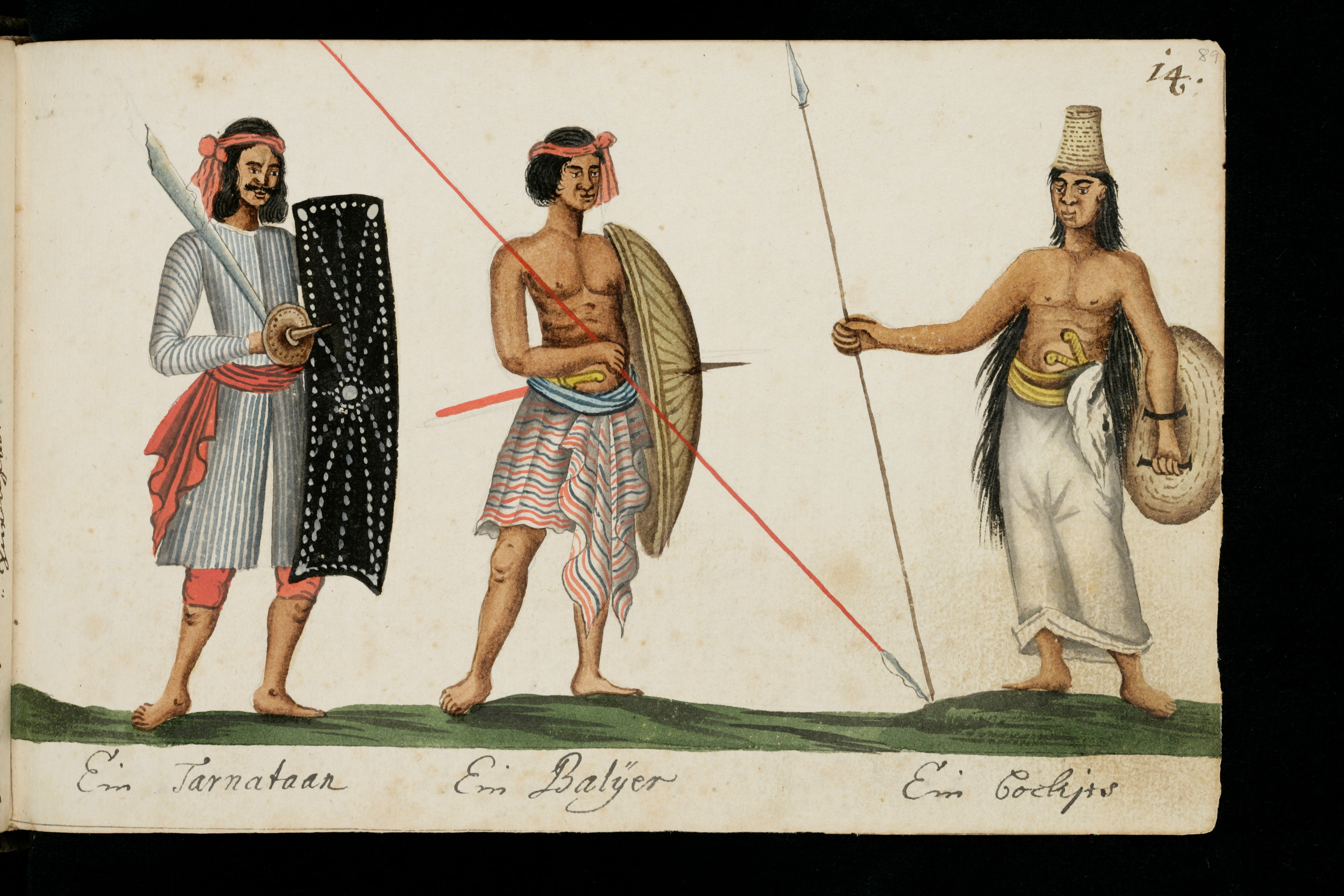
From left to right: Ternate, Bali and Bugis soldiers, European illustration from the 17th century

During the resumption of Portuguese-South Sulawesi relations in 1559, the political dynamic of the region have effectively morphed. The Makassarese state of Gowa had exerted his influence towards the north, and absorbed many Bugis states that have had a friendly relations towards the Portuguese.

Simultaneously, the Kingdom of Bone also commenced its southward expansion, and soon come into a direct contact with the Makassarese. Both kingdoms are pursuing dominance in the entirety of the Peninsula together with the important trade routes.

Thus, the two growing kingdoms are bound for a major collision course and a war finally broke out in 1562. Gowa was assisted by Luwu; and also by Wajo and Soppeng, the latter two would probably preferred in favour of a distant sovereign like Luwu or Gowa, as they would furnish Wajo and Soppeng with a greater autonomy in contrast to a nearby kingdom like Bone, which would likely dominate them.

The war concluded in 1565 and a peace negotiation followed afterwards. The two states agreed in the Tengka River as their respective spheres of influence under the Treaty of Caleppa. The citizens of Bone and Gowa were also awarded equal rights in each other's jurisdiction.

The ambitions for dominance continued in South Sulawesi. Between 1570 and 1591, several military operations were conducted by Gowa, in which oftentimes with the support of Luwu. Although a distant power, Gowa tend to be rather hard towards its Bugis vassals of Wajo and Soppeng, this made these two states become inclined to the invitation by Bone to restore their autonomy. In 1590, the three kingdoms (Wajo, Soppeng and Bone) entered an alliance known as Tellumpocco'e, 'the Three Summits' or 'the Big Three'.

In 1590, Daeng Mammeta embarked on another campaign to annihilate Wajo, but he was killed during an amok. A truce was followed soon after in 1591, the peace negotiation, under the Treaty of Caleppa was thus renewed.

=== The Islamisation of Bugis-Makassar-Mandar ===
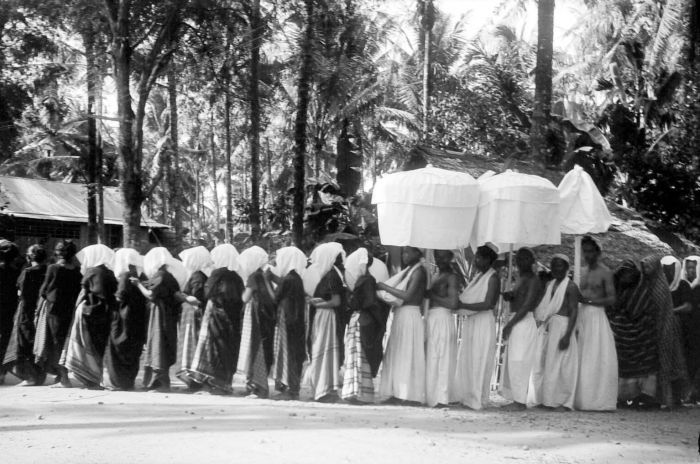
Funeral ceremony for the ruler of Sawitto, 1930s

In the later half of the 16th century, the contest between Islam and Christianity was still largely undecided in South Sulawesi Peninsula. Most of the surrounding kingdoms in Sulawesi had already become Muslim under the sway of Ternate-Gorontalo in 1525 and Buton in 1542. There were already individual converts in South Sulawesi.

In 1550, the Malay-Muslim community of Macassar were awarded special privileges by the ruler of Gowa according to Lontarak Patturiolonga. However, in 1575, during the visit by Abdul Makmur (Dato' ri Bandang), one of the Minangkabau proselytizers of Islam, he noted that there are several difficulties to convert the locals — their fondness for dried boar flesh, raw deer liver diced with blood (lawa) and palm liquor. He then embarked to promulgate the teaching of Islam in the Kingdom of Kutei, eastern Borneo, where he was more successful. In 1580, the Sultan of Ternate, Babullah, advised the ruler of Gowa to embrace the teaching of Islam, but the king declined. However, as a gesture of kindness, he allowed the Makassar-Malay community to construct a mosque.

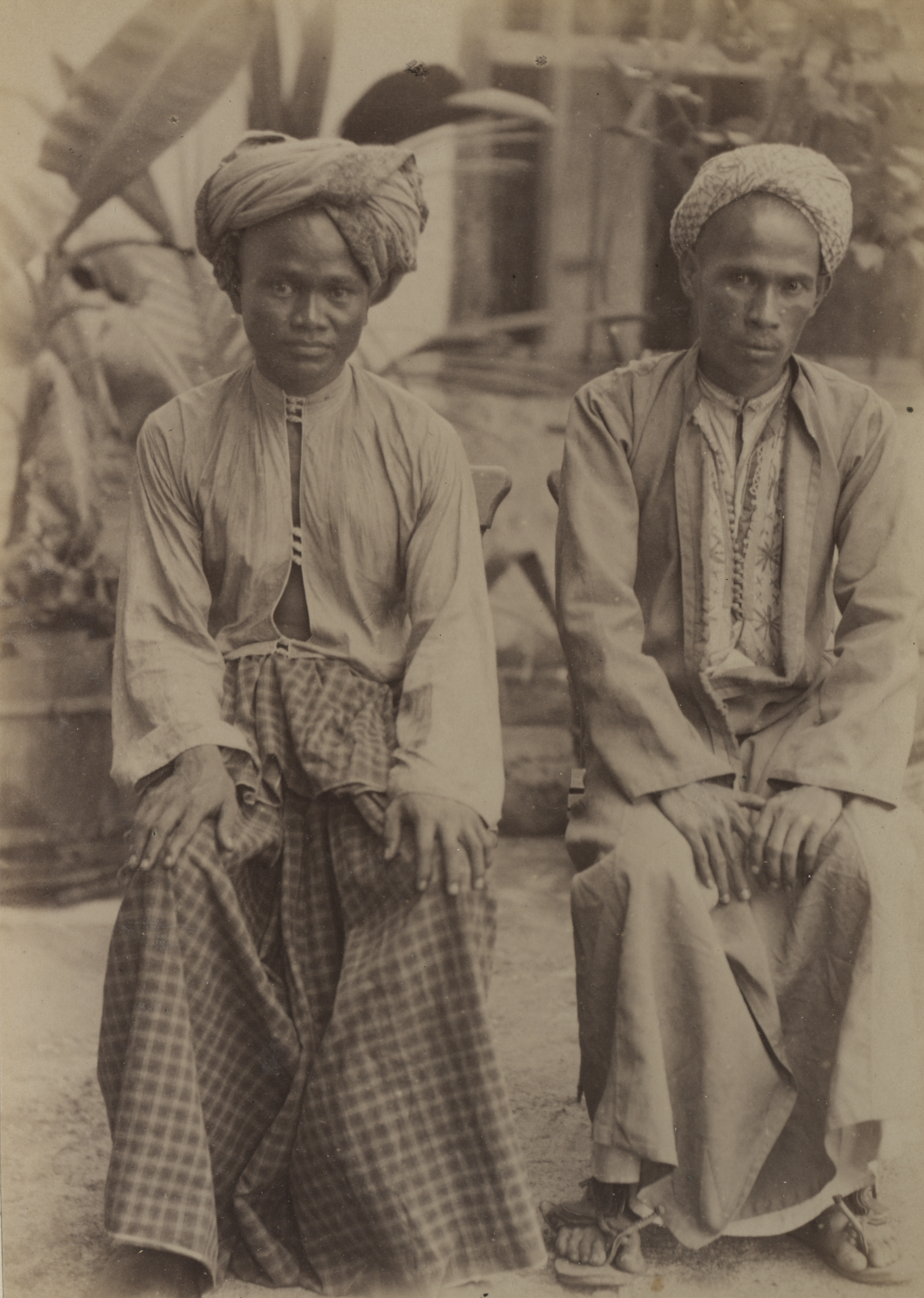
Bugis pilgrims to Mecca, 19th century

Abdul Makmur returned to Makassar with Sulaiman (Dato' ri Pa'timang) and Abdul Jawad (Dato' ri Tiro). All three of them are from Minangkabau and likely to have been educated in Aceh, before they visited Johor-Riau to study South Sulawesi culture from Bugis-Makassar sailors, followed by study under Wali Songo of Java, in a proselytization mission facilitated by Sultan of Johor. After their new attempts to introduce the Islamic teaching once more met with opposition, they left for Luwu. This was because Luwu was the spiritual center of South Sulawesi and its indigenous belief of Dewata SewwaE had some similarities with Islam. They successfully converted the Pattiarase, Datu of Luwu and in February 1605 he took the name of Sultan Muhammad. The group then revisited Makassar and the three of them later managed promoted Islam to the Gowan ruler, to become Muslim under the name of Sultan Ala'uddin. In November 1607, the first public prayers were promulgated in the newly constructed Tallo' Mosque. Conversion began slowly and adapted with native Ammatoa practitioners centered in Bulukumba.

The twin kingdom of Gowa and Tallo persuaded other South Sulawesi Kingdoms to emulate their move on adopting Islam as their religion. When this invitation was declined, they launched a series of military actions known as "the Islamic wars". In 1608, the west coast states of Bacukiki', Suppa', Sa wino' and Mandar; and in the east coast, Akkotengeng and Sakkoli' submitted; followed by subjugation of Sidenreng and Soppeng in 1609, Wajo in 1610.

Pursuant to the submission from the Bugis state of Bone in 1611, most of the South Sulawesi Peninsula (with the exception of Toraja highlands) have accepted Islam. Bone, subsequently would continue to Islamize its two vassal states located in the edge of the Torajan realm, namely Enrekang and Duri.

The Islamisation in most of South Sulawesi have provided a platform for a faith and ideological revolution. Islamic laws and principles were observed and absorbed into the Makassar, Bugis and Mandar cultures.

Dato' ri Bandang directed first towards the foundation of Sharia principles on the land, having emphasis on the importance of religious service at the circumcision ceremony, marriage and funerals. However, with the exception of funeral rites which were absolutely Islamized; other rites of passage based on the Islamic understanding were simply incorporated with the existing traditional practices, norms and customs. As for prohibition, there are also strong enforcement against adultery and the consumption of pork; other behaviors including consuming alcohol and opium, offerings to sacred places, worshipping at regalia, lending money with interest (Riba) and gambling were also condemned.

As Islamization was slowly taking root among the society in the peninsula, mosques were built in each of the states and domains. Thus, appointments were made for the newly established positions of qadi, imam and khatib throughout the Bugis-Makassar lands.

Despite being devout Muslims, the process did not serve as a hindrance towards the Makassarese Muslim King of Gowa to maintain a friendly relationship with Portuguese and Christianity. Despite so, the Bugis and Makassarese realms became Muslim and were now prevented to convert to Christianity by the local ruler.

=== The twilight of dominance ===
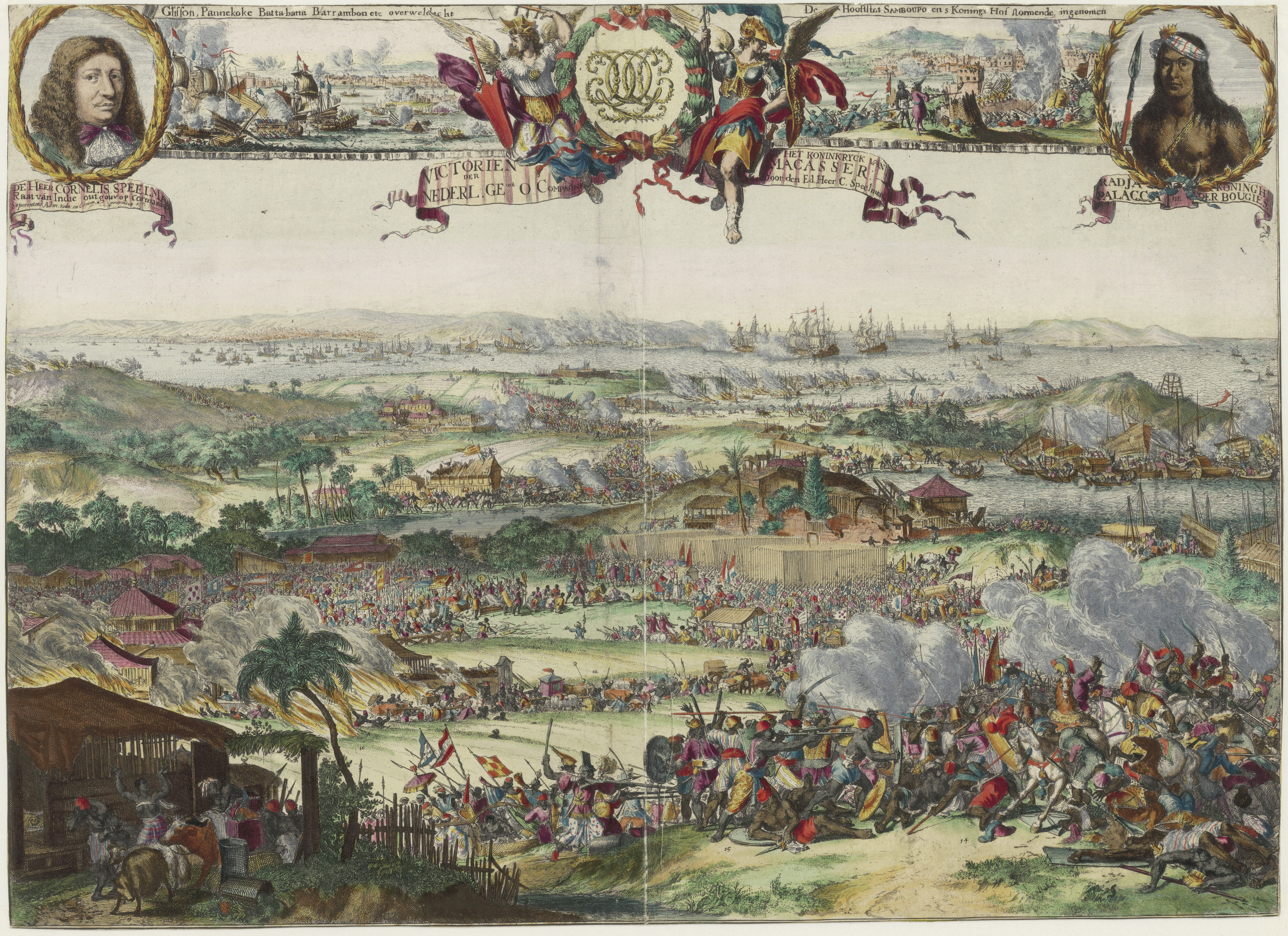
The Conquest of Makassar, one of the most climatic events in the history of South Sulawesi

Beginning from the end of the 17th century and the dawn of the 19th, the highly delicate balance of power in South Sulawesi was completely plunged on a downward spiral due to a series of radical changes in the local statecraft, including internal dynastic disputes, geopolitical tensions, growing secondary influence from the western consumerism and the Fall of Makassar.

After over a century following the monumental struggle between Gowa and Bone for the conquest of the peninsula, another war was slowly being reignited between the two rivaling powers. The conflict traced its origin from a domestic affair in the Kingdom of Bone, who was ruled from 1631 to 1634 by La Ma'daremmeng. The king enforced rules based on the strong Islamic principles, including removing the pagan bissu and forbidding the consumption of palm beer and other superstitious practice. The final straw was the prohibition of slavery, which resulted the rebellion by the mother of the king. She later then sought the assistance of Gowa and a major military operation ensured. The Makassarese forces managed to achieve success and captured 30,000 Bugis prisoners, including La'daremmeng and installed a Makassarese governor. After a subsequent revolt, Bone was transformed into a full-fledged colony. This resulted the anger amongst the Bone people and its nobility.

At the same time, the Dutch was also eyeing their attention towards the port city of Makassar, an important capital of commerce, wealth, political and military base in the eastern archipelago. Conversely, both Makassarese Kingdom of Gowa and the Dutch perceived each other as an imminent threat against their dominance within the highly lucrative spice trade.

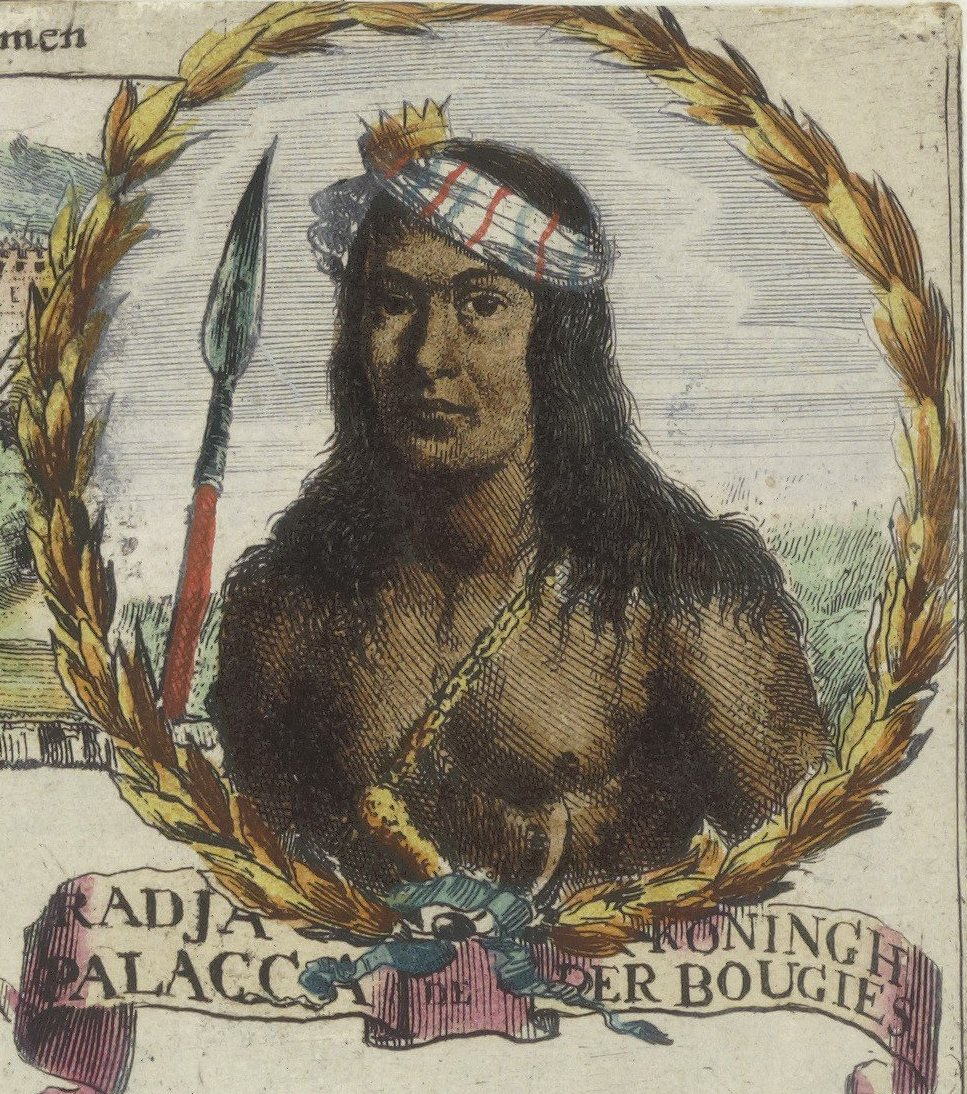
Arung Palakka, an illustration from the 17th century

The opportunity for Bone came after the victorious Dutch attack on Makassar in 1660. Required to sign an unfavorable truce, the Gowans requested 10,000 Bone people for a forced ditch digging as defense against potential attacks from the land. Few Bone noblemen, including Arung Pallaka, took refuge in the neighbouring Buton and presented for a Bugis-Dutch alliance against Makassar. The military alliance was also joined by Soppeng state, which, akin to Bone, aimed the attacks as an act of retribution against the action of Gowa for enslaving thousands of their people to construct the facilities in Makassar.

The war erupted in 1666, with the Bugis-Dutch alliance being assisted with troops from Ternate, Ambon and Buton. The main Makassarese ally during the war was the northern Bugis state of Wajo. Despite being an associate of Bone by treaty in the past, the Wajorese leader decided to enter an alliance with Gowa to combat against the Dutch influence.

The fall of Makassar was proven to be fatal. Sultan Hasanuddin of Gowa was obliged to sign the Treaty of Bongaya on 18 November 1667. This required the Makassarese to removed most of its fortification, relinquish its trade in spices, end its import of foreign goods with the exception of the Dutch East India Company, banish the Portuguese and other non-Dutch Europeans, and reject any other attempts of suzerainty, in both Bugis lands or other parts of the archipelago. In 1669, Sultan Hasanuddin abdicated from the throne.

The Dutch have succeeded to achieve its goal after the fall of Makassar, but they are not the sole victor; another was the Bugis State of Bone, despite having a few restriction following the treaty that it also signed, the kingdom would effectively maintain its sovereignty until the 19th century. Hence, in the Bone narration, Arung Palakka holds the status as an independence warrior; while in Makassar heritage, the rivaling Sultan Hasanuddin is hailed as the hero for the Makassarese.

Once liberated from Makassar, the power vacuum has possibly set the stage for Bone to hold an unchallenged sovereignty across the whole peninsula. However, the prospect of unifying all the Bugis lands under a sole ruler was stopped by the existence of the Dutch in the region. The peninsula then continued to persist under a mosaic of various small and large confederations.

=== A new golden age ===
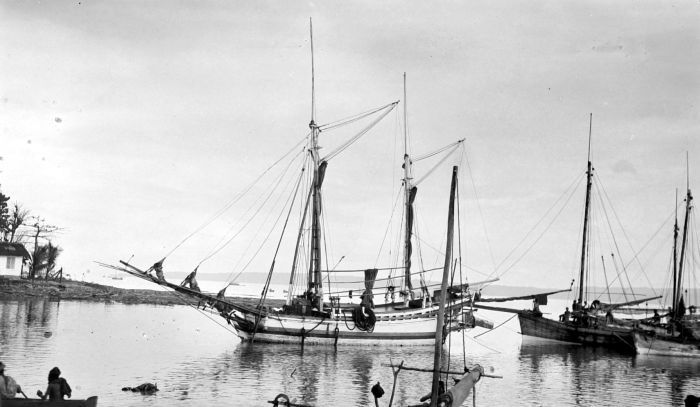
A Bugis vessel in West Sulawesi during the early 20th century

One of the major ripple effect following the conquest of Makassar was the change in the design of navigation and emigration routes among the South Sulawesi people. The cosmopolitan harbour of Makassar become a crucial maritime starting point for not only for the Makassarese, but also for the Bugis who seek for wealth and fame in the western Archipelago, as the Dutch set a heavy restriction for their access on the eastern spice islands.

Concurrently, during the later 17th and 18th centuries, a transformative period emerged, marked by the establishment of a crucial sea-trading network. Ambitious migrants engaged in bold overseas ventures, contributing to the gradual rise of a merchant middle class that would later hold a prominent position in Bugis society. The construction of this pivotal sea-trading network left a lasting impact, shaping economic activities and fostering connectivity both within their native South Sulawesi and in foreign regions. Nevertheless, during this timeframe, they also underwent a flourishing art and cultural renaissance in their homeland. Many of their important literary works, including the majority of their post-La Galigo productions, originated from these years.

The Age of Sail also marked with other closely interconnected waves of mass migration and trade towards Riau Archipelago, Malay Peninsula, Singapore, Sumatra, Batavia, northern coast of Java, Bali, Madura, Alor, the Lesser Sunda Islands, coastal Borneo, Sulu Archipelago and other parts of Sulawesi in search of riches, prestige and political influence.

During the same period, they ushered a new golden era. With the consolidation of Islamic faith and values on one side, and the recognition as one of the major maritime society on the other; the two redefining elements that would be infused to become part and parcel with the Bugis identity until the early 20th century.

== Culture ==
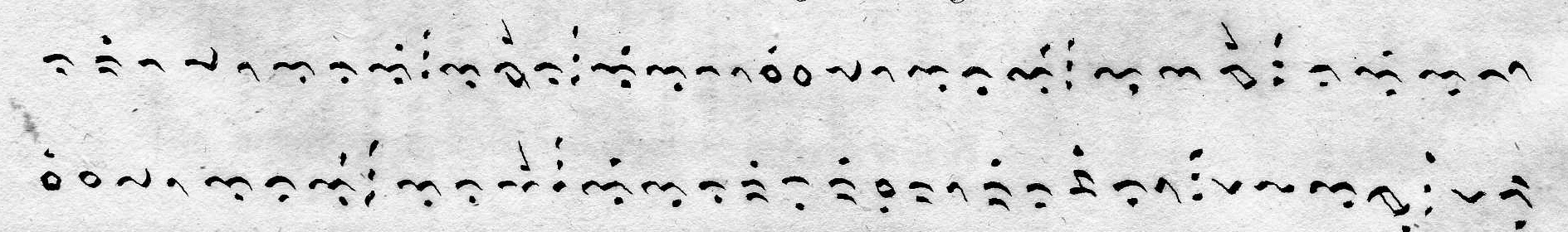
Lontara, the traditional Bugis-Makassar writing script

=== Language and dialects ===
Areas with high concentrations Bugis-speakers in Sulawesi; with its central core located in the lowland plains of South Sulawesi province

The Bugis language constitutes a part of the larger Austronesian family. It is among the major languages located in the southwest hemisphere of Sulawesi, the others being Makassar, Toraja, Massenrempulu and Mandar. These languages collectively belong to the South Sulawesi languages.

Bugis speakers are dominant in most of the districts in South Sulawesi; namely Bone, Soppeng, Wajo, Sidrap, Pinrang, Barru, Sinjai, and Parepare. In Bulukumba, Pangkep, and Maros, the populations are checkerboarded between Bugis and Makassar-speaking villages, each villages having their own separate language identity intact. A similarly unsharp language border can also be observed in the northwestern coastal towns of Pinrang (in South Sulawesi Province) and Polmas (in West Sulawesi), being a transitional area between the traditional Bugis and Mandarese cultural areas.

Located in the periphery of the Bugis-Torajan world, the Massenrempulu people (constituting Duri, Enrekang, Maiwa and Malimpung groups) from Enrekang and northern Pinrang as well as the Tae' speakers of Luwu are also occasionally identified and embraced as among the subgroups of the Bugis family due to the shared tradition and common religious affiliation. Culturally, they formed a continuum between the Bugis and Toraja people; linguistically, the Massenrempulu's and Tae's mother tongue generally inherited a closer linguistic intelligibility with the Torajan language.

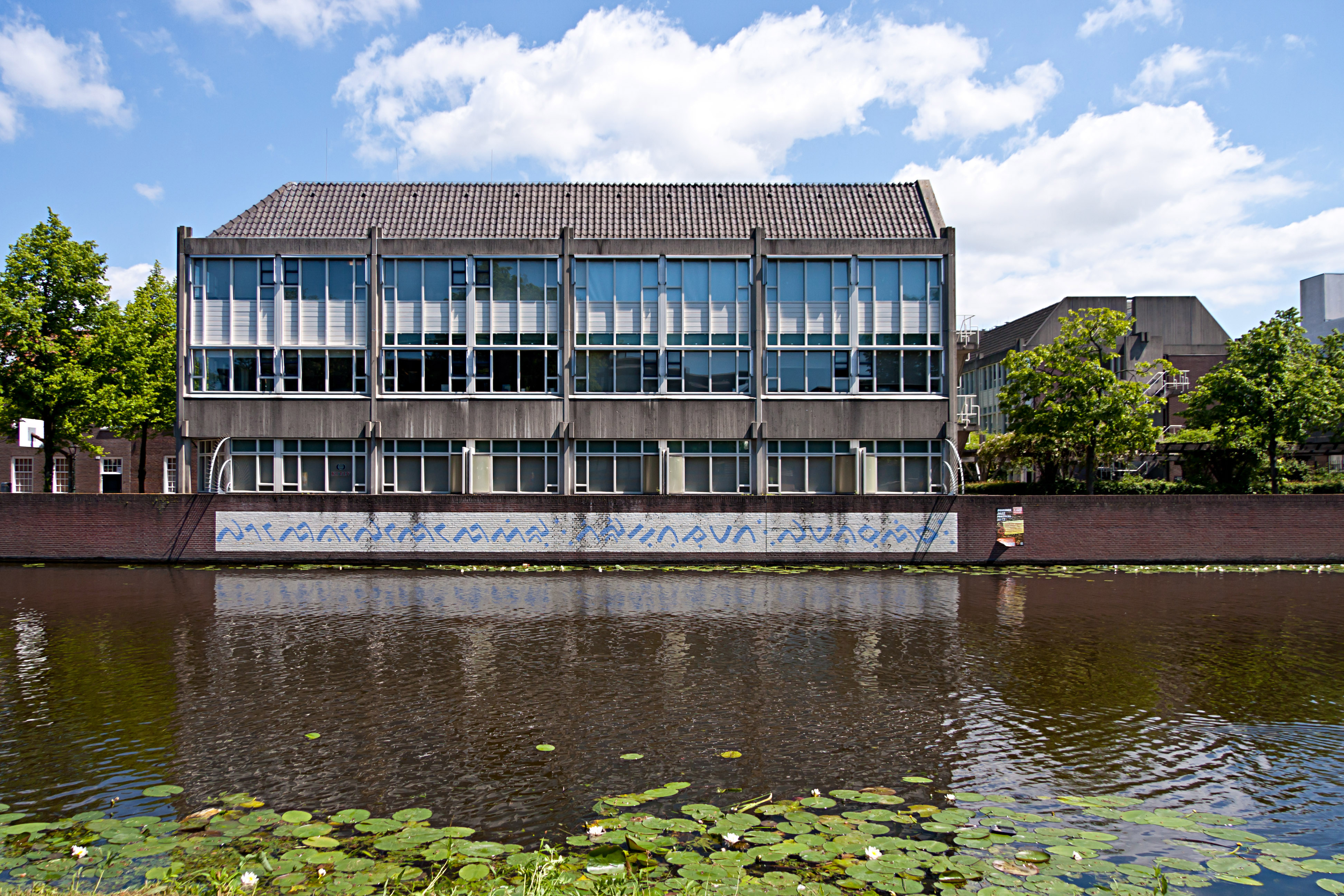
A Bugis poem with its font shaded in blue and a white background, located in the canal banks of Royal Netherlands Institute of Southeast Asian and Caribbean Studies, Leiden, Netherlands

Despite having some divergence in the local expression and dialects, the Bugis variants (with the exception of Massenrempulu and Tae', when considered) commonly retain a high level of mutual intelligibility between one another. Nonetheless, it is an accepted practice amongst the mainstream Bugis society to distinguish themselves regionally and culturally based on the location of their traditional and ancestral states.

There are a subtle differences on the language spoken in these areas and linguist identified these versions as separate dialects (rather than distinct languages). Presently, there are ten main branches of Bugis Dialects — Bone, Camba, Pangkep, Sidrap, Pasangkayu, Sinjai, Soppeng, Wajo, Barru and Luwu, as well as dozens of smaller subdialects deriving from the main branches. However, some researchers are divided whether Sawitto — a divergent Bugis variety spoken in central Pinrang — remains under the same language group or being diverged enough to be considered as a separate language.

Bugis Wikipedia (Wikipedia basa Ugi) is the Bugis-language edition of Wikipedia, the free online encyclopedia

The present-day Bugis people are mostly bilingual. In South Sulawesi, they use two leading languages, either Bugis or Indonesian, tailored based on the environment, social circle and activities. Bahasa Indonesia is largely incepted on official situations, it is the language of formal education, administration, mass media and modern literature; Bahasa Indonesia is also prevalent during conversation with non-Bugis speakers. In the informal and casual settings around the Bugis-speaking circle, a code-switch would be a commonplace, or intertwined with elements of both languages in varying degrees, such as speaking Bahasa Indonesia with a strong Bugis-influenced elements and vice versa.

In the South Sulawesi province, the affixes such as -ki', -ko, na-, -ji, - mi, etc. are emulated and conceived in the Indonesian-Bugis-Makassar hybrid. The Bugis-Makassar accent, known as Okkots is also observed for the usage of a stronger -ng pronunciation in parts its speech. The fixture is not exclusively confined in the borders of South Sulawesi, the pattern can also be heard in other parts of Indonesia with a visible Bugis population. Outside the province, the language hybrid is not solely influenced by Bahasa Indonesia, but alongside traces of other local languages and dialects amalgamated with the diaspora Bugis language. Similarly beyond Indonesia, the extension of the language blend can also be seen in parts of Malaysia and Singapore, home to a sizable Bugis community. Instead of having influenced with Bahasa Indonesia, the Bugis communities in these countries would also be influenced by the Malay language and its local dialects.

Outside from their ancestral heartland in the lowland plains of South Sulawesi, the Bugis language, dialects and hybrids are found throughout their extensive network of diaspora and ethnic enclaves in Sulawesi and all across Insular Southeast Asia. However, presently there tends to be a pronounced language shift among the diaspora outside of South Sulawesi, hence the understanding and the command on the Bugis language may vary based on the personal background, exposure, interest and contacts with their ancestral language.

=== Philosophy ===
Siri' na Pacce (Shame, Compassion)

— Bugis-Makassar-Mandar-Toraja code of ethic

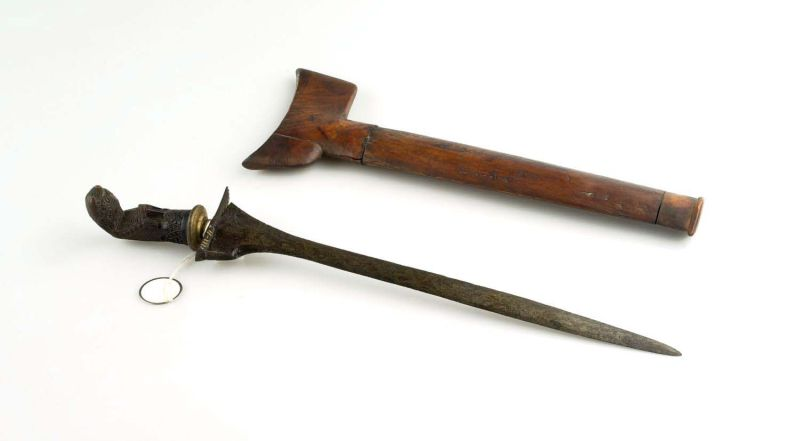
One of the Bugis-styled dagger

The Bugis-Makassar possess a rich heritage, philosophy, religious and social structure. Their customs are based on the concept Pangadereng, originally consisting of Ade' (custom), Rapang (Jurisprudence), Bicara (Judiciary) and Warik (Social system); following the Islamisation of the Bugis-Makassar, Syara' (Syariah) was incorporated into its core values.

Another fundamental local wisdom includes Siri' na pacce. It provides guidance, for social convention and moral conduct. Siri signifies the consolidation of a demeanor of shame and self-esteem; it acted as a pillar that bears the importance of dignity, virtue, esteem, solidarity and responsibility. Siri is essential for someone to be regarded as a tau (human). Pacce manifests as a presence of compassion and solidarity. It involves a person's ability on emotional intelligence, which includes love, sadness, pain, and solidarity. Another interpretation of Pecce emphasizes self-sacrifice, hard work, and abstinence. In addition to the Bugis and Makassarese, the traditional ethos is also shared by their northern cousins, the Torajans and Mandarese.

Translated as the "four corners", Sulappa Eppa represents the ancient philosophy, ideas and theories of the Bugis-Makassar on the notion that the universe was built in a form of a giant rhombus, created by four salient fundamentals – wind, fire, water and earth. Thus, the classical Bugis-Makassar aesthetic articulations and nuances are largely created and envisioned in a dominant four-cornered composure; including on their traditional writing scripts (the lontara), architectural layouts, ceremonial cuisines (songko and songkolo), artistic designs, textile (sarong motives) and philosophical values. The four elements are also synonymously evoked by a sense of four distinct colors – wind (yellow), fire (red), water (white) and earth (black). Additionally, the Lipa' Sabbe or sarung sutra (a sarung-cloth made from silk) signifies as an embodiment to honor the refined Bugis-Makassar cultural paradigm in its purest form.

=== Traditional script ===
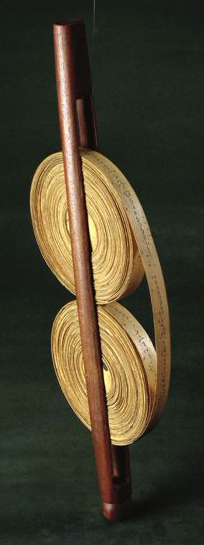
The early forms of recorded Bugis literature was primarily documented in a Lontar leave scroll, as can be seen in the Sure' Bawang

The Lontara traced its origin from the Kawi script; however, it has received a localized development and modification to accommodate the writings in the Bugis, Makassar and Mandar language. It was traditionally used for formal and official documents such as contracts, trade laws, treaties, maps, and journals, both in Western book format and in the traditional palm-leaf manuscript. Following the rise of South Sulawesi as a naval powerhouse in eastern archipelago, the script expanded its influence, being introduced and incorporated as the Lonta Ende in Flores, Mbojo in eastern Sumbawa and Satera Jontal in western Sumbawa, albeit with alternations for the latter languages.

Its designation, "Lontara" was acquired from the term Lontar, the Javanese and Malay name from Palmyra Palm, whose leaves were commonly utilized for writing the manuscripts. It is also sometimes characterized as the Bugis script, as many of the historical writings are widely found in this language. In the Bugis Language, the writing system is styled as "urupu sulapa eppa", being described as "square" or "four-cornered letters", which served as a vivid illustration of the early Bugis-Makassar interpretation on the four ingredients that molded the universe — fire, water, earth and air.

During the Dutch colonization of East Indies, the writing system is largely being superseded with the introduction of Latin Alphabet. Nonetheless, the script still retains its intimate cultural importance amongst the Bugis-Makassar society in their homeland and being use for the traditional ceremony, calendar and literature; as well as in personal documents and handwritten items, for instance, in letters and notes. The script is also being taught in many schools in South Sulawesi and the usage are visible on some street signs across the province. Presently, there is also notable efforts by Indonesian typographers and graphic designers on introducing the script to a larger audience beyond its traditional borders.

In addition to Lontara, there is also another form of Bugis-Makassar traditional writing based on the Arabic-script, known as the Serang Alphabet. Relatively on an almost similar parallel module with its sister scripts, Jawi and Pegon for Malay and Javanese respectively, the Serang writing system incorporated the usage of Arabic elements with few additional characters to integrate with the local language.

=== Folklore and literary traditions ===
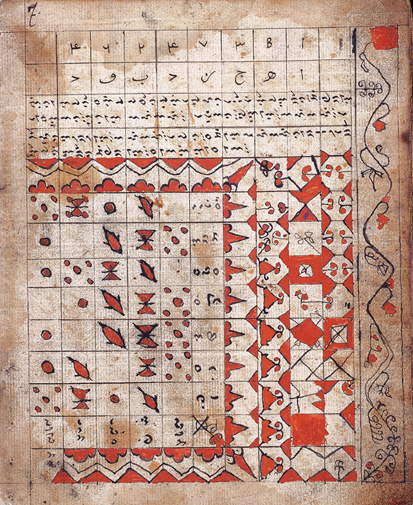
Kutika, a historical Bugis almanac with visible usage of Lontara and Arabic alphabets on the page.

Bugis literature connotes to the forms of literature expressed in the Bugis language — which comprises both written and oral traditions. The earliest works of Bugis literature were verbally transmitted, written literature began to arose and gradually codified with the evolution of the Lontara script by the 1400s. Its foundation largely coincides and intersects with the Makassarese literature — of whom it shared a closely related development with. The Bugis literary tradition mainly focuses on the wisdom, moral, social life and cultural environment of the Bugis identity.

Bugis folk literature is an oral composition deeply rooted in Bugis understanding and perception of life — in the form of prose, poetry and lyric. The classification raging from various short poems, élong; long narrative poems, tolo'; playful sayings, such as riddles, atteppungeng and nursery rhymes; magical spells, jappi, baca-baca; pre-Islamic ritual expressions, sabo, sessukeng, lawolo; precepts, pappaseng; and oaths of allegiance, aru. Other important oral heritage includes — stories, curita; sermons, katoba; and speeches. Although they are essentially verbal, many of the works are also subsequently being written in the language.

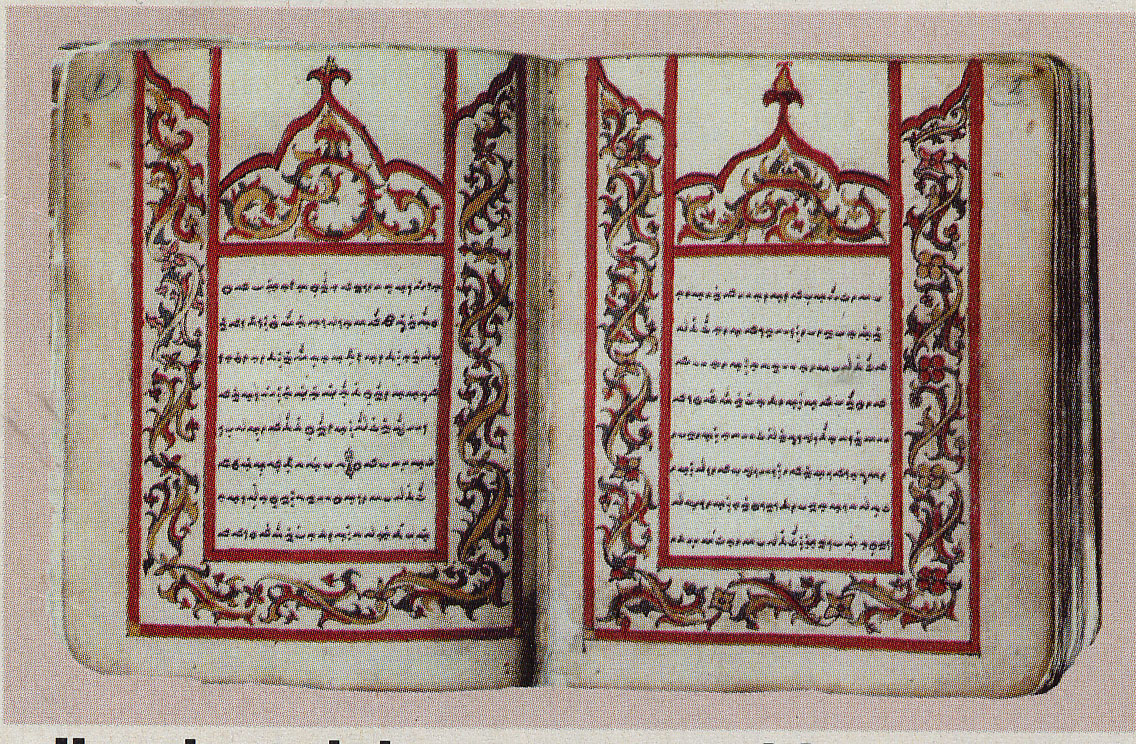
Excerpt from La Galigo, written in the Lontara script

Writings in the Lontara Script was likely to be first appeared around 1400. The earliest texts were inscribed on palm leaves, followed by volumes of handwritten composition on paper manuscripts, potentially from 1500 onwards, or even earlier. The works of literature commonly commissioned by writing specialists known as palôntara, the palôntara is being delegated the task as a researcher on creating and compiling the Bugis manuscripts. The manuscripts tend to be rich and varied, with a plethora of themes and subjects — including historical chronicles, poems, legal works, ritual texts, manuals, ethics, among few. Printed materials in the Bugis language were introduced in the latter half of the 19th century, albeit with a smaller circulation, such as in dictionaries, grammars books, chrestomathies and translations.

Consist of over 6,000 pages, the La Galigo is regarded as the magnum opus in the Bugis literary heritage. Composed in the old Bugis language, the saga traced its origin from the early oral traditions. The poetic text serves as a revered almanac and provide narrations about the ancient understanding on humanity and kingdoms. In the Bugis culture, episodes from La Galigo are commonly reenacted through chant and poetic recitation performance led by a La Galigo specialist, known as passure. The performance is sometimes held during festivals, wedding or during a house-moving ceremony. In 2012, two of the La Galigo manuscripts are included in UNESCO's Memory of the World Programme.

However, the largest collection of Bugis literature is in the form of family genealogies. It is regarded as an important family heirloom, especially amongst the members of nobility and aristocratic families. Some dated as early as 1400 — about two hundred years prior to their Islamisation, the early Bugis genealogies provide a rare glimpse on the culture and ideology of an early and literate Austronesian society.

=== Dress, textiles and weaving traditions ===
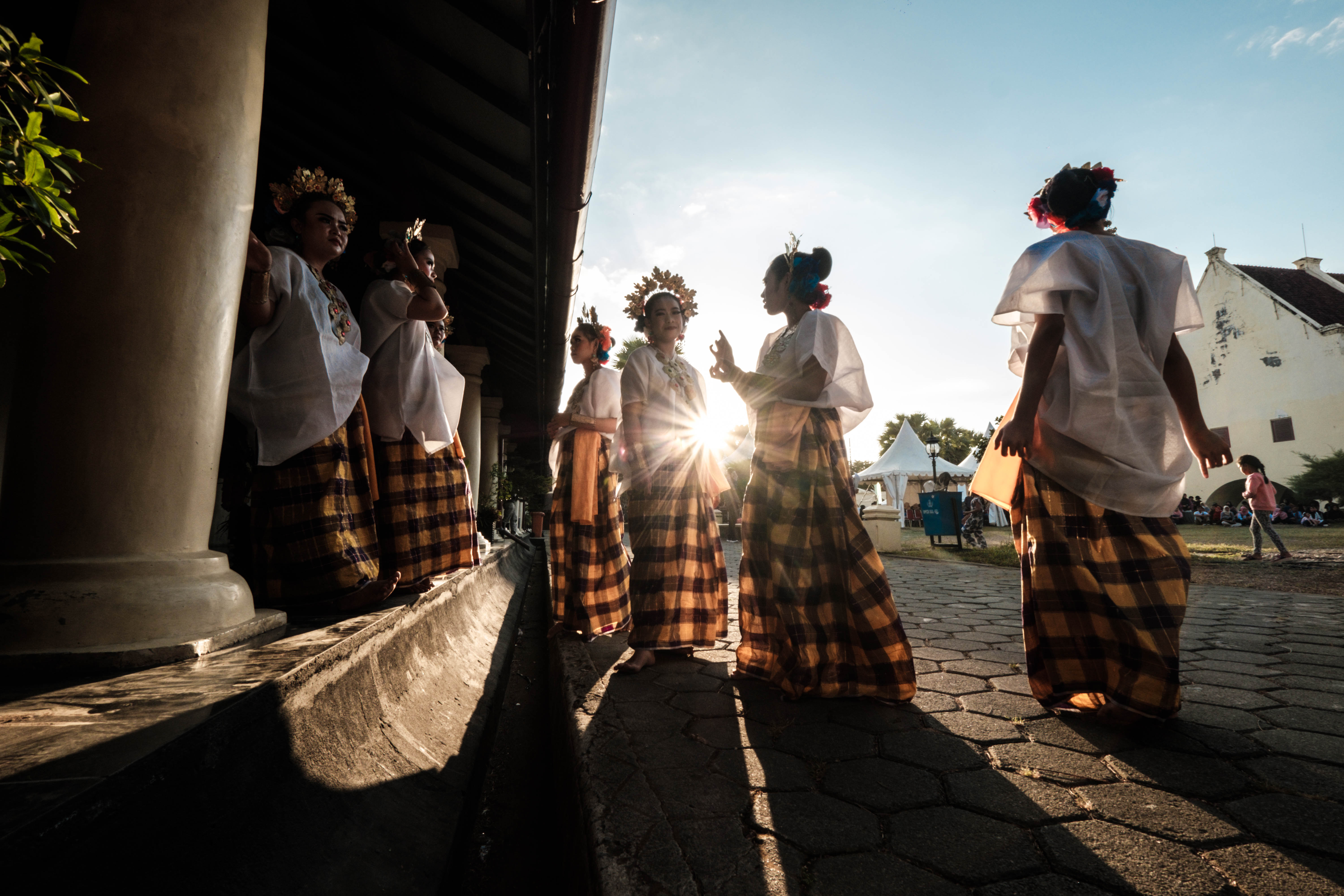
A group of girls clad in the Baju Bodo, sarong and traditional hair adornments in Fort Rotterdam, Makassar, Indonesia

In the traditional Bugis-Makassar culture, textiles and clothes are revered and occupied a special place in the society. Historically, the colours and motives donned by the wearer possessed an important indicator and serves as a defining symbol on the person's identity, age and status.

The term Baju Bodo derived from the Makassarese language, being described as "short clothing". Conversely, in the Bugis language, it is also known as Waju Tokko and Waju Ponco'. A short-sleeved tunic, the costume is commonly worn together with silk or a woven sarong. The attire traced its origin as early as the 9th century, following the introduction of muslin cloth by the foreign traders to the harbors of South Sulawesi. The textile, being thin and light, is highly suitable to accommodate the local tropical weather in the region. In addition to muslin cloth, the Baju Bodo is also commonly sourced from pineapple-fiber fabric and cotton.

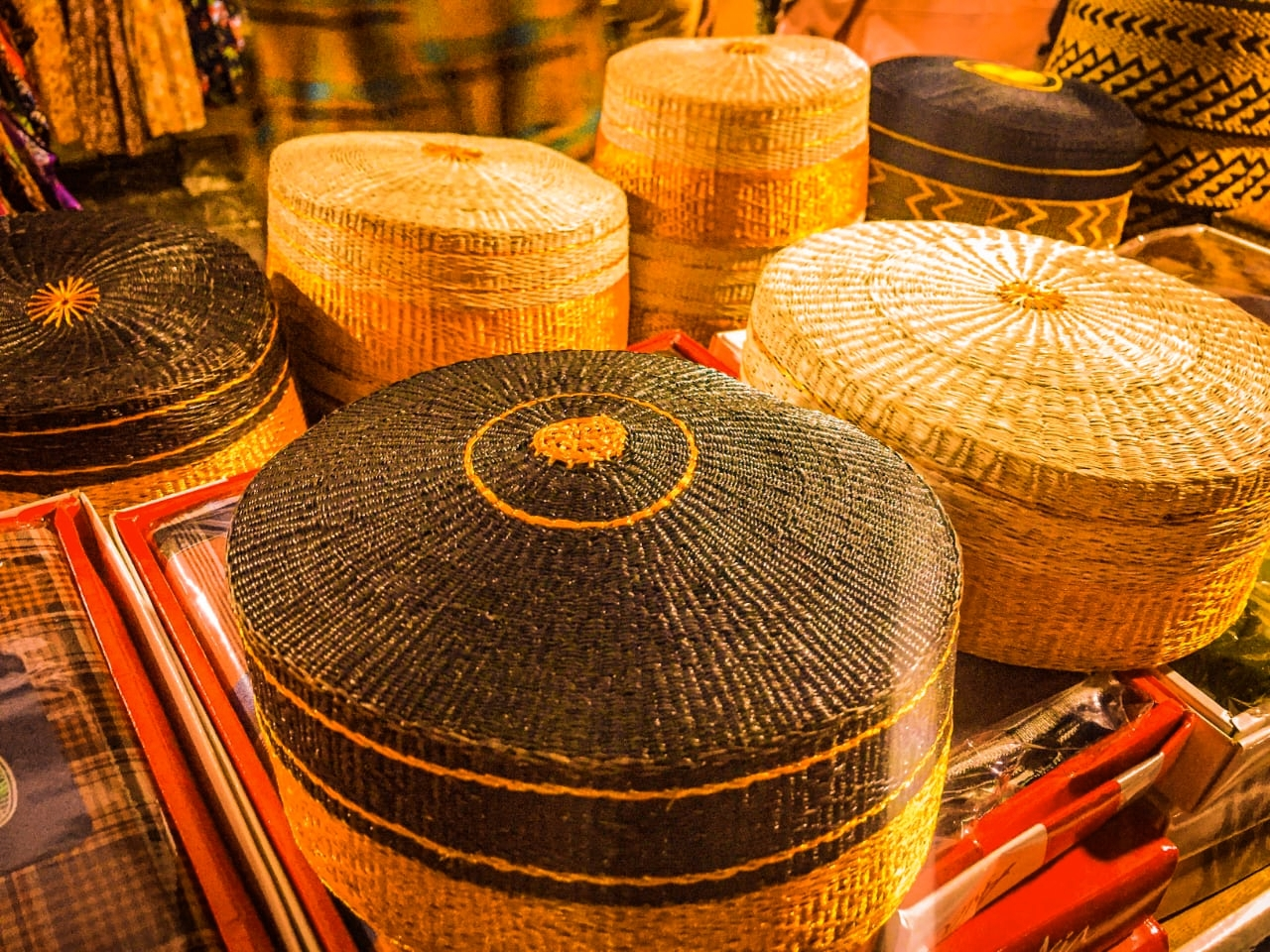
Songkok Recca, as being sold in a pasar malam in Tawau, Malaysia

With the rise of Islamisation among the Bugis-Makassar, another closely related form of Baju Bodo emerged. Having a longer sleeve, the Baju La'bu (from Makassarese la'bu 'long'), also known as Bodo Panjang (both defined as "long cloth") is tailored in accordance of Islamic interpretation of Aurat and modesty. The Baju La'bu is also traditionally made from silk, a departure from the semi-transparent and translucent fabric of its predecessor.

The Bugis-Makassarese handloom industry potentially commenced in the 1400s. The locally made sarung motives were initially basic, having rudimentary stripes of vertical, horizontal or in a checkered pattern, potentially inspired by Sulappa Eppa (the four elements) foundations. By the 1600s, the designs are becoming progressively ornamented, with the inclusion of a multitude of geometrical shapes, contour and sequence. Almost in a coordination with the function of Baju Bodo in the past, the motives and design of the sarung would also be used to denote the status of its wearer. The sarung material is usually sourced from silk and cotton.

The corresponding mode for the Bugis male is known as Jas Tutu' or Jas Tutup (an "enclosed coat"), the garment is in a form of long-sleeved coat with a collar. The Jas Tutu is also synonymous to be worn with the Songkok recca/Pabiring/Songkok To Bone (Bugis songkok), Lipa' Sabbe (sarong) and a gold or silver-coloured button. The Bugis-styled Songkok is made of woven rattan and golden thread. During a traditional wedding ceremony, the groom would also accompanied by a highly elaborated accessories, including Tataroppeng (Keris), Pabekkeng (belt), Rope (Songket), Sigara (headgear), Salempang (sash), Gelang (bangle) and Sapu tangan (handkerchief).

In the present day, the Baju Bodo and Jas Tutu are largely being reserved as a formal wear, the sightings are common during weddings, as well as in other ceremonial and cultural functions.

=== Culinary traditions ===
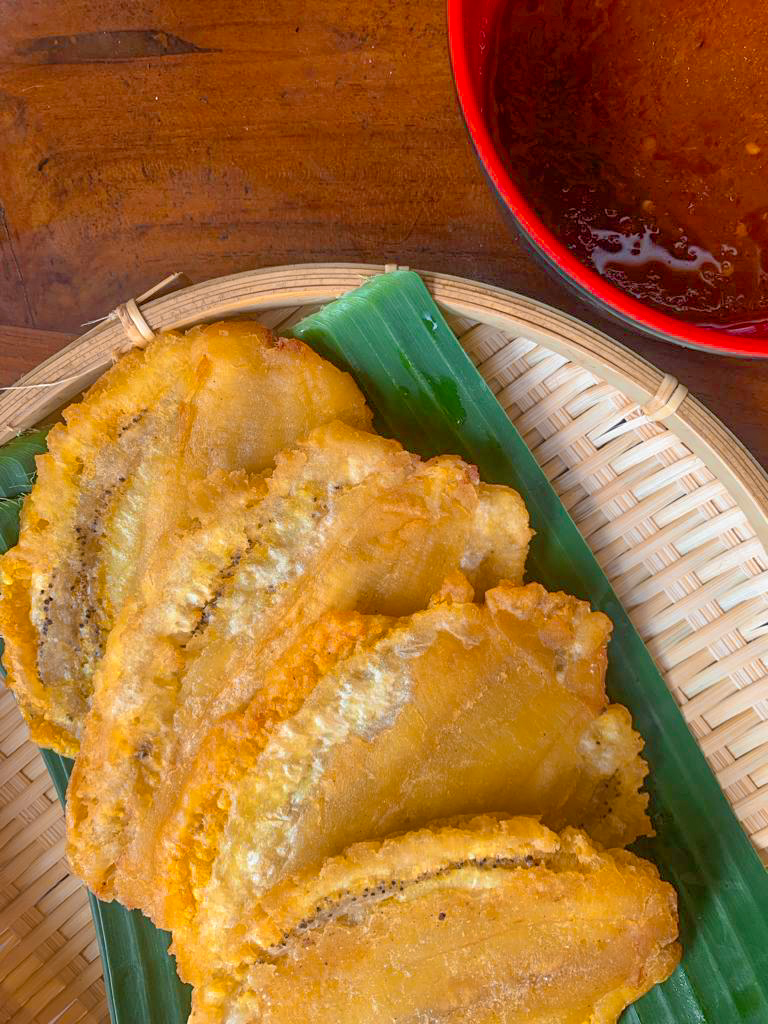
Sanggara Peppe, flattened and double-fried plantains, a crispy traditional snack commonly served with sambel

The Bugis cuisine constitutes an essential part of its heritage, comprises various culinary styles and recipes frequently associated with the Bugis people. It shares many common gastronomical traditions and characteristics with the surrounding Makassarese, Mandarese and Torajans. Many of the meals are indigenously developed in the island of Sulawesi, with a focus on native ingredients; while others exhibit a notably stronger outside influences and customized according to the local palates.

Foreign cooking techniques in the South Sulawesi cuisine can be seen on the adoption of Jalangkote, a small fried pie adopted from Portuguese papeda. The fillings for Jalangkote usually consist of rice vermicelli (denoting Chinese influence) combined with sliced vegetables, boiled eggs and mincemeat. Meanwhile Indian elements are visible and demonstrated in the localised dishes, for instance the creamy Gagape, Toppa Lada and the spicy Juku palumara.

There is also a wide array of cuisines that signifies a bolder endemic origin: Rice cakes are particularly popular with the likes of Burasa' and Tumbu/Lapa-lapa/Langka. The rice dumplings are steamed and wrapped in leave containers with coconut milk, thus contributing to its rich and creamy flavor. It is usually served as a substitute for white rice and eaten together with soups or other side dishes. Another distinguished forms of rice cake in the Bugis-Makassar community includes Gogos — roasted glutinous rice with fish fillings, wrapped in banana leaf. It is commonly eaten as a snack.

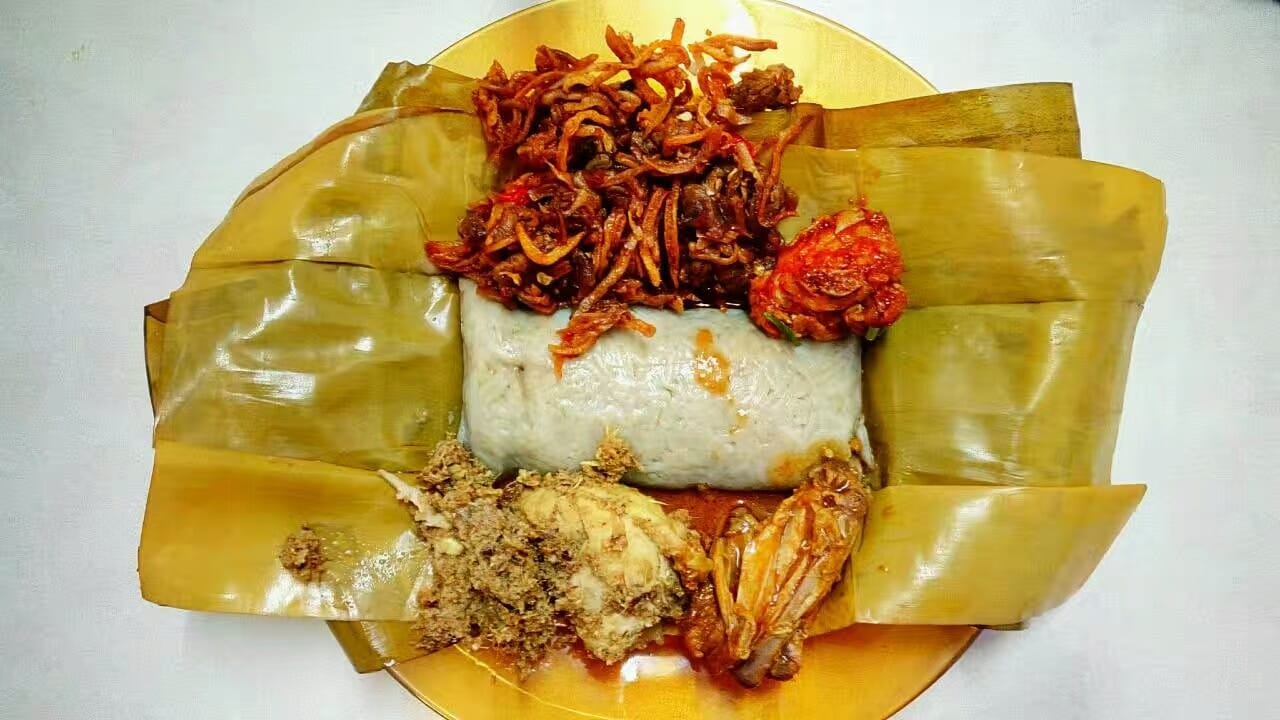
A few home-cooked Bugis classics during the Hari Raya celebration. Burasa' (center); clockwise from top: Goré-Goré Daging, Ayam Saus Merah, Nasu Kari and Nasu Likku' .

The peninsula's long coastline has contributed a great fishing industry in the region, creating oceanic produce as an important part of the meal. Dishes such as Pa'Deme (anchovies sambal), Bajabu (serundeng), Lawa Bale (marinated raw fish) and the clear broth soups of Nasu Bale and Nassu Meti captures its extensive maritime connection.

In addition to seafood, there is also a diverse culinary traditions with the emphasis on meat, which can be seen in the hearty slow cooked dishes, namely Nasu Likku', Nasu Palekko and Goré-Goré. The meals are usually acted as an accompanying side dish to complement the Nasi Putih (plain white rice), or in other cases, the rice cakes.

Banana occupied a major importance after rice in the Bugis staple, as it is widely cultivated in South Sulawesi. Aside from being eaten fresh after a meal, Banana-based meals are extensive in the forms of snacks and desserts — raging from the sweet tasting Berongko (steamed Banana pudding), caramelized Sanggara' Balanda, to crispy and savory snacks such as Sanggara Pappek (smashed bananas).

Other popular meals associated with the Bugis includes congee dishes — Barobbo (rice and corn porridge) and the sago-based Kapurung; and traditional Kues, notably the Kue bugis, Kue Dange, Kue Sikaporo and Bolu Peca. Due to the extensive and continuous friendly interactions as well as prevalent intermarriage with the kindred Makassarese people, many of the unique Makassarese meals are also widely enjoyed by the Bugis, including Coto Makassar, Sop Sodara, Pallubasa, Pallu Kacci, Pallumara and Konro, or desserts like Cucuru' Te'ne and Es Palu Butong.

Beyond their native soil, Burasa' and other Bugis-Makassar traditional cuisines are also commonly presented as a ceremonial dish by their diaspora community. It is prepared as a significant legacy to honor their ancestral roots from the plains of South Sulawesi.

=== Weaponry and military traditions ===
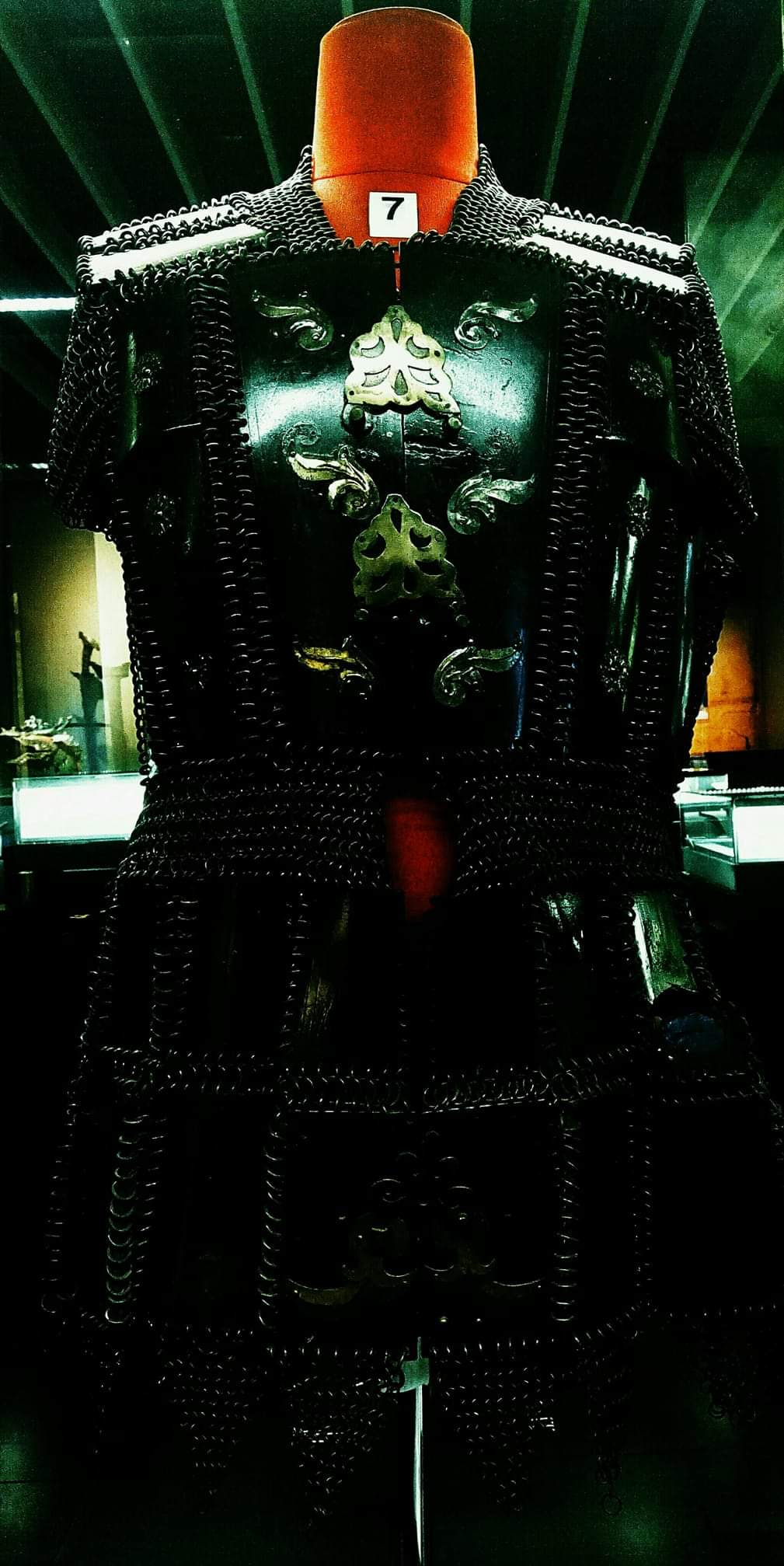
A Bugis baju lamina from the 18th century in the National Museum of Malaysia; one of the armors that aided their historical political expansion throughout insular Southeast Asia.

Taniya ugi narekko de'na punnai kawali
(A person is not regarded as a Bugis without a Kawali)

— Bugis traditional words of wisdom

A plethora of blades, knives and firearms constitute the arsenal of Bugis-Makassar weaponry. However, the Badik, also known as Kawali, is hailed as the traditional weapon strongly associated with their identity and possessed a revered status in the sociological construct of the Bugis-Makassar society. The item is not solely perceived as a mere weapon, but as an emblem designated to represent the personal character of its owner. It is historically used as a vital tool for hunting animals and as a self-defense mechanism.

In the traditional Bugis-Makassar understanding, the hierarchal level of Badik is regarded as a second after the Keris. A far-cry from the Badik which known to have an almost universal usage throughout all ranks of the society, the Keris Pusaka (the "Dynasty Keris") is reserved as an important family regalia amongst the elite royal houses in South Sulawesi. Thus, historically the Badik received a prevalent identity as a companion for the Bugis-Makassar man.

In the past, Badik is used as a tool of defense to protect an individual and the family honor. The doctrine is largely based on the philosophical interpretation of Siri, a cornerstone of the Bugis-Makassar culture, siri represents a responsibility to maintain the dignity in the society. The concept is historically entranced in the cognitive psyche amongst the people and traditionally become a binding force on the moral values and social system. Badik is also commonly passed from one generation to another, acting as an important family heirloom.

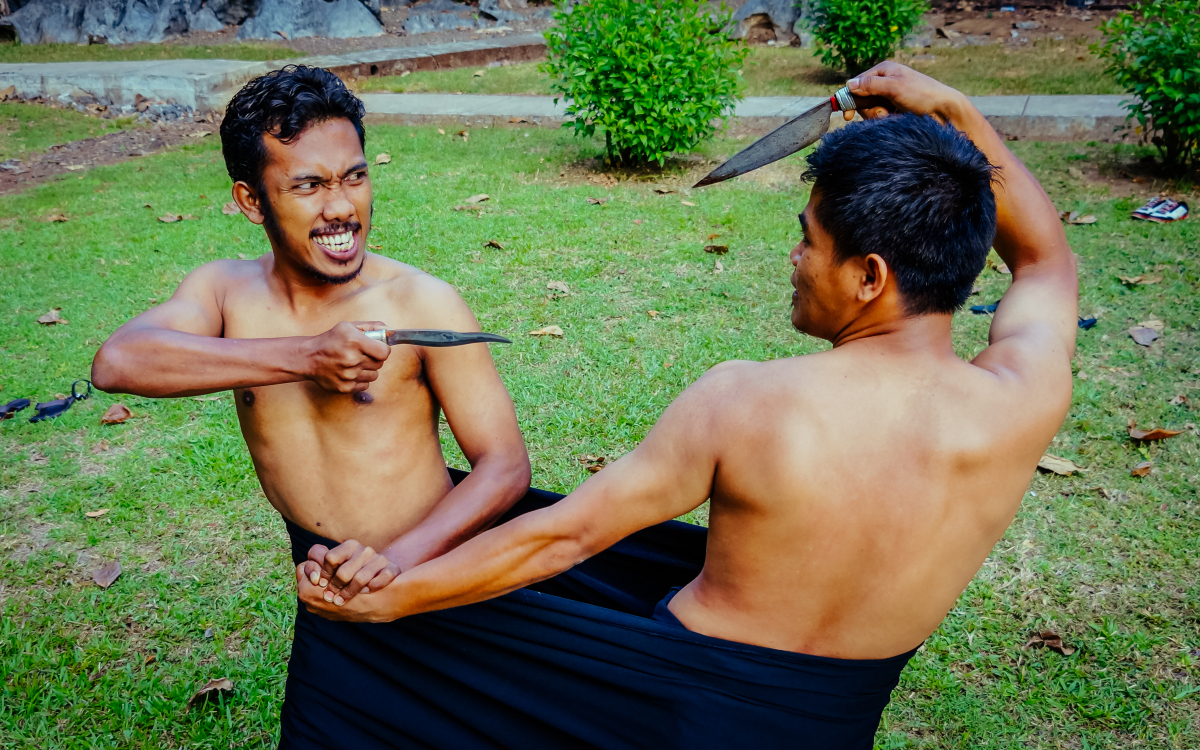
The ancient sword fighting duel of Sigajang laleng lipa, commonly staged in a single sarong. Both of the contenders are holding a Kawali

Another important sword owned by the Bugis is the Keris, also known as Tappi. It has some minor different features in contrast to the Javanese Keris; however, the Bugis Keris is noted to bear a closer anatomical resembles with the Malay-version of the dagger, the item potentially being introduced by the Malays to the people of South Sulawesi. Almost parallel with the Badik, the Keris equally carried a revered symbol amongst many Bugis-Makassar people.

In addition to Badik and Keris, they were known to host a multitude of classical armaments. Most of the items are collectively classified under the parewa bessi (Iron weapons) category made by the Bugis-Makassar blacksmiths. Some of the other notable collections include Alamang and Sundang, a long-sword; Bessing, a spear; Kanna, shield; Pantu', a traditional fighting stick; Waju Rante, armor; and Tado, a trapping rope.

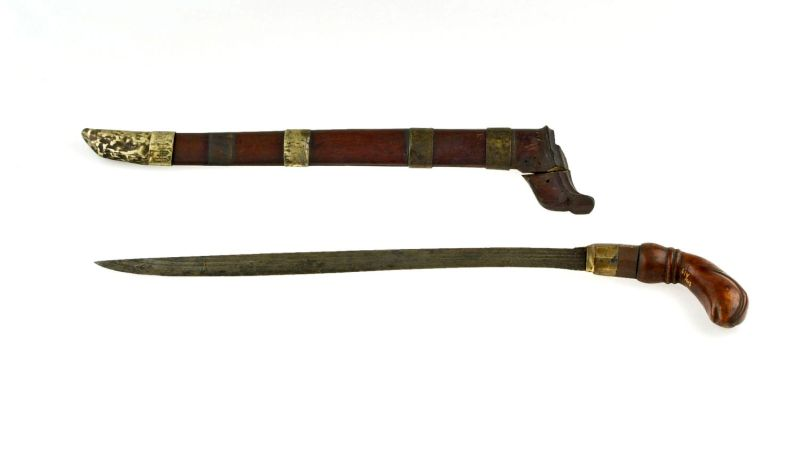
Kawali, also known as Badik. The traditional Bugis-Makassar dagger.

The art of weapon among the Bugis-Makassar is constantly developed through the millennia. The ancient peoples of South Sulawesi are recorded to have a usage of blowpipes with poisoned darts, spears, short swords, kris and rattan helmets. By the early modern era, the Bugis-Makassar gained further exposure on the artillery knowledge with the introduction of various firearms: muskets, culverins and cannons that enhance their warfare and combatant skills. Mail armor with metal plates (baju lamina) is estimated to be used starting from this era, and still being worn until the 19th century.

The strong mutual relationship between the arms development and its militaristic culture formed the advantageous momentum that fueled to their quest for political advancement and influence outside from the traditional Bugis-Makassar homeland. It become one of the wielding tools that seals their historical figures and status as soldiers, mercenaries, warriors and fighters throughout the maritime realm.

=== Traditional architecture ===
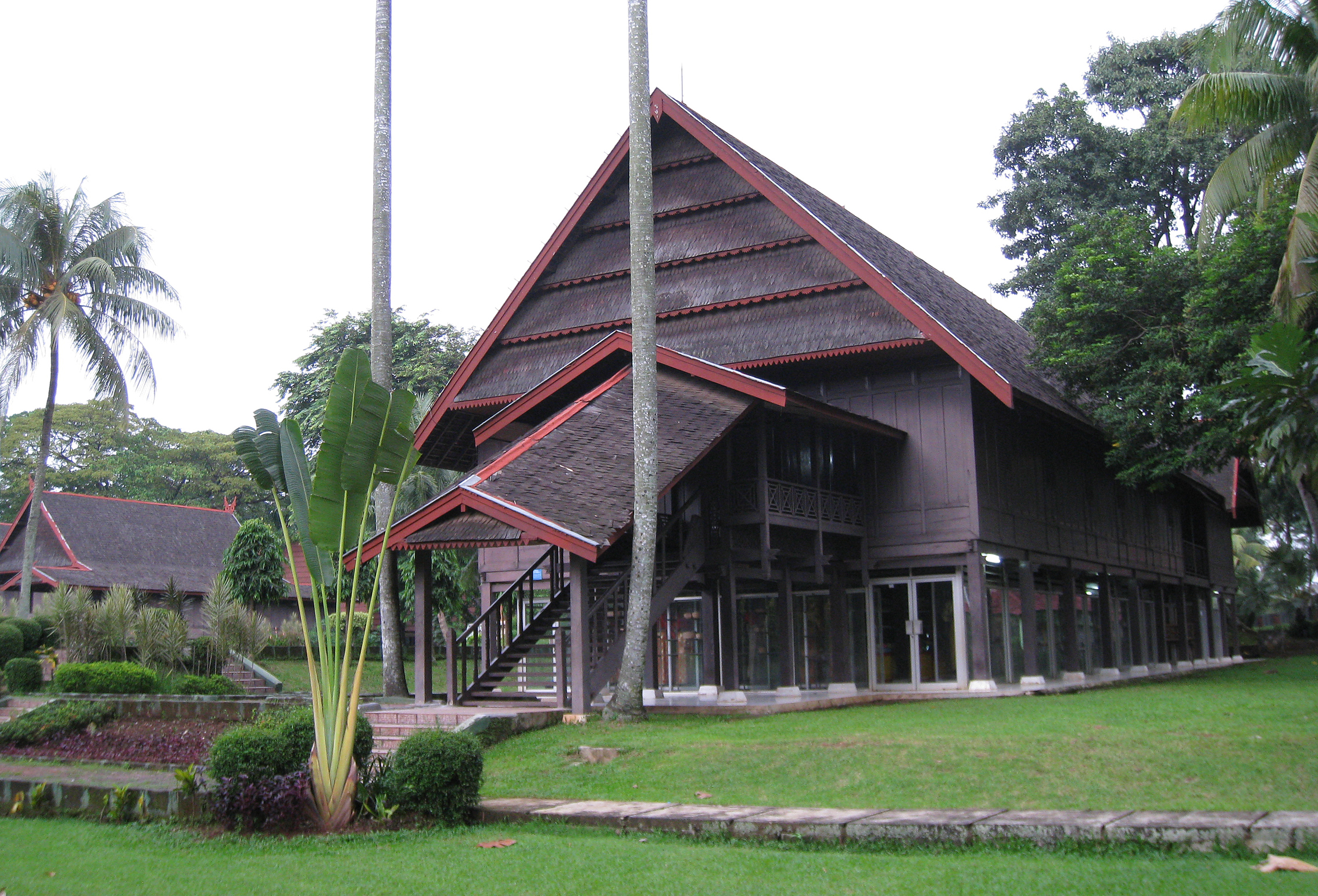
The Bugis-Makassar house in Taman Mini Indonesia Indah, Jakarta

In the Bugis society, architecture is regarded as an emblem of philosophy, designed to endorse the occupier belief, faith and understanding about cosmos and universe. It is strongly rooted in its long and rich history, blending elements on the native interpretation of cosmology with culture, faith, mythology, aesthetic and functionality. The Bugis architectural style is broadly classed together with the Makassarese, of whom it shares strong architectural features and identity.

Based on the Bugis philosophical understanding, a home is regarded as the legitimate expression of the spiritual rite of passage as a human being: a place to be born, a place to raised and nurtured as a child, a place to become a husband and wife, and a place to perish. Consequently, the habitation is designed to be solemn, sacred and highly revered. It provides ones with a place for solitude, energy, nourishment, well-being and honour to its dwellers. The presence of a home in the Bugis society is part-and-parcel with life, hence home ownership is regarded in utmost importance — }to commemorate life and to become a beacon symbol of life.

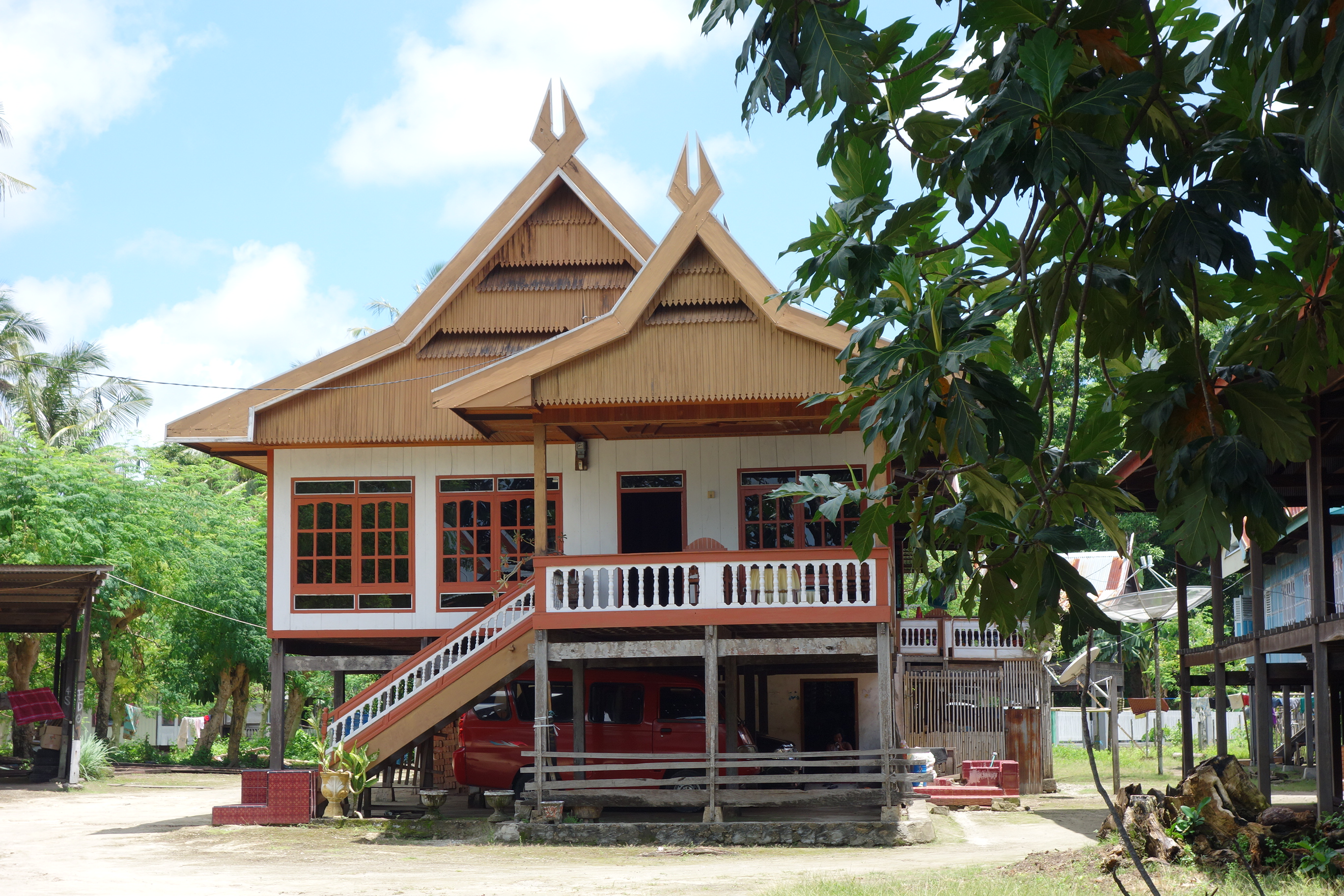
A traditional Bugis dwelling in South Sulawesi

In the Bugis culture, architecture is not only solely perceived as a question of practice, but a subject of theological dialogue. The formula of Sulapa Eppa (the four elements) was interpreted and constructed with such intention. The layout plan for the Bugis buildings would commonly have a rectangular and symmetrical consistency, the aim is to intergrade with the early Bugis understanding that the universe is in a form of a giant rhombus and the four ingredients that created the universe (wind, water, fire and earth); together with the four wind directions (north, south, east and west). Thus, the Bugis houses would traditionally faces north, as an origin for positive energy; or towards east, the dawn of light.

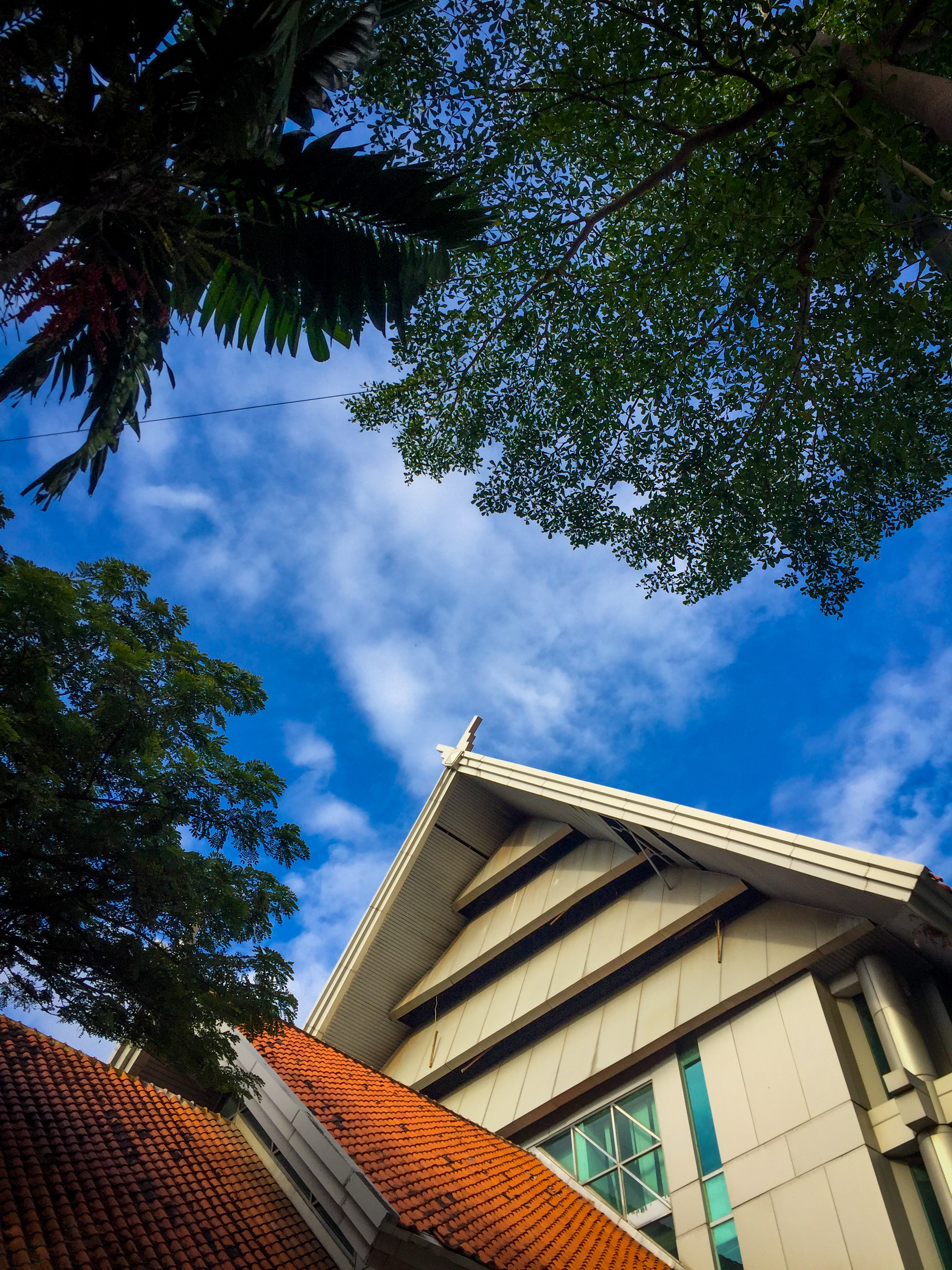
The traditional Bugis-Makassar architectural principles are also widely adopted in many of the contemporary buildings in South Sulawesi

The houses were commissioned into three separate levels, signifying the three position of the universe based on the pre-Islamic Bugis interpretation. Rakeang (the upper world) — a tribute to the heavens above, the attic is designed to be the apex of the house and it is regarded to be a sacred place to store rice, crops and important heirlooms. Ale Bola (the middle world), appeared for a respect to the human world, thus represented by the living and the common space of the house. Awa Bola (the underworld), a place of dark and ferocious, this concept was exemplified by the shed and where the livestock are stored beneath the human dwelling.

The concept of rupa-tau ('likeness of a person') is also extensively explored and adopted in the Bugis architectural principles. This led to the building structured as a grandiose manifestation of an anatomical relationship. The housing framework was monumentally characterized by distinct components based on a human physique: Aje-bola (the foot), by the stilts of the house; ale-bola (body), the common living space; ulu-bola (the head), the roof; and posi-bola (the navel) by the middle area of the house.

The development of the Bugis architecture is originated on the belief that a home is constructed with an optimistic faith for a greater future. Based on the classical Bugis myth and understanding, the stars, skies and constellations held a great divine significance; in response, a human is entrusted to maintain the harmonious arrangement of the universe — in order to have a safer and tranquil life, as well as to avoid natural calamities (notably floods, landslides, tornado and earthquake). Thus, such ethos and essences are extensively emulated, absorbed and vividly radiated in the traditional Bugis architectural articulations.

=== Maritime, mercantile and migratory traditions ===
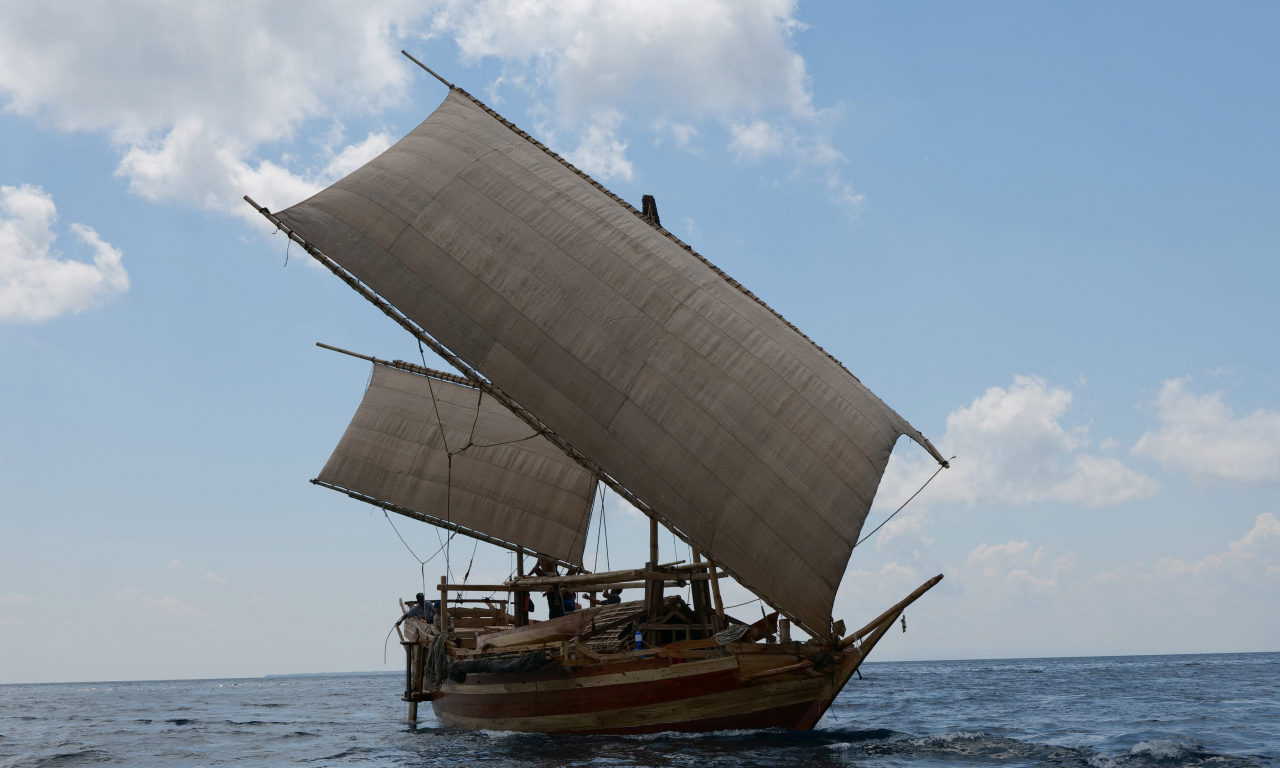
Padewakang, historically used by the Bugis-Makassar-Mandar as a major trading vessel before being eclipsed by the palari.

Across archipelagic Southeast Asia, the Bugis-Makassar were known as sailors, navigators and seafaring traders. Their naval foundation largely coordinated with the extensive shipbuilding traditions, nautical skills and the dominant presence in the inter-insular trade routes.

Conversely, they too acquired the title as "The Vikings of Southeast Asia". Their extensive maritime and trading expedition has historically bought them to be as one of the notable regional players in the transoceanic journeys to Indochina, Macau, Manila, Papua and northern Australia, together with the Southeast Asian islands that lies between these areas. Their ships were commonly use to carry and transport exotic spices, sandalwood, textiles, rice, luxury marine products, porcelains, pearls and other important goods and materials across the ancient spice trade routes.

During the Age of Sail, their seafaring odysseys were largely aided by padewakang, one of the early type of Bugis-Makassar vessel, which later morphed into the palari. Steep in history, the first of such watercraft was born based on the legendary tradition of Sulawesi.

Up until the nineteenth century, the classic Padekawang was traditionally led by a captain, known as nakoda or anakoda; followed by his second-in-command, the juragang. It is also usual for the ship to have two steersman, jurumudi — delegated the task on directing the ship's course; two jurubatu — sounders, responsible to measure the depth on approaching the coast, reefs or shoals; and a single secretary — known as jurutulisi, acting as an agent on behalf of the owner of the vessel. The names are largely adopted from the Malay language, with an influence from Persian, such as the term of nakhoda.

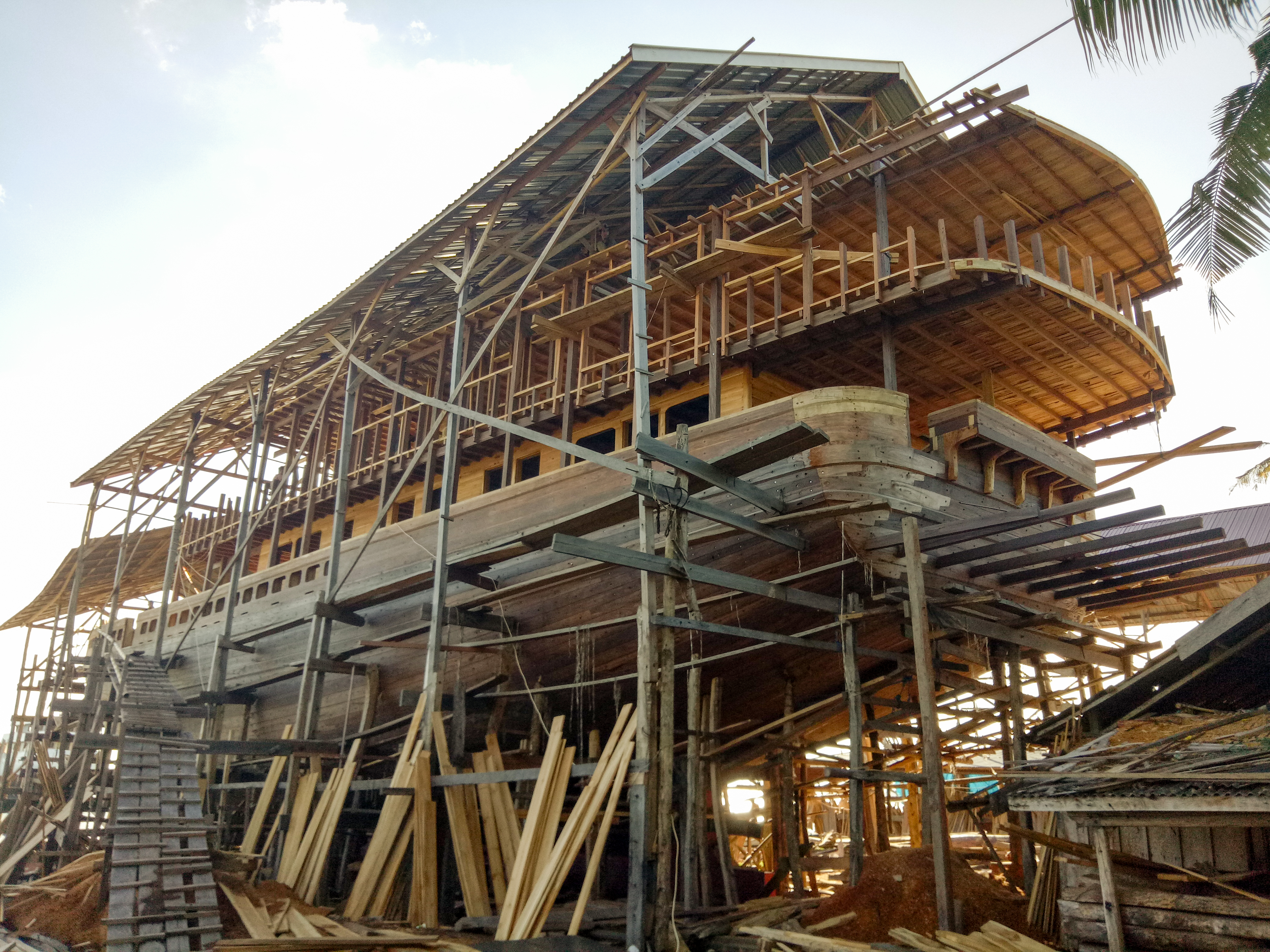
A pinisi construction facility in Bulukumba, among the major cradles of ship-making industry in South Sulawesi.

In order to identify the course of their maritime routes, the sailors would typically inclined to use a multitude of convergent nautical practice, from determining the rising and setting points of the sun; the location horizon, stars and constellations; the marine environment — the flow of the oceanic swell, the form of the waves and the water appearance; fauna — the actions of the fish and the flight arrangement of the birds; the wind directions; and specific geographical landmarks.

The original pinisi-rigged ship (palari), is about 50 to 70 feet (15.24 to 21.34 m) in length overall, with light laden waterline of 34 to 43 feet (10.36 to 13.11 m). Smaller palari is only about 10 m in length. A two-masted sailing vessel, the name "pinisi" derives from the type of gaff rig, use for its configuration. Its unique canted rectangular mainsails and tripod masts give its unparalleled design composition, a departure from other western ships. In the contemporary era, palari is also equipped with motors for its seafaring journeys.

There are many shipbuilding centers in the region, including Ara, Tanah Lemo, and Bira. However, the Konjo, a subgroup of the Makassarese, are known as of pinisi-rigged ships, enjoying a long tradition of watercraft and boat-production, a knowledge inherited from fathers to sons for centuries.

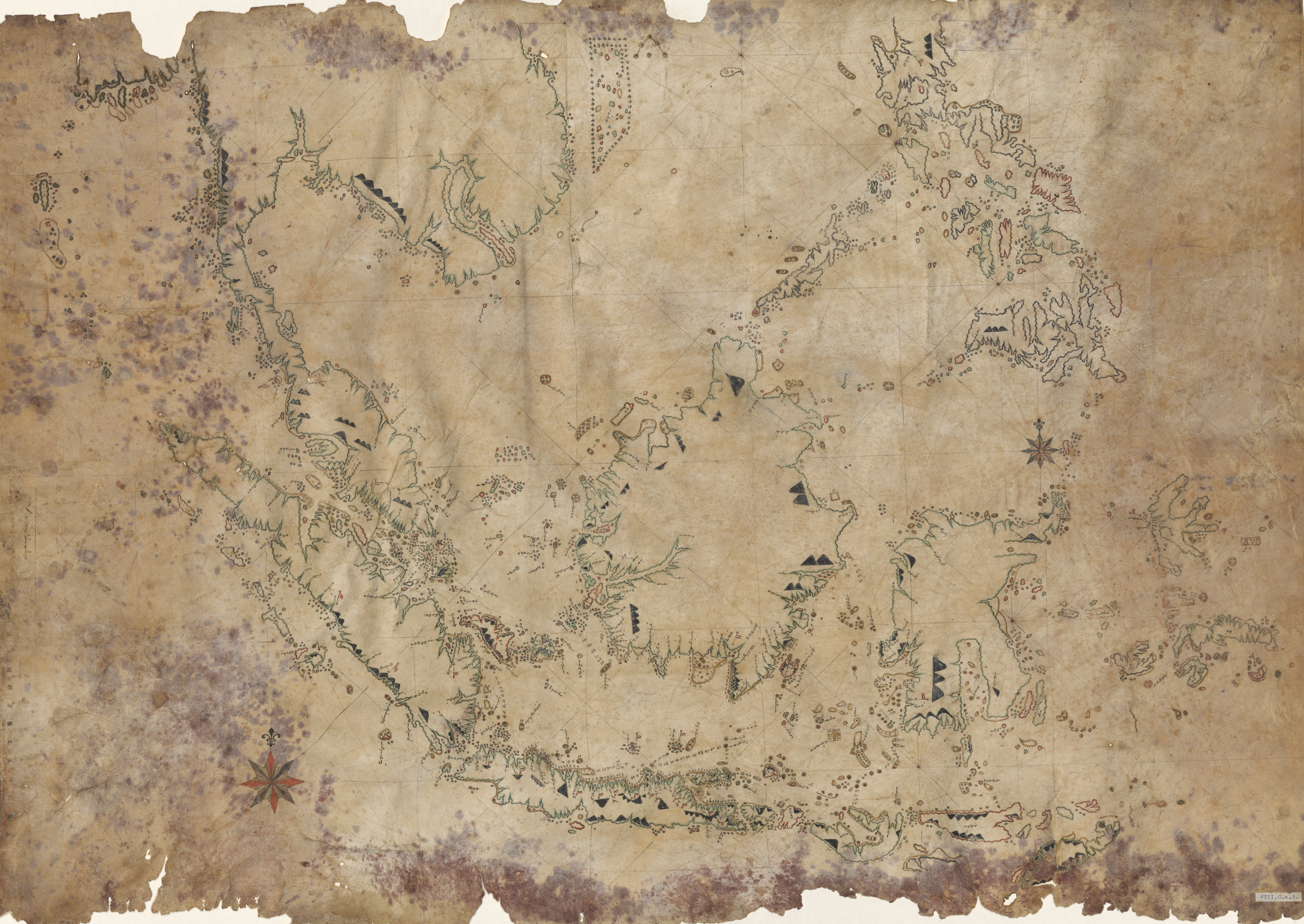
A map of Maritime Southeast Asia recorded in the Bugis-Makassar writing system (c.1820)

For the Konjos in Bulukumba, the boatmaking identity is deeply rooted to their lives as a precious embodiment of art, culture and rituals. Being a highly dedicated boatsmith community, the Konjo people are traditionally restricted from sailing to the seas, as their elders feared that their clan would not return to their homeland, creating a perilous risk of losing their valuable shipbuilding wisdom amongst their kinsmen. Thus in South Sulawesi, the transoceanic sailing responsibility were vastly executed by their closely related brethren — the Bugis and Makassarese.

The rich nautical culture of Bugis-Makassar is equally captured and reinforced by a plethora of ships — ranging from penjajap, warship; pajala, a smaller boat, also used for fishing; palari, another descendant of the padewakang; Lambo, a trading boat; and the early ships of Somba Lete and sompe tanja. These vessels collectively have left a significant impact on the local and regional development.

As the seafaring identity began to take root in the coastal South Sulawesi society, it gradually become a profound icon that navigated their influence and presence in the region. Following the Bugis-Makassar migratory tradition known as sompe (to sail) and malleke' dapureng; it was here, from among these historical ships, vessels and boats that many Bugis and Makassar man, woman and children braved away from their traditional heartland in search of economic pursuits, prosperity and opportunities, while others embarked for an educational experience, adventure, personal dignity, military quest or prestigious political ambitions. Thus, most, if not all Bugis in the diaspora may ultimately traced their ancestral origin to one of the Pasompe' (a term for people who sailed/ventured beyond their native soil). Tales and trails from the past waves of sails and settlements can still be witnessed until the present day, evidently illustrated by their extensive centuries-old ethnic enclaves and various diaspora communities established throughout the islands and coastal regions of maritime Southeast Asia.

=== Rice and agrarian traditions ===
Rice is life for the Bugis

— Leonard Andaya, Anthropologist

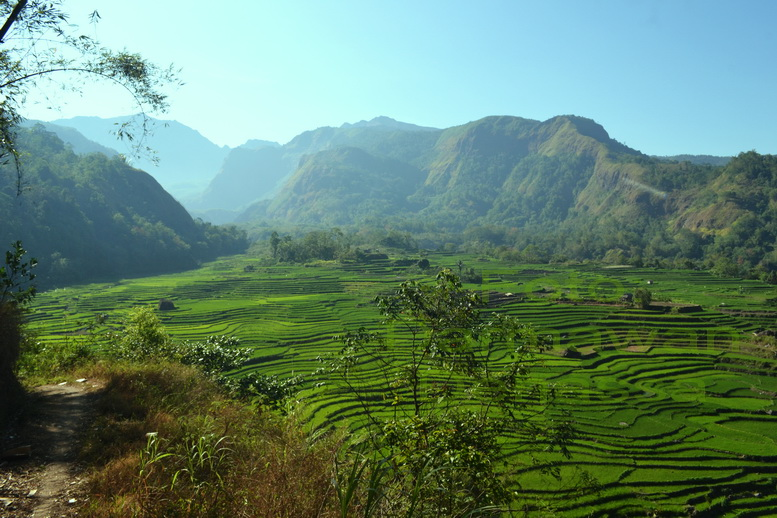
Terraced paddy fields as nestled in the agricultural landscape of the Bugis-Makassar region

A visible departure from the extensive maritime and nautical culture dominated by their coastal brethren, the inland Bugis-Makassar country bear witness to its strong agricultural legacy. Regarded as among the most important crop amongst the society, rice has been cultivated across the peninsula for centuries. The grain has been deeply ingrained to their agricultural way of life for generations. It is not only hailed as a primary food source on the diet, but also woven into the social, legends, theories, economic, political and ideological fabric. In a sense, their traditional identity is also being coexisted by an agrarian culture.

The simple grain is regarded as among the essence of their traditions, it has indeed enjoyed a complex and long connections with the Bugis-Makassar. The earliest trace of rice in maritime Southeast Asia was found in Ulu Leang Cave, in Maros, South Sulawesi. Dated between 4000 BC to 2000 BC, the grains potentially tied up with the arrival of their Austronesian ancestors to the region, or among the earlier Toalean hunter-gatherer society.

Rice serves a nourishment, deeply embedded to their historical development. By the 14th century, their radical transformation from local warlords to major kingdoms was largely coincides by the unprecedented population boom across the peninsula, which in turn being a correlated result intersected from the earlier improvement of the agricultural practices. Blood, sweat and tears have had been shed over the soil in the quest of favorable harvests, for instance during the 16th century, the Ajatappareng confederation (constituting the Bugis states of Sidenreng, Rappang, Suppa', Bacukiki, Alitta', and Sawitto) was incorporated by the expansionist pursuit by Gowa, driven by their ambitions to control the bountiful local corps of the region.

In their ancient beliefs and understanding, rice was perceived as a symbolism associated with providence and of creation, as well as blessing and joy by linking ancient customs, mythology and the people. The cultivation of the grains has had led to the development of an economic life circle centered primarily around the core of agriculture. Rooted in the pre-Islamic belief system, the mappalili (paddy growing season) was organized among the Bugis to pray for a plentiful crop season, while the grand harvest festival was held by the agrarian societies act as a joyous thanksgiving conclusion after a successful harvest. Rice is also highly venerated, based on the historical Bugis manual-almanac known as Kutika, only during specific schedules, day and time were permitted for cultivating activities; at home, the rice is traditionally stored at the attic of the house, signifying its zenith position in the social order; while during war, the destruction of rice fields was perceived as a highly forbidden taboo.

The creed of Bugis-Makassar states was undoubtedly built on horticulture standing as its salient pillar. Rice farming also has influenced many other aspects of their old economic activities. During the medieval era, it become one of the earliest main commodities of exports from the South Sulawesi heartlands to the rest of the insular Southeast Asia. The commodities may also serves as an early guidance to their fundamental mercantile and enterprising skills, before being rapidly evolved into amongst their major tools of trade during their maritime involvement in the regional trade routes.

The rice-reigned supremacy and its strong agrarian foundations of the South Sulawesi people persist until this day. In 2022, the province was estimated to produce 5.4 million tonnes of rice, becoming among the prominent rice bowls in modern-day Indonesia.

=== Festivals, celebrations and religious traditions ===
The Islamisation of Bugis-Makassar states initiated by Luwu and Gowa in the 17th century has greatly morphed the religious landscape throughout the peninsula. As a consequence, most of the liturgical festivals by the Bugis are primarily coordinated with the Islamic calendar, albeit embraced with a strong sense on the localized cultural orientations.

The biannual Hari Raya (eid) celebrations of Idul Fitri and Idul Adha are regarded as the largest festivals for the Bugis. The Idul Fitri (known as Maleppe, meaning "release" in the Bugis language) serves as a triumphal rite after completing a month of fasting and religious activities during Ramadhan. In the Bugis language, the term Mallepe holds a philosophical symbol as a release from the sins and the bad habits of a person. While Idul Adha is a religious observance commemorating the sacrifice made by Ibrahim (Abraham).

A day before eid many Bugis families prepare Burasa' and Tumbu rice cakes in a tradition known as Ma'burasa and Ma'tumbu. The tradition of visiting friends, relatives and holding a grand feast for visitors are also central — known as Massiara, the visits usually commenced after the eid prayers.

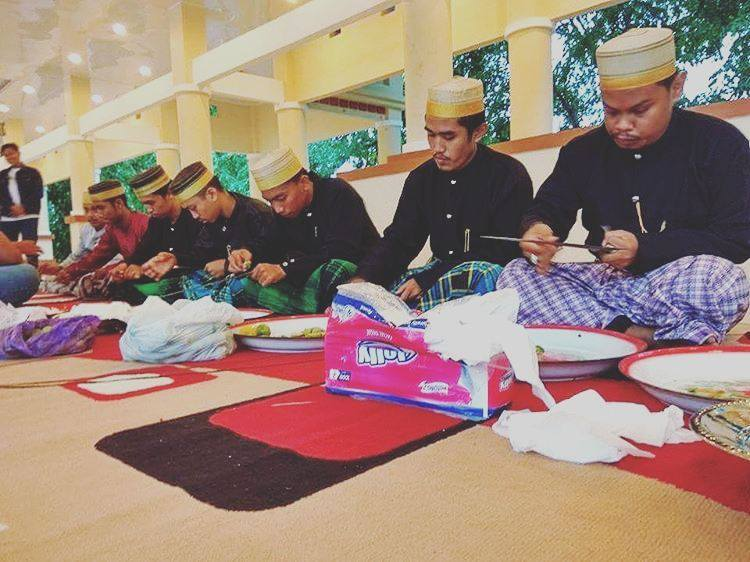
Men in formal Jas Tutup attire in the Royal Courts of Bone at a Mattompang ceremony

Other common traditions during eid includes Mabbaca-baca, a solemn thanksgiving dua gathering and feast led by the community religious leaders known as 'Puang Anre Guru or Daeng Imam. A visit the final resting place of the departed love ones is also a major commonplace during the season, in the custom known as Masiara Kuburu, the visit to the grave is regarded as a gesture of love, respect and honour.

Other Islamic holidays Bugis observe include Ramadan and Maulu/ma maulu' (Mawlid), honoring the birth of Muhammad, when special ceremonial meals and colorful eggs are given to the mosque attendees; Esso Sura (Ashura), remembrance of Muharram, where a special porridge (known as Bubu Petu and Bella Pitunrupa) are prepared, the day also marked as a major shopping period for the Bugis-Makassar, as many would traditionally buy new house utensils during the Ashura. Furthermore, the Bugis and Makassar families would also arrange Massuro Baca, special ceremonial doa and feast held a week before Ramadhan to remember the departed relatives, as well as a preparation to cleanse the inner-self before the holy month.

Islamic elements are also materialized during celebrations on an individual level. Being a predominantly Muslim community, the act of Mabbarazanji/Barzanji (Mawlid al-Barzanjī), communal prayers and praise to Muhammad is regarded as among the focal points during such ceremonies. The Bugis would commonly organized a selamatan feast for divine favor, protection, thanksgiving and gratitude — including weddings, newborn celebration, aqiqah, house construction ceremony, sending a pilgrim for umrah and hajj, and funerals.

The importance of such personal and communal ceremonies collectively act as a testament of their mainstream ethnic character. It serves as a bind, propelled to their rite of passage as a Muslim and a manifestation of their cultural identity. The events also performed as a juxtaposition, intertwined between the essence of religion and custom; together with a sense of responsibility to solidify their values into the contemporary era.

Historically, there are also some regional events deeply rooted to their ancient beliefs, reflected by their pre-Islamic past, geographical location, local demographic and occupation. In a few agrarian Bugis communities, the grand harvest festivals of Mappangolo Datu Ase, Mappadendang, Manre Sipulung, Maccerak Ase and Maccerak Rakkapeng acted as a thanksgiving and celebratory gesture for the abundance of harvest obtained. Meanwhile, in the coastal and lakeside communities where fishery industry is regarded to be in the utmost importance, they would commemorate with Maccera Tappareng and Maccerak Tasik. However, with the rise of various socioeconomic and educational revolution, together with mass industrialization and the introduction of modern farming and fishing techniques throughout the 19th and 20th century, the collective impact of these festivals began to waned in favor of a much aligned practice with Islamic understanding among the mainstream Bugis society. Despite so, such regional celebration offered a brief outlook on the past, on a traditional ancient religion of a once agrarian community.

=== Musical traditions and performing arts ===
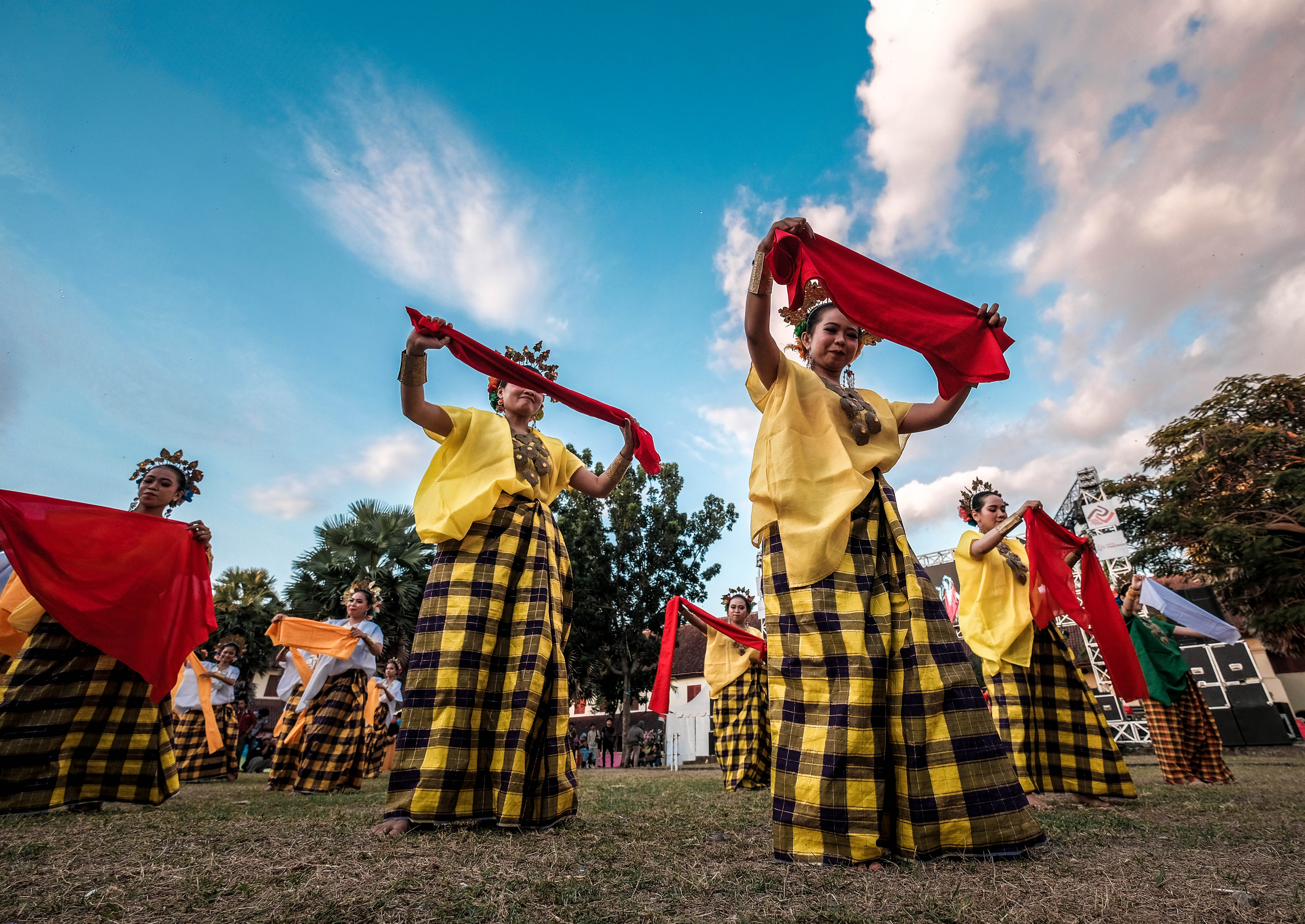
A South Sulawesi dance performance

Music and dance has long occupied an integral part of the people in the South Sulawesi. It is considered as an ancient art form, pictured as a dramatic and complex encapsulation of the heritage. The Bugis performing arts can be broadly divided into four distinct categories — entertainment medium, ritualistic performance, court dance and martial arts.

In the Bugis culture, choreography is regarded as a form of folkloric entertainment. It has enjoyed a long creative industry and maintained a close relationship with the people. It is usually presented during the communal occasions and used as a celebratory expression to commemorate significant events. The best known Bugis dance genre are Pajaga, and the more lively Pajogek — combining the elements of Ronggeng, Jaipong and accompanied by a pair of gendeng (drum). Other type of dances include Jeppeng, having a fusion of stronger Islamic elements; and Tari Paduppa, a traditional welcome dance.

In the past, the performing arts played an extensive role on the Bugis ritualistic function and observance. During such magico-religious ceremonies, esoteric energy were present and ancient dance techniques were accomplished by a Bugis shaman, known as Bissu. The depiction was characterized by a combination of spiritual aura and artistic elements to achieve a high level of possession-trance. The practice of possession used to be conducted by a Bissu during a vital cultural rite, such as to commemorate the beginning of the mappalili (paddy growing season) or during the important royal functions. Among the well-known ritualistic Bugis performance includes Tari Maggiri, Tari Alusu and Maddewata.

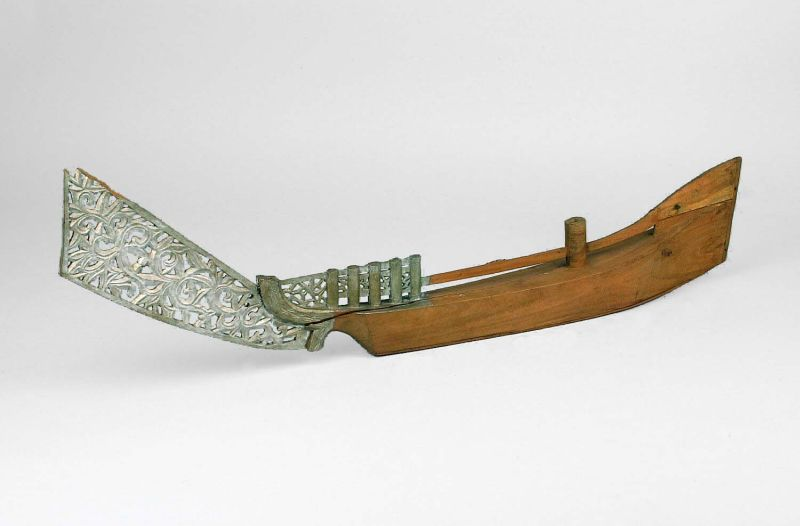
Kecapi Bugis, one of the traditional musical instruments for songs and storytelling

Martial art also serves as an outlook that mirrors the symbolic ideals of its strong militaristic tradition — courage, power, heroism, prestige, strength and preparation for war. Elements of martial skills were largely drawn from the local fighting culture and being incorporated in a repertoire of Bugis performing arts, such as in Manunencak/Mencak Baruga (Bugis Pencak Silat), Mallanca and Masempek. A close parallel can equally be observed in the Bugis war dance. The combatant qualities were emulated to commemorate the fortitude and spirit of the military class. The Bugis war dance of Penjaga Welado, Pajaga Gilireng and Pajaga Mutaro extensively captures such rendition.

Historically enjoyed a royal patronage, the Bugis court ballet consist of a juxtaposed movement of fast and slow; and a contrast between passive and active, such adaptation can be seen in the Bugis courtly portrayal in Pajaga Boneballa Anakdara, Pajaga Lelengbata Tulolo and Pajaga Lili. The artistic styles constitute the essence of Bugis aesthetic impulses — involving various movements, gestures, poise, balance and music. Historically among the members of Bugis nobility, dance was perceived as a social importance to develop and mold an individual's personal qualities on kedo (mannerism) and ampe (speech) according to the royal standards and etiquettes.

The Bugis also hosted a multitude of classical instruments, including Soling, flutes; Kacapi and Talindo, string musical instruments; Jalappa/Kancing-Kancing, a traditional cymbal; Aloso/Laluso, a Bugis percussion instrument, similar to Shekere; Gesok–Gesok/Keso–Keso, a Bugis-styled Rebab; Gendrang (not to be mistaken with Makassarese "Ganrang"), a two-headed drum; and Puik Puik/Pui-Pui, a classical trumpet. As with many Sulawesian musical traditions, the Gendrang occupied a prominent and sacred role in Bugis musical traditions forming the base of many accompaniments, although somewhat less revered compared with the Makassarese. In recent years, Makassarese Ganrang traditions have eroded the education of Bugis Gendrang, although sharing many similarities, such as using multiples drums with different patterns to create syncopation.

The Bugis art of dance was predominantly being inherited via an oral tradition from one generation to another. To some extent, each of the artforms serves as an episode to the past and navigated as a kaleidoscopic narration on the complex development of their intricate ethnic identity — from the once prevalent ancient ancestral beliefs led by a Bissu; the royal court and military traditions during the classical era; the extensive bilateral cultural exchange with the Makassarese; and the subsequent Islamisation of the mainstream Bugis society.

== See also ==
- Bugis in Malaysia, the Bugis diaspora in Malaysia
- Bugis in Singapore, the Bugis diaspora in Singapore
- Differences between the Bugis and Makassar people
- Gender in Bugis society, the gender interpretation amongst the classical and pre-Islamic Bugis society
- List of Bugis people, a list of notable people of Bugis descent
- The Bugis
- Austronesian expansion

== Bibliography ==
- Pelras, Christian (1996), The Bugis, Backwell Publishing, ISBN 978-0-631-17231-4
- Druce, Stephen; et al. (2005), A transitional Islamic Bugis cremation in Bulubangi, South Sulawesi: its historical and archaeological context, RIMA: Review of Indonesian and Malaysian Affairs
- Druce, Stephen (2009), The Lands West of the Lakes, Brill, ISBN 978-90-04-25382-7
- Ricklefs, Merle Calvin (2005), Sejarah Indonesia Modern (1200-2004) (PDF) (in Indonesian), Jakarta: PT Serambi Ilmu Semesta, ISBN 979-16-0012-0
- Julianti L. Parani (2015), Perantauan orang Bugis abad ke-18 (in Indonesian), Jakarta: Arsip Nasional RI
- Hall, D.G.E (1981), History of South East Asia, Jakarta: Red Globe Press, ISBN 978-0-333-24164-6
- Nurnaningsih (2015), Rekonstruksi Falsafah Bugis dalam Pembinaan Karakter: Kajian Naskah Paaseng Toriolo Tellumpoccoe (in Indonesian), vol. 13, Indonesia: Jurnal Lektur Keagamaan, p. 393
- Abdul Azis; et al. (2020), Inculcating Siri' Na Pacce Value in Primary School Learning (PDF), Mimbar Sekolah Dasar
- Murni Mahmud (2010), Language Change in Bugis Society: to be polite or to be maju (PDF), Linguistik Indonesia
- Friberg, Timothy (1984), A Dialect Geography of Bugis (PDF)
- Frawley, William J. (2003), International Encyclopedia of Linguistics, Oxford University Press, ISBN 978-0-19-505196-4
- Tryon, Darrell T. (1995), Comparative Austronesian Dictionary: An Introduction to Austronesian Studies, Linguistic Society of America
- Valls, David (2014), A Grammar sketch of the Bugis Language.
- Atlas of Endangered Languages, 28 November 2018
- Sejarah Baju Bodo (in Indonesian), 2019
- Ros Mahwati Ahmad Zakaria (2019), Baju Bodo Akulturasi Budaya, Warisan Bugis (PDF) (in Malay), Utusan
- Resti (2021), Baju Bodo Sulawesi Selatan, Pakaian Adat Tertua di Dunia (in Indonesian), Dailysia.com
- Eva Yanuarti (3 February 2021), Kain Sarung Bugis: Sejarah – Motif dan Cara Perawatannya (in Indonesian), haloedukasi.com
- Aristy Claudia (2021), Melirik Indahnya Kain Tenun Sutra Bugis (in Indonesian), farahid.com
- Museum Daerah Maros, 2020
- Surya Karmila Sari (2015), Pakaian Adat Suku Bugis (in Indonesian)
- Sejarah Sarung Orang Melayu Mingankabau Makasar Bugis (in Indonesian), 2017
- Muhlis Hadrawi (2020), Intergrasi Melayu di Sulawesi Selatan: Kajian Berdasarkan Lontara (in Indonesian), Perpustakaan Nasional Republik Indonesia, ISBN 978-623-313-053-0
- Umrahwati (2018), Kebiasaan Makanan Khas Suku Bone di Sulawesi Selatan (Makanan Khas Burasa') (in Indonesian)
- Husain, B.; et al. (2020), Sailing to the Island of the Gods': Bugis Migration in Bali Island (PDF), Utopía y Praxis Latinoamericana
- Ho, Stephanie (2013), Bugis community, National Library Singapore
- Nabila Qibtiya (2019), Suguhan Kuliner Tradisioinal Bugis (PDF) (in Indonesian)
- Uli Wahyuliana (2017), Berburu Kuliner Lebaran di Tanah Bugis (in Indonesian), Kompasiana
- Syarif; et al. (2017), "Sulapa Eppa As The Basic or Fundamental Philosophy of Traditional Architecture Buginese", SHS Web of Conferences, 41: 04005, doi:10.1051/shsconf/20184104005
- Mustamin Rahim; et al. (2021), "Characteristics of Buginese Traditional Houses and their Response to Sustainability and Pandemics" (PDF), E3S Web of Conferences, 328 10015, Bibcode:2021E3SWC.32810015R, doi:10.1051/e3sconf/202132810015, S2CID 244938941
- Pelras, Christian (2016), Orality and writing among the Bugis (PDF), Penerbit USM
- Macknight, Campbell (2016), "The Media of Bugis Literacy: A Coda to Pelras", International Journal of Asia Pacific Studies, 12, International Journal of Asia-Pacific Studies: 53–72, doi:10.21315/ijaps2016.12.s1.4
- Druce, Stephen C. (2016), Orality, writing and history: The literature of the Bugis and Makasar of South Sulawesi, vol. 12
- Halilintar Lathief; et al. (1999), Tari Daerah Bugis (PDF) (in Indonesian), Pustaka Wisata Budaya
- Hidayat Alsair (2019), "Sarat Nilai Lokal, Ini Tiga Tradisi Iduladha di Sulawesi Selatan", IDN Times Sulsel (in Indonesian)
- Ona Mariani (2021), Tradisi Ma'burasa dan Ma'tumbu Jelang Hari Raya (in Indonesian), Read Times
- Mulyadi Ma'ruf (2018), Filosofi Beli Alat Dapur di 10 Muharram Tradisi Bugis Makassar (in Indonesian), Pijar News
- Representasi Badik sebagai simbol kearifan lokal Bugis-Makassar (in Indonesian), Kumparan Travel, 2020
- Muslimin (2018), Sejarah Keris Bugis dan Perjalanan Panjangnya ke Pangkuan Ibu Pertiwi (in Indonesian), Uin Alauddin Makassar
- Senjata Tradisional Sulawesi Selatan, Ini 8 Alat Khas Suku Bugis (in Indonesian), Kumparan, 2021
- Mengenal Senjata Tradisional Sulawesi Selatan, Ada Kawali hingga Tappi (in Indonesian), Makassar Tribunnews, 2021
- Guru Dafa (2022), Alat Musik Tradisional Bugis (in Indonesian), RumusSoal.com
- Lamima (2020), Phinisi: A symbol of Indonesia's seafaring traditions, Lamima.com
- Munsi Lampe (2014), Tradisi pelayaran pelaut Bugis-Makassar dan reproduksi wawasan geo-sosio-budaya maritim Nusantara dan global (in Indonesian), Munsi Lampe, archived from the original on 8 April 2022
- Mellefont, Jeffrey (2018), Pinisi and the art of boatbuilding in Sulawesi recognised by UNESCO, Australia National Maritime Museum
- Tradisi rantau masyarakat Bugis Makassar (in Indonesian), Kompasiana, 2010
- Rahmatia; et al. (2020), "Eco-phenomenology in the local concept of Buginese agriculture based on Kutika manuscript", E3S Web of Conferences, 211, Universitas Indonesia: 01008, Bibcode:2020E3SWC.21101008R, doi:10.1051/e3sconf/202021101008, S2CID 229647743
- Nani Somba; et al. (2019), Mistifikasi ritual sistem pertanian tradisional masyarakat Ajatappareng, Sulawesi Selatan (in Indonesian), vol. 17, Jurnal Walennae, p. 19
- Pada 2025, luas panen padi diperkirakan sebesar 1,04 juta hektare dengan produksi padi sekitar 5,40 juta ton gabah kering giling (GKG). (in Indonesian), sulselprov.go.id, 2021
- Lineton, Jacqueline (1975), "Pasompe' Ugi': Bugis Migrants and Wanderers", Archipel, 10, Archipel10: 173–201, doi:10.3406/arch.1975.1248
- Hasbi; et al. (2021), Sappo: Sulapa Eppa Walasuji as the Ideas of Creation Three Dimensional Painting, Dewa Ruci: Jurnal Pengkajian dan Penciptaan Seni
- Nur Azizah (2017), Realitas Pertukaran Sosial Masyarakat Duri pada Hari Pasar di Baraka Kabupaten Enrekang, Universitas Muhammadiyah Makassar
- Bigalke, Terance W. (2005), Tana Toraja: A Social History of an Indonesian People, Singapore: Singapore University Press, ISBN 9971-69-313-5
