= Languages of Sulawesi =

Map showing the distribution of the languages of Sulawesi

On the Indonesian island of Sulawesi, 114 native languages are spoken, all of which belong to the Malayo-Polynesian subgroup of the Austronesian language family. With a total number of 20,800,000 inhabitants (2024 estimate, based on census data from 2020), Sulawesi displays a high linguistic diversity when compared with the most densely populated Indonesian island Java, which hosts 4–8 languages (depending on count) spoken by 156,000,000 inhabitants.

== Classification ==
All but three of the languages of Sulawesi belong to one of the following five subgroups, which are almost exclusively (Note: Only the South Sulawesi languages Embaloh and Taman, and the Sangiric language Sangil are located outside of Sulawesi.) spoken on Sulawesi:

- Gorontalo–Mongondow languages
- Sangiric languages
- Minahasan languages
- Celebic languages
- South Sulawesi languages

The remaining three languages are affiliated to subgroups which are primarily found outside of Sulawesi. Indonesian Bajau belongs to the Sama–Bajaw languages, and is spoken by scattered, traditionally nomadic coastal communities (locally known as Bajo people) which are distributed in many areas of eastern Indonesia. Makassar Malay and Manado Malay are Malay-based creoles.

The Gorontalo–Mongondow languages are part of the Greater Central Philippine languages, and thus more closely related to the languages of the central and southern Philippines than to other languages of Sulawesi. The Sangiric and Minahasan languages are included in the proposed Philippine subgroup, which also comprises the Greater Central Philippine languages and several other subgroups of the Philippines.

The Celebic and South Sulawesi languages are primary branches of Malayo-Polynesian.

== Language vitality ==
Some languages, like Buginese (five million speakers) and Makassarese (two million speakers), are widely distributed and vigorously used. Many of the languages with much smaller numbers of speakers are also still vigorously spoken, but some languages are almost extinct, because language use of the ethnic population has shifted to the dominant regional language, e.g. in the case of Ponosakan, with four remaining speakers.

== List of languages ==
=== Gorontalo–Mongondow languages ===
The Gorontalo–Mongondow languages are spoken in the provinces of Gorontalo, North Sulawesi and Central Sulawesi. The following internal classification is based on Sneddon & Usup (1986):

- Mongondowic: Mongondow, Ponosakan
- Gorontalic: Bintauna, Bolango, Buol, Gorontalo, Kaidipang, Lolak, Suwawa

=== Sangiric languages ===
The Sangiric languages are spoken in North Sulawesi, and in the southern Philippines on the Sarangani Islands off the southern coast of Mindanao. The following internal classification is based on Sneddon (1984):

- North Sangiric: Sangir, Talaud (Sangil – not spoken on Sulawesi)
- South Sangiric: Bantik, Ratahan

=== Minahasan languages ===
The Minahasan languages are spoken in North Sulawesi. The following internal classification is based on Sneddon (1978):

- Tonsawang
- North Minahasan: Tombulu, Tondano, Tonsea, Tontemboan

=== South Sulawesi languages ===
The South Sulawesi languages are mainly spoken in the provinces of South Sulawesi and West Sulawesi. Languages of the Tamanic branch are spoken outside of Sulawesi in West Kalimantan. The following internal classification is based on Friberg and Laskowske (1989):

- Lemolang
- Seko: Budong-Budong, Panasuan, Seko Padang, Seko Tengah
- Northern
  - Mamuju
  - Mandar
  - Massenrempulu: Duri, Enrekang, Maiwa, Malimpung
  - Pitu Ulunna Salu: Aralle-Tabulahan, Bambam, Dakka, Pannei, Ulumanda'
  - Toraja: Kalumpang, Mamasa, Tae', Talondo', Toraja-Sa'dan
- Bugis–Tamanic
  - Bugis: Buginese, Campalagian
  - (Tamanic: Embaloh, Taman – not spoken on Sulawesi)
- Makassaric: Bentong, Coastal Konjo, Highland Konjo, Makassarese, Selayar

=== Celebic languages ===
The Celebic languages are primarily spoken in Central Sulawesi and Southeast Sulawesi, and also in parts of South Sulawesi and West Sulawesi. The following internal classification is based on the Ethnologue:

- Tomini–Tolitoli languages
  - Tolitoli: Boano, Totoli
  - Tomini: Balaesang, Dampelas, Dondo, Lauje, Pendau, Taje, Tajio, Tomini
- Kaili–Pamona languages
  - Northern
    - Kaili: Baras, Da’a Kaili, Ledo Kaili, Unde Kaili, Lindu, Moma, Sedoa, Topoiyo
    - Pamona: Pamona, Tombelala
  - Southern
    - Badaic: Bada, Behoa, Napu
    - Rampi
    - Sarudu
    - Uma
- Wotu–Wolio languages
  - Wotu
  - Kalao–Laiyolo: Kalao, Laiyolo
  - Wolio–Kamaru: Kamaru, Wolio
- Eastern Celebic
  - Saluan–Banggai languages
    - Eastern: Balantak, Banggai,
    - Saluanic: Andio, Batui, Bobongko, Saluan
  - Southeastern Celebic
    - Bungku–Tolaki languages
      - Eastern
        - Moronene
        - East Coast: Bahonsuai, Bungku, Koroni, Kulisusu, Mori Bawah, Taloki, Wawonii
      - Western
        - Interior: Mori Atas, Padoe, Tomadino
        - West Coast: Kodeoha, Rahambuu, Tolaki, Waru
    - Muna–Buton languages
      - Tukang Besi–Bonerate: Bonerate, Tukang Besi North, Tukang Besi South
      - Nuclear Muna–Buton
        - Buton
          - East Buton: Kumbewaha, Lasalimu
          - Cia-Cia
        - Munan
          - Busoa
          - Munic
            - Kaimbulawa
            - Western: Kioko, Liabuku, Muna, Pancana

== See also ==
- Languages of Indonesia
