= List of languages by total number of speakers in Indonesia =

Full list of languages in Indonesia by total number of speakers, from Ethnologue 2015.

No	Languages	ISO 639	EGIDS	Population	Regions
1	Indonesian	ind	1	198,000,000	Widespread.
2	Javanese	jav	4	68,200,000	Banten, Central Java, and East Java provinces; Special Region of Yogyakarta; Sumatra island: Lampung province; resettlements in Kalimantan, Maluku, Papua, and Sulawesi.
3	Sunda	sun	5	32,400,000	Banten and West Java provinces: western third of Java; Central Java province: Cilacap regency.
4	Madura	mad	5	7,790,000	East Java province: Java island coast south and west of Surabaja city, Bawean, Kangean, and Sapudi islands; South Kalimantan province: Java Sea area.
5	Betawi	bew	6b	5,000,000	Banten province: Tangerang recency and city; dominant in Jakarta Special Capital Region; West Java province: Bekasi, Bogar, and Karawang regencies, also Bekasi and Depok cities.
6	Malay	zlm	6a	4,910,000	Aceh, Bangka Belitung Islands, Central Kalimantan, Jambi, North Sumatra, Riau, Riau Islands, South Kalimantan, West Kalimantan, and West Sumatra; widespread in central and north Sumatra, areas of Kalimantan, and island provinces between.
7	Minangkabau	min	5	4,880,000	Aceh province: Aceh Singkil regency, Pulau Banyak and Singkil districts; Simeulue regency, Sinabang; South Aceh regency; Southwest Aceh regency; West Aceh regency, Meureubo district (Aneuk Jamèe dialect); Bengkulu province: west coast Mukomuko area; South Sumatra province; West Sumatra province. Sumatra island, Indian Ocean coast, Padang is central area.
8	Bugis	bug	3	4,370,000	Central Sulawesi province: Donggola, Oti, and Toaya, west; 3 Tolo bay enclaves east; South Sulawesi province: widespread in peninsular interior (except south and east of Makassar city) east to Bone bay; Southeast Sulawesi province: Kasiputih area, 3 interior enclaves near Sulawesi Tenggara, Lake Towuti, Bone bay east coast; West Sulawesi province: More, Pasangkayu on Mandar bay; possibly in Kalimantan, Maluku, Papua, and Sumatra provinces.
9	Banjar	bjn	3	3,650,000	Central Kalimantan province: Palangkaraya, Pangkalanbun, and Sampit; East Kalimantan province: Kutai, Pasir, and Pulau Laut coastal regions, north toward Samarinda city and Mahakan delta; South Kalimantan province: Banjarmasin area; West Kalimantan province: some in coastal Matua; Kalimantan south and southeastern coasts, Java Sea and Makassar Strait.
10	Malay, Manado	xmm	3	3,320,000	Gorontalo and North Sulawesi provinces.
11	Bali	ban	5	3,300,000	Bali province: widespread; West Nusa Tenggara province: Kota Mataram and Lombok Barat regency; west central Lombok island.
12	Musi	mui	3	3,105,000	South Sumatera province: widespread in northern 2 thirds of province from Musi river upstream to Bukit Barisan mountains, downstream to coastal swamplands; Lampung province: northeast; border areas in Jambi and Bengkulu provinces.
13	Aceh	ace	6b	2,840,000	Aceh province: Aceh Barat, Aceh Barat Daya, Aceh Besar, Aceh Jaya, Aceh Selatan, Aceh Singkil, Aceh Tamiang, Aceh Timur, Aceh Utara, Bireuen, Kota Langsa, Kota Lhokseumawe, Nagan Raya, Pidie, and Pidie Jaya regencies, on Weh and neighboring islands; North Sumatra province: Tapanuli Tengah regency, south coast enclave.
14	Makasar	mak	6b	2,110,000	South Sulawesi province: Bantaeng, Gowa, Jeneponto, Maros, Pangkajene Dan Kepulauan, and Takalar regencies; southwest peninsula.
15	Sasak	sas	5	2,100,000	West Nusa Tenggara province: Lombok island.
16	Indonesian, Makassar	mfp	3	1,880,950	South Sulawesi province: Makassar port area.
17	Batak Toba	bbc	6b	1,610,000	North Sumatera province: Asahan, Humbang Hasundutan, Labuhan Batu Utara, Samosir, Simalungan, south Tapanuli Tengah, Tapanuli Utara, and Toba Samosir regencies; Samosir island; east, south, and west of Lake Toba.
18	Malay, Ambonese	abs	3	1,600,000	Maluku province: Kepulauan Aru regency, Aru island group, Wamar island; Seram Bagian Barat regency, Ambon city, Kamarian to Seriholu on Hoamoa peninsula; Maluku Tengah regency, Nusa Laut island, upper Elpaputih bay east to Sepa; Ceram sea coast from Karlutu east to Sawai.
19	Malay, Central	pse	6a	1,590,000	Bengkulu province: central Bukit Barisan highlands west to Indian Ocean along Bengkulu coast; Lampung province; South Sumatra province: Lematang and Ogan river valleys.
20	Malay, Papuan	pmy	3	1,100,000	Widespread in coastal areas of the Papuan provinces.
21	Malay, Jambi	jax	6a	1,000,000	Bengkulu province: small area south of Lake Dipatipan; Jambi province: widespread; Riau province: Indragiri Hulu and Indragiri Hilir regencies; South Sumatra province: northern border area; all on southeast West Sumatra province: Pessisir Selantan regency border enclave.
22	Malay, North Moluccan	max	3	1,000,000	North Maluku province: Halmahera Selatan regency, Damar, northwest Jaronga, and south Halmahera islands.
23	Manggarai	mqy	6a	900,000	East Nusa Tenggara province: Flores island, western third.
24	Ngaju	nij	3	890,000	Central Kalimantan province: Gunung Mas, Kapuas, Katingan, Kota Palangkaraya, Kotawaringin Timur, and Pulang Pisau regencies; headwaters of Kahayan, Kapuas, Katingan, and Mentaya rivers.
25	Nias	nia	5	867,000	North Sumatera province: Batu, Nias and Mursala islands. Alasa, Sirombu and Mandrehe (Northwest dialect); Gomo, and south in Teluk Dalam and Batu islands (Central dialect).
26	Lampung Api	ljp	6a	827,000	Bengkulu province: Kaur regency; Lampung province: Lampung Barat and Tanggamus regencies in Semangko bay area; Way Kanan, north Lampung, and Pringsewu regencies on Lampung bay east coast; also Sebuku, Sebesi, Tabuan, and Legundi islands; South Sumatra province: Ogan Komering Ulu, Ogan Komering Ulu Selatan, and Ogan Komering Ulu Timur regencies, near Kanan river headwaters.
27	Indonesian Sign Language	inl	6a	810,000	Scattered: Java and Bali, especially Jakarta.
28	Chinese, Min Nan	nan	8a	766,000	Bali, Java, Kalimantan, and Sumatra provinces: scattered.
29	Uab Meto	aoz	5	700,000	East Nusa Tenggara province: most of west Timor island.
30	Batak Mandailing	btm	6b	691,000	North Sumatera province: south interior from Padang Sidempuan into Riau and West Sumatra provinces.
31	Chinese, Hakka	hak	8a	640,000	Aceh, Bangka Belitung Islands, Banten, Central Java, East Java, West Java, South Kalimantan: Banjarmasin city; West Kalimantan: Singkawang city; Lampung, Maluku (Ambon island), Papua (Jayapura city), Riau Islands (Batam island), North Sulawesi, South Sulawesi, North Sumatra, South Sumatra; Yogyakarta province.
32	Toraja-Sa’dan	sda	5	588,000	South Sulawesi province: Luwu and Tana Toraja regencies; West Sulawesi province: Mamasa regency; possibly Makassar city, west coast.
33	Batak Angkola	akb	6b	535,000	North Sumatera province: Labuhan Batu, Labuhan Batu Selatan, Padang Lawas, Padang Lawas Utara, Tapanuli Selatan, Tapanuli Tengah, and Tapanuli Utara regencies; inland from Sibolga city area south, east to Binanga, northeast toward the Strait of Malacca.
34	Malayic Dayak	xdy	6a	520,000	Widely dispersed; Central Kalimantan province: Katingan, Kotawaringgin Barat, Koti Timur, Lamandau, and Sukamara regencies; West Kalimantan province: small area near Sintang, area near Putussibau, and Sandai area, all along Kapuas river; Ketapang city northeast towards Kotabaru. Sandai, Muarakayang, Pembuanghulu, Sukamara, and Sukaraja town areas (Kayung and Delang dialects); Sintang to Putus Sibau town areas (Semitau, Suhaid, and Mentebah-Suruk dialects); Singakawang, Bengkayang, Darit, and Sungairaya town areas (Banana’ and Tapitn dialects); Muarakayang, Pembuanghulu, Sandai, Sukamara, and Sukaraja town areas (Kayung and Delang dialects).
35	Gorontalo	gor	6b	505,000	Gorontalo province: widespread along both coasts; North Sulawesi province: Bolaang Mongondow Utara regency, northeast of Gorontalo city.
36	Bima	bhp	6a	500,000	East Nusa Tenggara province: Komodo island area; West Nusa Tenggara province: Sumbawa island, east of the isthmus, Banta and Sangeang islands.
37	Mandar	mdr	3	499,000	South Sulawesi province: Pangkajene Islands regency, Pabbring islands near Makassar city, other areas; West Sulawesi province: Majene, Mamuju, and Polewali Mandar regencies, Cape Mandar and Majene city, and 3 coastal enclaves north; coastal area between Parangkayu and Simajo towns.
38	Batak Karo	btx	6b	491,000	Aceh province: Aceh Tenggara regency, at the border; North Sumatra province: Dairi, Deli Serdang, Karo, and Langkat regencies; Tapanuli Tengah regency, south small border area.
39	Komering	kge	6a	470,000	South Sumatera province: Ogan Komering Ulu Selatan, Ogan Komering Ulu Timur, Ogan Komering Ulu, and Ogan Komering Ilir regencies; along Komering river from Ranaumeer to near Palembang city.
40	Chinese, Mandarin	cmn	6b	466,000	Scattered.
41	Tetun	tet	5	400,000	East Nusa Tenggara province: central Timor island.
42	Malay, Kupang	mkn	3	350,000	East Nusa Tenggara province: Kupang regency, Kupang city and Semau island; all on west Timor island.
43	Rejang	rej	6a	350,000	Bengkulu province: Arga Makmur, Curup, Kapahiang, and Muara Aman town areas in southwest highlands; South Sumatra province: Musi Rawas Ulu, west.
44	Bangka	mfb	6a	340,000	Bangka Belitung Islands province: widespread, Bangka island.
45	Kendayan	knx	3	321,000	West Kalimantan province: Bengkayang, Kota Singkawang, Kuba Raya, Landak, Sambas, and Sanggau regencies; northwest Kalimantan island, South China sea coast, and Madi and Papan jungle area.
46	Osing	osi	6a	300,000	East Java province: Banyuwangi regency area on far east Java island facing Bali strait.
47	Sumbawa	smw	6a	300,000	West Nusa Tenggara province: Sumbawa and Moyo islands.
48	Arabic, Levantine	apc	Unestablished	283,000	
49	Gayo	gay	6b	275,000	Aceh province: Central Aceh, East Aceh, Gayo Lues, and Southeast Aceh regencies; Sumatra highland region near Mount Sembuang.
50	Tae’	rob	5	272,000	South Sulawesi province: Luwu and North Luwu regencies; northwest coast; Bone bay; Bastem sub-district, Rongkong river valley. East Luwu regency, Nuha sub-district (Rongkong dialect).
51	Lamaholot	slp	3	268,000	East Nusa Tenggara province: Flores Timur regency; also Solor island; possibly north Pantar coast, northwest Alor, and surrounding islands.
52	Muna	mnb	6b	266,000	Southeast Sulawesi province: Buton regency, Kendari city; Central Buton, Muna, West-Muna, and South Buton regencies.
53	Kerinci	kvr	6b	260,000	Sumatra, Jambi province: Kerinci regency, Sungaipenuh area in western mountains; West Sumatra province: Solok Selatan regency.
54	Kambera	xbr	5	240,000	East Nusa Tenggara province: east Sumba island.
55	Tolaki	lbw	6b	238,000	Southeast Sulawesi province: Kolaka, North Kolaka, Konawe, North Konawe, and South Konawe regencies, Mekongga district; Point Kolono on southeast peninsula, northwest across plains to highlands; west coast, past Klaka town toward Bone bay narrows.
56	Bajau, Indonesian	bdl	6b	226,000	Gorontalo province; North Maluku province: Bacan, Kayoa, Obi, and Sula islands; Central Sulawesi, North Sulawesi, South Sulawesi, and Southeast Sulawesi provinces.
57	Kaili, Ledo	lew	3	215,000	Central Sulawesi province: south Donggala, Morowali, south Parigi Moutong, Poso, Sigi, and Tojo Una-Una regencies, Kota Palu city; Una-Una island in Togian chain, coastal groups near Malai, Puna, and Tomori bay head.
58	Malay, Tenggarong Kutai	vkt	6a	210,000	East Kalimantan province: Mahakam river basin east to Celebes Sea coast, north from Cape Pandan along coast south to Samarinda city area.
59	Chinese, Yue	yue	8a	182,000	Jakarta Special Capital Region, Kalimantan, and North Sumatra: scattered.
60	Dani, Western	dnw	6a	180,000	Papua province: Central highlands.
61	Lampung Nyo	abl	6a	180,000	Lampung province: 3 enclaves east between Kanan and Seputih rivers.
62	Sika	ski	6a	175,000	East Nusa Tenggara province: east Flores island.
63	Batak Dairi	btd	6b	172,000	Aceh province: Aceh Singkil regency; North Sumatra province: Dairi, Humbang Hasundutan, Pakpak Barat, Samosir, and Tapanuli Tengah regencies, Sidikalang town area south to coast.
64	Konjo, Coastal	kjc	6b	167,000	South Sulawesi province: Bantaeng, Bulukumba, and Sinjai regencies; southeast peninsula on Salayer strait.
65	Batak Simalungun	bts	5	151,000	North Sumatera province: Deli Serdang, Kota Pematang Siantar, Serdang Bedagai, and Simalungun regencies.
66	Ma’anyan	mhy	6b	150,000	Central Kalimantan province: Barito Selatan and Barito Timur regencies, Awang, Dusun Hilir, Dusun Selatan, Dusun Tengah, Dusun Utara, Gunung Bintang Awai, Karau Kuala, and Patangkep Tutui sub-districts, south Tamianglayang town area; South Kalimantan province: border area, and 2 areas near Damar and Tawahan.
67	Col	liw	6a	145,000	Bengkulu and South Sumatra provinces: Lubuklinggau and Muaraklingi areas south, east, and north; small group east of Bengkulu city.
68	Tukang Besi South	bhq	6a	130,000	South Sulawesi province: Selayar regency, Bonerate, Kalaotoa, Karompa, and Madu islands; Alor, Ambon, Buru, Maluku, Mongole, Seram, Sulawesi, and Taliabu islands; Southeast Sulawesi province: Tukang Besi archipelago, south islands, and northern Binongko and Tomea islands; Papua province: western areas.
69	Duri	mvp	6b	123,000	South Sulawesi province: north Enrekang regency; Makassar city and other communities.
70	Tukang Besi North	khc	6a	120,000	Southeast Sulawesi province: Ambon, Bacan, Buru, Kaledupa, Maluku, Mongole, Runduma, Seram, Sulabesi, Taliabu, and Wangiwangi islands; Baubau and Sumbawa cities.
71	Mongondow	mog	6b	117,000	North Sulawesi province: Bolaang Mongondow, Bolaang Mongondow Selatan, and Bolaang Mongondow Timur regencies; north peninsula, Nanasi town west to Bijaj river; south side, southwest of Ratatotok almost to Kombot town.
72	Ende	end	6a	110,000	East Nusa Tenggara province: south central Flores island.
73	Hawu	hvn	5	110,000	East Nusa Tenggara province: Flores island, Ende area; Raijua and Sawu islands, 3 enclaves; Sumba island, Waingapu and Melolo areas; Timor island, Kupang city.
74	Kangean	kkv	5	110,000	East Java province: sea coast; Kangean islands.
75	Sangir	sxn	5	110,000	North Sulawesi province: Great Sangir island east peninsula.
76	Li’o	ljl	6a	105,000	East Nusa Tenggara province: east central Flores island.
77	Cia-Cia	cia	6b	104,000	Southeast Sulawesi province: southeast tip, Flores sea; Buton island, inland between Sampolawa and Pasawajo towns; Batu Atas and Binongko islands.
78	Selayar	sly	6a	103,000	South Sulawesi province: Selayar island.
79	Batak Alas-Kluet	btz	6a	101,000	Aceh province: inland from Tapaktuan, and northwest towards Kutacane; into North Sumatra province.
80	Bakumpai	bkr	3	100,000	Central Kalimantan province: Barito Selatan, and Barito Utara, and Kapuas regencies, Kapuas and Barito rivers; possibly southernmost Murung Raya regency.
81	Ekari	ekg	5	100,000	Papua province: Deiya, Dogiyai, Intan Jaya, north Mimika, south Nabire, and Paniai regencies in west central highlands and Lake Paniai area; West Papua province: Kaimana regency south-southwest.
82	Lawangan	lbx	6a	100,000	Central Kalimantan province: North, East, and South Barito regencies; East Kalimantan province: Karau river area; South Kalimantan province: Balangan, Kotabaru, and Tabalong regencies.
83	Semandang	sdq	5	100,000	West Kalimantan province: Ketapang regency in Kualan and Semandang river areas.
84	Adonara	adr	6a	98,000	East Nusa Tenggara province: Adonara and east Solor islands.
85	Enrekang	ptt	6b	94,500	South Sulawesi province: Enrekang and Pinrang regencies, Enrekang town area, west toward Mandar bay head; West Sulawesi province: Polewali Mandar regency coastal area.
86	Hindi	hin	Unestablished	94,000	
87	Buol	blf	6a	90,200	Central Sulawesi province: Baolan, Biau, Bokat, Bunobogu, Momunu, and Paleleh sub-districts, 68 villages on north coast, near Gorontalo province border.
88	Mamasa	mqj	6a	89,100	South Sulawesi province: north Pare-Pare area; West Sulawesi province: Mamasa regency, along Mamasa river.
89	Banggai	bgz	7	88,300	Central Sulawesi province: Banggai Kepulauan regency, at least 157 villages; Banggai and Bowokan islands.
90	Tagalog	tgl	Unestablished	86,000	
91	Kei	kei	6a	85,000	Maluku province: about 207 villages on 10 islands southeast; Besar, Kecil, and surrounding islands, Kei island group, and Kur islands northwest of Kei group.
92	Malay, Kota Bangun Kutai	mqg	6a	80,000	East Kalimantan province: Lakes Semajang and Melintang areas, north along Belayen river and central Mahakam river basin.
93	Tengger	tes	6a	80,000	East Java province: south of Pasuran regency, near Mount Bromo.
94	Galela	gbi	5	79,000	North Maluku province: Halmahera Selatan regency, Bisa island, Koto Wonto area; Obi island: Laiwai and Sesepe area, and Woi Lower and Wui islands on south coast; Kasiratua, Mandioli, and Obit islands in Bacan islands group; Halmahera Utara regency, Galela bay, east of Galela town; Pulau Morotai regency, Rau and Morotai islands.
95	Ot Danum	otd	6a	78,800	Central Kalimantan province: upper south Kapuas river, 7 villages; East Kalimantan province: Kutai Barat regency; West Kalimantan province: Melawi river watershed.
96	Pamona	pmf	6b	77,900	Central Sulawesi province: Poso regency, Ampana Kota, Ampanatete, Bungku Tengah, Bungku Utara, Lage, Mori Atas, Pamona Selatan, Pamona Utara, Parigi, Petasia, Poso Kota, Poso Pesisir, Tojo, Ulubongko, and Una-Una sub-districts; South Sulawesi province: Luwu Utara district, Bone-Bone, Mangkutana, and north Wotu sub-districts. 193 villages.
97	Amarasi	aaz	5	70,000	East Nusa Tenggara province: Kupang regency, Timor island southwest tip; Timur sea near Benini point east to Ela point, interior as far north as Oesa town; 80 villages. Dialects: central and east (Kotos dialect), west (Ro’is dialect), south (Ro’is Tais Nonof dialect), Kota Kupang area (Ro’is Hero dialect).
98	Biak	bhw	6b	70,000	Papua province: Biak Numfor regency, Biak and Numfor islands; Yapen Island regency, north coast area; West Papua province: Mapia islands; Raja Ampat regency, Bantanta and south Waigeo islands; numerous island communities, east, north, and west of Bird's Head.
99	Konjo, Highland	kjk	6b	68,500	South Sulawesi province: Bone, Bulukumba, Gowa, and Sinjai regencies, south peninsula interior; Mount Lompobatang area northwest, past Makassar city.
100	Wolio	wlo	6b	65,000	Southeast Sulawesi province: Buton regency, Bau-Bau city on Buton island southwest coast.
101	Mamuju	mqx	6b	62,900	West Sulawesi province: Mamuju regency, Budong-Budong, Kalukku, and Mamuju sub-districts; Point Rangas north along Makassar strait coast to Limba town area.
102	Kaili, Da’a	kzf	5	62,600	Central Sulawesi and West Sulawesi provinces: Banawa, Dolo, Marawola, Palolo, and Sigi-Biromaru sub-districts.
103	Mentawai	mwv	5	62,300	West Sumatera province: Sumatra island; Mentawai islands, across from Padang city.
104	Ternate	tft	6b	62,000	North Maluku province: Kota Ternate regency, Hiri and Ternate islands; Halmahera Selatan regency, islands between Bacan and Kasiruta islands; Halmahera island southeast of Gane bay; Damar and Yoronga islands.
105	Ngad’a	nxg	6a	60,000	East Nusa Tenggara province: south central Flores island.
106	Siang	sya	6a	60,000	Central Kalimantan province: Murung Raya regency, Barito river north along tributary.
107	Malay, Bukit	bvu	6a	59,000	South Kalimantan province: Sampanahan river area northwest of Limbungan town.
108	Wejewa	wew	6a	55,000	East Nusa Tenggara province: west Sumba island interior.
109	Benyadu’	byd	6a	54,000	West Kalimantan province: Bengkayang and Landak regencies; near Sarawak border.
110	Talaud	tld	6a	53,100	North Sulawesi province: Talaud islands.
111	Saluan	loe	6b	51,900	Central Sulawesi province: Banggai regency, Balingara town east to Mount Balantak area; Lamala bay southwest along Peleng strait to Mantawa town, inland to central highlands; Tojo Una-Una regency, Togian islands, Walbabhi island: Batui, Boalemo, Bunta, Kintom, Luwuk, East Luwuk, Nuhon, and Pagimana sub-districts, 136 villages.
112	Dani, Mid Grand Valley	dnt	5	50,000	Papua province: Lanny Jaya and Ndugu regencies, Baliem Grand Valley central highlands.
113	Fordata	frd	6b	50,000	Maluku province: southeast, 30 villages; north archipelago on Fordata, Larat, and Molu-Maru islands; northwest, Yamdena island west coast, Seira island; also Jakarta, other cities.
114	Nage	nxe	5	50,000	East Nusa Tenggara province: central Flores island, west slopes of Ebu Lobo volcano.
115	Tunjung	tjg	6b	50,000	Central Kalimantan province: North Barito regency border area; East Kalimantan province: Kutai Barat and Kutai Kartanegara regencies between Adas, Dempar, and Melak towns, then down Mahakam river, east around Djempang lake.
116	Lauje	law	6b	49,800	Central Sulawesi province: Donggala and Parigi Moutong regencies, Ampibabo, Dampelas Sojol, Dondo, Tinombo, and Tomini sub-districts in Sidoan river area.
117	Tidore	tvo	6a	46,000	North Maluku province: Tidore, Mare, and Moti islands; Halmahera island west coast areas.
118	Buru	mhs	6b	45,000	Maluku province: Buru island except northeast corner, 70 villages; some on Ambon island in Jakarta.
119	Ribun	rir	6a	45,000	West Kalimantan province: Kapuas Hulu regency, Tayan Hulu sub-district, Landak river area.
120	Sanggau	scg	6a	45,000	West Kalimantan province: Sanggau regency along Kapuas river.
121	Bambam	ptu	5	42,100	West Sulawesi province: Mamasa regency, Mambi sub-district, Maloso and Mapilli rivers watershed; into Majene and Mamuju regencies.
122	Simeulue	smr	6a	40,300	Aceh province: east and west Simeulue island; Babi and Banyak islands.
123	Kaur	vkk	6a	40,000	Bengkulu province: south; South Sumatra province: northwest from Danay Panay; all on Sumatra island.
124	Ke’o	xxk	6a	40,000	East Nusa Tenggara province: 4 villages on south central Flores island.
125	Mualang	mtd	5	40,000	West Kalimantan province: Belitang, Belitang Hilir, and Belitang Hulu Sekadau sub-districts along Ayak and Belitang rivers.
126	Jangkang	djo	6a	37,000	West Kalimantan province: central Sanggau regency, between Sanggau and Balai Sebut towns on Kapuas river tributary.
127	Seberuang	sbx	6a	37,000	West Kalimantan province: Kapuas river area from Nanga Silat town to Selimbau town, on Belimbing, Lebang, Belitang, Seauk, Tempunak, Selimbau, and Silat rivers.
128	Geser-Gorom	ges	6a	36,500	Maluku province: Seram island southeast.
129	Kaili, Unde	unz	6a	35,700	Central Sulawesi province: Banawa, Palu, and Tawaeli sub-districts; Palu bay west to Makassar strait; West Sulawesi province: Pasangkayu sub-district.
130	English	eng	Unestablished	34,000	Large cities in Java; other industrial areas.
131	Kulisusu	vkl	6a	32,100	Southeast Sulawesi province: North Buton regency, Bonegunu, Kulisusu Barat, Kulisusu Induk, and Kulisusu Utara sub-districts on north Buton island.
132	Keninjal	knl	6a	32,000	Central Kalimantan province; West Kalimantan province: Gelalak, Nangaella, Nangapinoh, and Nangasayan town areas, and along Melawi and Sayan rivers.
133	Ulumanda’	ulm	6b	31,600	West Sulawesi province: Majene, Mamuju, and Polewali-Mandar regencies, mostly interior.
134	Maiwa	wmm	6b	31,500	South Sulawesi province: Enrekang, Polewali Mandar and Sidenrang-Rappang regencies; Boya river area.
135	Ampanang	apg	6a	30,000	East Kalimantan province: east of Jambu and Lamper towns west of Mahakam river delta.
136	Bulungan	blj	6a	30,000	East Kalimantan province: Tanjungselor town area, lower Kayan river.
137	Kedang	ksx	6a	30,000	East Nusa Tenggara province: northeast Lembata island.
138	Pekal	pel	6a	30,000	South Sumatera and Bengkulu provinces: northeast of Ipuh town to Tembesi river, to Argamakmur area south.
139	Sentani	set	5	30,000	Papua province: Lake Sentani area, about 30 scattered villages; scattered in other parts of Indonesia.
140	Taman	tmn	6a	30,000	West Kalimantan province: Kapuas Hulu regency; upper Kapuas river.
141	Termanu	twu	6a	30,000	East Nusa Tenggara province: Bokai, Keka, Korbafo, Talae, and Termanu areas on central Rote island.
142	Aralle-Tabulahan	atq	5	29,300	West Sulawesi province: Mamasa regency, Mambi sub-district, Aralle and Tabulalang towns, 2 separate areas.
143	Tobelo	tlb	5	27,700	North Maluku province: Kao, Jailolo, and Tubelo districts on north Halmahera island; Maba and Wasile districts on central Halmahera; Morotai island central east coast; Ambon, Bacan, Gane, Obi, Patani, Raja Ampat, and Weda islands; Papua province: Sorong area.
144	Wawonii	wow	6b	27,600	Southeast Sulawesi province: Wawonii and Menui islands near Kendari port.
145	Tidung, Southern	itd	6a	27,000	North Kalimantan province: Atap, Malinau, Mensalong, Nunukan, Pembeliangan, Tarakan, and Tideng Pale towns.
146	Moronene	mqn	6b	26,300	Southeast Sulawesi province: Bombana regency, Bombana district, Wita Ea village; Rumbia mountains on southeast mainland; Kabaena island, Tokotu’a village; mainland opposite Kabaena. Rumbia, Poleang, and Poleang Timur sub-districts (Wita Ea dialect).
147	Alor	aol	6a	25,000	East Nusa Tenggara province: coastal Bird's Head of Alor, north Pantar and adjacent islands.
148	Lamboya	lmy	6a	25,000	East Nusa Tenggara province: Sumba island southwest coast.
149	Malay, Balinese	mhp	6b	25,000	Bali province: widespread on Bali and Nusa islands.
150	Yamdena	jmd	5	25,000	Maluku province: Tannembar islands, east coast Yamdena island, south to north tip of Selaru island, 35 villages; southwest Yamdena island, Latdalam village.
151	Pannei	pnc	6b	24,400	West Sulawesi province: Polewali Mandar regency, Wonomulyo sub-district.
152	Lundayeh	lnd	5	23,000	North Kalimantan province: mountainous Sesayap river area.
153	Korean	kor	Unestablished	22,800	
154	Bungku	bkz	6b	22,000	Central Sulawesi province: Bungku Selatan, Bungku Tengah, and Bungku Utara sub-districts, about 45 coastal villages from Mondeodo south to Kendari area; Southeast Sulawesi province: Konawe regency, Asera, Soropia, and Lasolo sub-districts, Tulambatu and Kenduri areas inland, interior enclave southeast of Lake Poso.
155	Bunak	bfn	6a	21,000	East Nusa Tenggara province: Belu regency, central interior, near East Timor border, on Timor island.
156	Tonsawang	tnw	7	21,000	North Sulawesi province: Minahasa Tenggara regency; north area near Ronoketang town.
157	Balantak	blz	5	20,500	Central Sulawesi province: Banggai regency, Balantak, Lamala, Luwuk, and Tinangkung Lamala sub-districts, at least 49 villages; Cape Talabu.
158	Badui	bac	6a	20,000	Banten province: Rangkasbitung regency, Pandeglang town, on Ujung river; West Java province: Sukabumi city area, 1 village, and Cikajang city area.
159	Dani, Lower Grand Valley	dni	5	20,000	Papua province: Ndugu regency, Baliem Grand Valley central highlands; lower gorge.
160	Dani, Upper Grand Valley	dna	5	20,000	Papua province: Lanny Jaya regency, Baliem Grand Valley central highlands; upper gorge.
161	Dengka	dnk	6a	20,000	East Nusa Tenggara province: Rote island northwest coast, Ba’a town west to Tasilo bay.
162	Dusun Deyah	dun	6a	20,000	South Kalimantan province: Tabalong river northeast of Bongkang town; into Central Kalimantan province.
163	Indonesian, Peranakan	pea	7	20,000	Central Java, East Java, West Java, and Yogyakarta provinces scattered on north coast.
164	Kisar	kje	5	20,000	Maluku province: south, over 20 villages; Kisar island, northeast of Timor island, 19 villages; Roma and Wetar islands, Amau, Hila, Hi’ai, Likagraha, and Naumatan villages; some in Ambon, Dili, and Kupang cities.
165	Kodi	kod	5	20,000	East Nusa Tenggara province: west Sumba.
166	Lole	llg	6a	20,000	East Nusa Tenggara province: west central Rote island, Ba’a town and north to south coast; north and central region (North Lole dialect).
167	Mai Brat	ayz	5	20,000	West Papua province: about 40 villages in central Bird's Head, Ayamaru lakes area.
168	Makian, East	mky	6b	20,000	North Maluku province: Kota Tidore Kepaluan regency; Bacan, Halmahera west coast, Kayoa, south Mori, and Obi islands.
169	Malay, Larantuka	lrt	6b	20,000	East Nusa Tenggara province: Flores Timur regency, Larantuka city area, and southwest Flores Strait towards Lewotobi town.
170	Mandobo Bawah	bwp	6b	20,000	Papua province: Boven Digul regency, Aiwat, Anggai, Butiptiri, Getentiri, Kaisah, and Subur villages; south of Tanahmerah and Mindiptanah towns, to Fly river on Papua New Guinea border.
171	Moni	mnz	5	20,000	Papua province: central highlands, northeast Lake Paniai area.
172	Sula	szn	6a	20,000	North Maluku province: Sula islands; Sula Besi (Sanana) island, widespread; Mangole island scattered on east, west and north coasts; Buru island northeast coast.
173	Tawoyan	twy	5	20,000	Central Kalimantan province: Palori town area; East Kalimantan province: southeast border area.
174	Tii	txq	6a	20,000	East Nusa Tenggara province: southwest Rote island.
175	Walak	wlw	6a	20,000	Papua province: Jayawijaya regency, Asologoima, Biri, Bolakme, Bugi, Koragi, Ngguma (Tagima), Pyramid, Silo Karno, Wolo, and Yalengga districts; Mamberamo Tengah Regency, Eragiam, Ilugwa, Mogonik, Winam, and Wurigelebur districts.
176	Sikule	skh	6b	19,800	Aceh province: central Simeulue island.
177	Tomini	txm	6b	19,700	Central Sulawesi province: Parigi Moutong and Toli-Toli regencies; Gorontalo province: Pohuwato regency, east to Mautang area. 42 villages.
178	Bahau	bhv	6a	19,000	East Kalimantan province: Kutai Barat regency, Long Apari, Long Bagun, and Long Hubung, and Long Pahangai sub-districts; Ratah and Mahakam rivers’ confluence area.
179	Tombulu	tom	7	19,000	North Sulawesi province: Minahasa regency, Kota Tomohon city.
180	Uma	ppk	5	18,800	Central Sulawesi province: Sigi regency, South Kulawi and Pipikoro sub-districts, 32 villages on Lariang river and tributaries; South Sulawesi province: north Luwu regency, enclave within Seko Padang [skx] language area; south Pasangkayu regency, Mamuju sub-district; West Sulawesi province: Lariang river west bank area.
181	Haruku	hrk	8a	18,200	Maluku province: Haruku island, Lease islands.
182	Kalumpang	kli	6a	18,000	South Sulawesi province; West Sulawesi province: southeast Mamuju regency, Kalumpang sub-district, Karama river headwaters.
183	Luang	lex	5	18,000	Maluku province: Wetan island, and across Wetan strait to northwest Babar island.
184	Haji	hji	6a	17,500	South Sumatera province: Ogan Komering Ulu Selatan regency, 2 areas on Sumatra.
185	Alune	alp	6b	17,200	Maluku province: Seram Bagian Barat regency, Kairatu and Taniwel districts, 27 villages in Latuhelu area and Piru bay.
186	Dutch	nld	Unestablished	17,000	
187	Sou Nama	tlt	6a	17,000	Maluku province: south Seram island, Teluti bay area.
188	Abui	abz	6a	16,000	East Nusa Tenggara province: west Alor island.
189	Anakalangu	akg	6a	16,000	East Nusa Tenggara province: Sumba island, southwest coast.
190	Hatam	had	5	16,000	West Papua province: Manokwari regency.
191	Hitu	htu	6b	16,000	Maluku province: Maluku Tengah regency, Hila, Hitu, Mamala, Morela, and Wakal villages on Ambon island, Piru Sea coast, Hitu peninsula.
192	Nalca	nlc	5	16,000	Papua province: east highlands north slopes.
193	Modang	mxd	6a	15,300	East Kalimantan province: 5 enclaves on upper reaches of Belayan, Kelinjau, Mahakam, and Segah rivers.
194	Basap	bdb	6b	15,000	East Kalimantan and North Kalimantan provinces: Berau, Bulungan, Kutai Kartanegara, Penajam Paser Utara, and Kutai Timur regencies, scattered.
195	Duano	dup	6a	15,000	Sumatra, Riau province: west archipelago and Daratan east coast; into Jambi province: northeast coast; Riau Province, Bengkalis, Kepulauan Meranti, and Pelawan regencies, offshore islands Rangsang, Mendol, and Bengkalis, 4 areas.
196	Iban	iba	5	15,000	West Kalimantan province: Kapuas Hulu regency, Nanga Katungau north to Sarawak border on middle Kapuas river, east of Mount Betung to Udjungumbut, west to Sebangkung town; Sintang regency, lower Kapuas south bank.
197	Ile Ape	ila	6b	15,000	East Nusa Tenggara province: Lembata regency, north Lomblem island, Ile Ape peninsula and inland.
198	Loloda	loa	5	15,000	North Maluku province: North Halmahera regency on northwest coast, nearby islands.
199	Tabaru	tby	5	15,000	North Maluku province: West Halmahera regency, Ibu, Jailolo, and Oba sub-districts.
200	Yali, Angguruk	yli	5	15,000	Papua province: central highlands area.
201	Tontemboan	tnt	6b	14,900	North Sulawesi province: Minahasa Selatan regency on Amurang bay inland; Minahasa and Minahasa Tenggara regencies, Lake Tondano southeast strip to coast.
202	Meyah	mej	5	14,800	West Papua province: Bird's Head northeast coast.
203	Damal	uhn	6b	14,000	Papua province: central highlands, Paniai regency, Beoga and Ilaga sub-districts; Asmat, Deiya, Mimika, and Puncak regencies, north and south Carstens mountains; possibly Lanny Jaya and Nduga regencies.
204	Helong	heg	6b	14,000	East Nusa Tenggara province: Semau island; Timor island west tip, and Kupang city.
205	Japanese	jpn	Unestablished	14,000	
206	Mori Atas	mzq	6b	14,000	Central Sulawesi province: Lembo, Mori Atas, and Petasia sub-districts, 25 villages on southeast peninsula neck; South Sulawesi province: Nuha sub-district.
207	Mori Bawah	xmz	6b	14,000	Central Sulawesi province: Bungku Tengah, Lembo, and Petasia sub-districts, 24 villages; South Sulawesi province: Mahalone and Matano lakes. All locations are on southeast Sulawesi island peninsula, Lake Towuti area.
208	Riung	riu	6a	14,000	East Nusa Tenggara province: north central Flores island, Kabupaten Ngada and Kecamatan Riung.
209	Larike-Wakasihu	alo	6b	12,600	Maluku province: Maluku Tengah regency, Allang, Lai, Larike, Tapi, and Wakasihu villages on southwest Ambon island coast, Hitu peninsula.
210	Bakati’, Rara	lra	5	12,000	West Kalimantan province: Bengkayang regency, Pejampi and 2 other villages; Sanggau regency border area; upper Lundu and Sambas rivers.
211	Kenyah, Mainstream	xkl	6b	12,000	East Kalimantan and North Kalimantan provinces: Batu Kajang, Long Belua, Long Setulang, Long Uli, and Pimping villages; Djempang area enclave, Melintang, and Semajang; on Bahau, upper Balui, upper Baram, Belayan, Kayan, Kelai, Mahakam, Malinau, Segah, and Telen rivers.
212	Makian, West	mqs	6a	12,000	North Maluku province: Halmahera southwest coast, Kayoa, west Makian islands.
213	Rikou	rgu	6a	12,000	East Nusa Tenggara province: East Rote island, Landu, Oe Pao, and Rikou areas.
214	Sawai	szw	6b	12,000	North Maluku province: Halmahera Tengah and Halmahera Selatan regencies, Gane Timur and Weda districts;13 villages. Halmahera island, southeast peninsula, Weda bay, both coasts: 13 villages.
215	Sougb	mnx	5	12,000	West Papua province: about 50 villages in Bird's Head area, southeast from Anggi lakes to Momi town on northwest Cenderawasih bay.
216	Tausug	tsg	5	12,000	North Kalimantan province: scattered coastal settlements; immigrants from Sulu Archipelago in the Philippines.
217	Bonerate	bna	6a	11,900	South Sulawesi province: Bonerate, Madu, Kalaotoa, Karompa, and Selayer islands.
218	Lisela	lcl	7	11,900	Maluku province: Buru island; Wae and Apo river valleys, and west on north Seram Sea coast; some in Ambon.
219	Malay, Berau	bve	6a	11,200	East Kalimantan province: Cape Pandan, Tanjungreder, and Muaramalinau towns on lower Segah river; Celebes Sea coast and south past Sepinang town to Cape Batube area.
220	Mateq	xem	6a	11,000	West Kalimantan province: Balaikarangan and Kembayan to Sarawak border area.
221	Pantar, Western	lev	6a	10,800	East Nusa Tenggara province: west Pantar island.
222	Totoli	txe	7	10,800	Central Sulawesi province: Toli-Toli regency, Baolan, Dampal Selatan, Dampal Utara, Dondo, Galang, and Tolitoli Utara sub-districts, 29 villages; also Kabetan island.
223	Patani	ptn	6a	10,600	North Maluku province: 9 villages on Halmahera island along the west coast.
224	Yali, Ninia	nlk	5	10,500	Papua province: central highlands, Holuwon, Lolat, and Ninia villages.
225	Saparua	spr	8a	10,200	Maluku province: Hualoy, Iha, Kairatu, Kulur, Latu, Siri-Sori, Tomalehu villages; Saparua and Seram islands.
226	Seit-Kaitetu	hik	6b	10,200	Maluku Province: Maluku Tengah regency, Piru bay, Ambon island, north coast: Seit and Kaitetu villages.
227	Ambai	amk	6b	10,100	Papua province: Yapen Waropen regency, Yapen Selatan and Yapen Timur sub-districts, 10 villages on Ambai island, Cenderawasih bay, and Yapen island south coast.
228	Bentong	bnu	6b	10,100	South Sulawesi province: Barru, Bone, Pangkep, and Maros regencies; highland areas northeast of Makassar city.
229	Blagar	beu	6a	10,000	East Nusa Tenggara province: east Pantar, north Pura, and south Ternate islands.
230	Dondo	dok	6b	10,000	Central Sulawesi province: Buol and Tolitoli regencies, Baolan, Dampal Utara, Dondo, Galang, and Tolitoli Utara sub-districts; at least 25 villages; Gorontalo province: Pohuwato regency.
231	Embaloh	emb	5	10,000	West Kalimantan province: northeast Kapuas Hulu regency, upper Kapuas river, Embaloh, Kalis, Lauh, Leboyan, Nyabau, and Palin tributaries; small area south of the Kapuas, Mandai river, and Batutenobong.
232	Kayagar	kyt	6b	10,000	Papua province: Asmat and Mappi regencies, southwest coast from Arafura sea inland.
233	Kemak	kem	6a	10,000	East Nusa Tenggara province: Belu regency; north central Timor island, East Timor border area.
234	Kubu	kvb	6b	10,000	Sumatra, Jambi province: Sarolangun and Batang Hari regencies, 2 enclaves, eastern swamp region; Riau province: Indrigiri Hulu regency, Batang Cenaku, Alim, Batu Papan, and Sungai Pampan; South Sumatra province: Musi Banyuasin regency.
235	Loura	lur	6a	10,000	East Nusa Tenggara province: Mamboru town west to Cape Karosso on northwest Sumba island.
236	Mamboru	mvd	6a	10,000	East Nusa Tenggara province: northwest Sumba island, coastal Memboro town.
237	Mandobo Atas	aax	6a	10,000	Papua province: between Tanahmerah and Mindiptanah towns, toward Fly river border in Papua New Guinea.
238	Nduga	ndx	5	10,000	Papua province: Jayawijaya regency, Tiom in central highlands, and scattered.
239	Ngalum	szb	6a	10,000	Papua province: Ok Bon, Ok Sibil, and Ok Tsop valleys.
240	Palu’e	ple	6b	10,000	East Nusa Tenggara province: Palu’e island; Flores mainland, Nangahure village northwest of Maumere.
241	So’a	ssq	6a	10,000	East Nusa Tenggara province: Flores island, central Kabupaten Ngada.
242	Tehit	kps	6b	10,000	West Papua province: Sorong regency, most of Teminabuan sub-district, half of Sawiat sub-district, about 31 villages in southwest Bird's Head.
243	Tulehu	tlu	7	10,000	Maluku province: Maluku Tengah regency, Ambon island, Liang, Tulehu, Tengah-tengah, and Tial villages.
244	Wanukaka	wnk	6a	10,000	East Nusa Tenggara province: west Sumba island, southwest coast.
245	Yaqay	jaq	6b	10,000	Papua province: Mappi regency, south coast along Obaa river north to Gandaimu area.
246	Yawa	yva	5	10,000	Papua province: central Yapen island, 8 north coast villages, 2 interior villages, and 18 south coast villages.
247	Ketengban	xte	5	9,970	Papua province: Papua New Guinea border area, east highland slopes, scattered.
248	Moma	myl	5	9,940	Central Sulawesi province: Kulawi sub-district, Kulawi and Toro town areas.
249	Bada	bhz	5	9,780	Central Sulawesi and South Sulawesi provinces: Luwu Utara and Poso regencies, Lore Selatan, Pamona Selatan, Parigi, and Poso Pesisir sub-districts; at least 24 villages. Northern Mamuju regency, Pasangkayu sub-district; some in Ampibabo sub-district, Lemusa village (Ako dialect).
250	Dampelas	dms	7	9,560	Central Sulawesi province: Donggala, Parigi-Moutong, and Toli-Toli regencies, Balaesang, Dampelas, and Sojol sub-districts, 8 villages on northwest Makassar Strait.
251	Tondano	tdn	8a	9,560	North Sulawesi province: Minahasa regency on north peninsula, Lake Tondano area.
252	Pancana	pnp	6a	9,460	Southeast Sulawesi province: central Buton island, east and west coasts.
253	Awyu, South	aws	6b	9,340	Papua province: Merauke and Mappi regencies, Bade town area; lower Digul river.
254	Manombai	woo	6a	9,110	Maluku province: Aru islands, Manombai strait to Wakua island, from Wokam village south, 21 villages; Kobror island, Benjina; Maikor island, Gardakau; Wokam island east coast, Kobamar village.
255	Asmat, Casuarina Coast	asc	5	9,000	Papua province: Mappi regency, Edera and Pantai Kasuari sub-districts on Casuarina Coast from Ewta river north to Kuti river south, and inland.
256	Asilulu	asl	6b	8,760	Maluku province: Asilulu, Negeri Lima, and Ureng, villages. Northwest Ambon island and west Seram island, Hoamoal peninsula, south coast.
257	Bidayuh, Biatah	bth	5	8,480	West Kalimantan province: Sanggau regency, area near Sarawak border; possibly northeast Landak regency.
258	Citak	txt	5	8,000	Papua province: Mappi regency, Citak-Mitak sub-district, 19 villages on south coast.
259	Kamoro	kgq	6a	8,000	Papua province: south coast; Mukamuga river into West Papua province: Etna bay area.
260	Kenyah, Wahau	whk	6b	8,000	East Kalimantan province: Berau regency, Batu Majang, Buluk Sen, Kampung Baru, Muara Pedohon, Tabang Lama, Uma’ Bekuai, and Uma’ Dian villages on upper Mahakam river.
261	Kohin	kkx	6b	8,000	Central Kalimantan province: Kotawaringin Timur regency, 10 villages in central and north Seruyan river area.
262	Korupun-Sela	kpq	5	8,000	Papua province: Jayawijaya regency, Kurima sub-district in eastern highlands, on Erok river upper reaches.
263	Lembata, South	lmf	6a	8,000	East Nusa Tenggara province: Lembata regency, south Lembata island, Atadei district.
264	Lembata, West	lmj	6a	8,000	East Nusa Tenggara province: west Lembata island.
265	Moskona	mtj	5	8,000	West Papua province: southeast Bird's Head, west Bituni Bay; Sebjor river basin.
266	Muyu, North	kti	6a	8,000	Papua province: south coast border area.
267	Selaru	slu	6b	8,000	Maluku province: Maluku Tenggara Barat regency, Tanimbar island group; at least 6 villages on Nuswotar, Selaru, and Yamdena islands; some in Ambon and Saumlaki.
268	Tarangan, West	txn	5	7,910	Maluku province: south Aru islands, Tarangan island west coast.
269	Leti	lti	7	7,710	Maluku province: Southwest Maluku regency, Leti island sub-district.
270	Suwawa	swu	7	7,590	Gorontalo province: Bone Bolango regency, Bone river valley.
271	Awyu, Central	awu	6a	7,500	Papua province: Mappi and Boven Digul regencies, Bimika, Citak Mitak, Mandobo, and Obaa sub-districts; south coast inland.
272	Beginci	ebc	6a	7,500	West Kalimantan: Ketapang regency, Nanga Tayap and Hulu Sungai.
273	Rampi	lje	6b	7,500	Central Sulawesi province: border area southwest of Lake Poso; South Sulawesi province: Luwu Utara regency, Rampi district, 6 mountain villages; Limbong, Mangkutana, Sabbang, and Wotu districts scattered.
274	Sahu	saj	5	7,500	North Maluku province: Jailolo town area on north Halmahera island.
275	Kola	kvv	6a	7,400	Maluku province: 22 villages in north Aru islands on Kola and adjacent islands.
276	Mangole	mqc	6a	7,280	North Maluku province: Sula islands on Mangole island south coast, south to Sula Besi island south tip.
277	Asmat, Central	cns	6b	7,000	Papua province: Asmat regency; Sawa-Erma, Agats, Atsy, and Pantai Kasuari sub-districts, south coast from Owap river northwest to Farec river southwest, inland; Mappi regency, Edera and Nambai sub-districts in Digul river delta area.
278	Bilba	bpz	6a	7,000	East Nusa Tenggara province: northeast Rote island; Semau island; Timor mainland near Kupang.
279	Dela-Oenale	row	6a	7,000	East Nusa Tenggara province: Rote island west coast, Dela and Oe Nale areas.
280	Marind	mrz	6b	7,000	Papua province: Merauke regency south coast area; also, enclave in extreme south Papua.
281	Mpur	akc	6b	7,000	West Papua province: Manokwari regency on north coast of Bird's Head; also Kebar valley.
282	Sou Upaa	wha	6a	7,000	Maluku province: 30 villages on north Seram island mountain area; south along Teluti bay.
283	Morop	iwo	6a	6,900	Papua province: Iwur river valley border area, Ok Iwur east to Ok Denom. Dewok (Dinamne dialect); Aurarin hamlet (Upper Dintere dialect).
284	Kaidipang	kzp	7	6,660	North Sulawesi province: Bolaang Mongondo Utara regency, Kaidipang and Bolangitang towns; north coast.
285	Maba	mqa	6a	6,620	North Maluku province: Halmahera island, Wasilei area on southeast peninsula, north coast facing Buli bay.
286	Awyu, Asue	psa	6b	6,500	Papua province: Asmat and Mappi regencies; inland from Pirimapun.
287	Luhu	lcq	6b	6,500	Maluku province: Seram Bagian Barat regency, Luhu village on northwest and south coast of Seram island, Boano and Manipa islands.
288	Napu	npy	5	6,240	Central Sulawesi province: Poso regency, Lore Utara sub-district, 10 villages in Tomini bay.
289	Tarangan, East	tre	6a	6,110	Maluku province: 12 villages in south Aru islands, Tarangan island east coast, and Maikor strait (Sungai Maikor).
290	Tajio	tdj	7	6,100	Central Sulawesi province: Ampibabo, Sindue, and Tinombo sub-districts, 21 villages on Tomini bay west coast.
291	Kamang	woi	6b	6,000	East Nusa Tenggara province: central Alor island.
292	Kepo’	kuk	6b	6,000	East Nusa Tenggara province: Manggarai Timur regency, 2 areas in central Flores island highlands.
293	Lewotobi	lwt	6a	6,000	East Nusa Tenggara province: southeastern Flores island in Lewotobi volcano area.
294	Putoh	put	6b	6,000	North Kalimantan province: Malinau and Nunukan regencies, Bangalan, Longberang, and Mensalong towns in Mentarang river area.
295	Rajong	rjg	6a	6,000	East Nusa Tenggara province: Central Flores island near Mount Watuweri, 2 areas.
296	Sajau Basap	sjb	6a	6,000	East Kalimantan province: Berau and Bulungan regencies.
297	Seko Padang	skx	6a	6,000	Central Sulawesi province: Palolo valley; South Sulawesi province: North Luwu regency, northeast Limbong sub-district.
298	Waropen	wrp	7	6,000	Papua province: Mamberamo Raya and Waropen regencies; south Waropen bay area (Ambumi dialect), and southwest to Rombak river mouth.
299	Wemale	weo	6a	6,000	Maluku province: at least 14 villages on Seram island north coast, from Taniwel to Walakone towns; also southwest Seram.
300	Kioko	ues	6b	5,970	Southeast Sulawesi province: north Buton regency, Bonegunu and Kambowa sub-districts, east central Buton island.
301	French	fra	Unestablished	5,800	
302	Bolango	bld	6b	5,770	Gorontalo province: Gorontalo Utara regency, Atinggola town area; North Sulawesi province: Bolaang Mongondow Selantan regency, Molibagu area; Bolaang Mongondow Utara regency.
303	Ambelau	amv	6a	5,700	Maluku province: central Ambelau island; Buru island coast, Wae Tawa village; 8 villages.
304	German, Standard	deu	Unestablished	5,700	
305	Dobel	kvo	5	5,680	Maluku province: Kepulauan Aru regency, Aru islands; Kobror island central and east coast, 18 villages; southeast Wokam island, 1 village; 4 villages in east Barakai strait on Kobror and Koba islands; 2 villages south of Beding Warlai town; many in Dobo; some in Ambon.
306	Una	mtg	5	5,600	Papua province: Langda, Bomela, and Sumtamon areas in east Weip and Yay valleys.
307	Iha	ihp	6a	5,500	West Papua province: Fakfak regency, Fakfak, Kaimana, and Kokas sub-districts on west Bomberai peninsula.
308	Kaera	jka	6a	5,500	East Nusa Tenggara province: Abangiwang, Bibit Gomi, Matgomi/Weniwa, Padangsul, Pantar, and Tamalabang villages on northeast coast.
309	Dhao	nfa	5	5,000	East Nusa Tenggara province: Rote Ndao regency, Ndao island off western tip of Rote island; scattered settlements on Rote and Timor islands.
310	Dusun Witu	duw	6b	5,000	Central Kalimantan province: South Barito regency, near Pendang and Buntokecil towns.
311	Karon Dori	kgw	6a	5,000	West Papua province: Asses, Pef, Siakwa, and Sunopi villages; central Bird's Head Kamundan river headwaters area.
312	Klon	kyo	6b	5,000	East Nusa Tenggara province: Alor regency, Halerman, Manatang, Margera, Probur, Probur Utara, and Tribur villages.
313	Kula	tpg	6a	5,000	East Nusa Tenggara province: Alor island, northeast coast, Kiralela, Koilela, Maukuru, Peisaka, and Takala villages; also east central mountains.
314	Ngad’a, Eastern	nea	6a	5,000	East Nusa Tenggara province: south central Flores, Desa Rowa, Kabupaten Ngada, Kecamatan Boawae, Kecamatan Golewa, Sanga Deto, Sara Sedu, and Taka Tunga.
315	Rembong	reb	6a	5,000	East Nusa Tenggara province: north central Flores island.
316	Silimo	wul	5	5,000	Papua province: central highlands, Amo and Kiniage valleys.
317	Wamesa	wad	6b	5,000	West Papua province: Manokwari, Wasior, Wandamen bay to Bintuni bay east end.
318	Wolani	wod	5	5,000	Papua province: west central highlands, Kemandoga and Mbiyandogo rivers area northeast of Lake Paniai, north of Wissel Lakes.
319	Yali, Pass Valley	yac	6a	5,000	Papua province: central highlands, Jayawijaya, Kurima, and Kurulu regencies.
320	Saleman	sau	6b	4,800	Maluku province: Maluku Tengah regency on Saleman bay, north central Seram island, 3 areas.
321	Ansus	and	6b	4,600	Papua province: Yapen Waropen regency, Yapen Barat sub-district, Aibondeni, Ansus, Kairawi, and Yenusi villages on Yapen island south coast.
322	Moi Kelim	mxn	7	4,600	West Papua province: 9 villages on west Bird's Head; Salawati island, Sorong city east and southeast.
323	Taliabu	tlv	6a	4,520	North Maluku province: Sula island group; Taliabu island northwest coast; some on Mangole island.
324	Bobot	bty	6b	4,500	Maluku province: Seram Bagian Timur regency, Werinama sub-district, southeast from Atiahu village to Kota Baru; Tunsai village in Liana area.
325	Dusun Malang	duq	6b	4,500	Central Kalimantan province: North Barito regency, northeast and west of Muarainu town; East Kalimantan province: Kutai Barat regency, small border area.
326	Babar, Southeast	vbb	6a	4,460	Maluku province: Ahanari, Analutur, Kokwari, Kroing, Letwurung, Manuweri, Tutuwawan, and Wakpapai villages; southeast Babar island coast.
327	Barakai	baj	6a	4,450	Maluku province: Apara, Bemun, Longgar, and Mesiang villages in the south; Barakai island; some on Gomo-Gomo island northeast of Barakai.
328	Nggem	nbq	5	4,400	Papua province: middle Hablifoeri river north of Wamena.
329	Burusu	bqr	6a	4,350	East Kalimantan province: Bulungan regency, Sesayap sub-district, Sekatakbunyi town area.
330	Behoa	bep	6b	4,280	Central Sulawesi province: Poso regency, Lore Utara sub-district, 8 villages; Behoa and Napu valleys.
331	Bakati’	bei	6b	4,000	West Kalimantan province: Sambas regency; Sambas river headwaters.
332	Bakati’, Sara	sre	6a	4,000	West Kalimantan province: near Sanggau-Ledo.
333	Irarutu	irh	6b	4,000	West Papua province: Fakfak, north Kaimana, and Teluk Bintani regencies on east Bomberai peninsula, Arguni bay north to Bintuni bay southwest, 44 villages.
334	Kombai	tyn	6b	4,000	Papua province: Asmat regency, between upper Wideman and Digul rivers.
335	Lamalera	lmr	6a	4,000	East Nusa Tenggara province: 3 or more villages on Lembata island south coast.
336	Lamatuka	lmq	6a	4,000	East Nusa Tenggara province: central Lembata island, several villages between Ile Ape [ila] and Lewoeleng [lwe] language areas.
337	Levuka	lvu	6a	4,000	East Nusa Tenggara province: west central Lembata island.
338	Lewoeleng	lwe	6a	4,000	East Nusa Tenggara province: central eastern Lembata island; north coastal plains villages are from recent government-induced migration.
339	Ma’ya	slz	6b	4,000	West Papua province: Raja Ampat archipelago on east Bantanta, central Salawati islands, and Misool island.
340	Muyu, South	kts	6a	4,000	Papua province: south coast, north of Fly river border with Papua New Guinea.
341	Rongga	ror	6a	4,000	East Nusa Tenggara province: south central Flores island.
342	Teiwa	twe	6a	4,000	East Nusa Tenggara province: 6 villages on central Pantar island.
343	Watubela	wah	6a	4,000	Maluku province: Watubela islands east central area.
344	Kabola	klz	6a	3,900	East Nusa Tenggara province: northwest Alor island, Bird's Head area.
345	Laha	lhh	6a	3,890	Maluku province: Laha and other villages on Ambon island south central coast.
346	Awyu, Edera	awy	6b	3,870	Papua province: Merauke regency, both banks, lower Digul river.
347	Tabla	tnm	8a	3,750	Papua province: Jayapura regency, Bukia, Depapre, and Wari towns, and 13 villages on north coast.
348	Kokoda	xod	6b	3,700	West Papua province: Sorong Selatan regency in Bird's Head, northwest coast of Maccluer gulf.
349	Wersing	kvw	6a	3,700	East Nusa Tenggara province: Alor island, Pietoko, Pureman, and 2 enclaves on central north, east, and southeast coasts.
350	Malay, Banda	bpq	6a	3,690	Maluku province: south Banda islands.
351	Batuley	bay	6b	3,640	Maluku province: Aru islands regency, Arafura Sea east coast offshore communities, 7 island villages.
352	Tado	klw	5	3,640	Central Sulawesi province: Lindu sub-district, Anca, Langko, and Tomado villages near Lake Lindu.
353	Bati	bvt	6b	3,500	Maluku province: Seram island east coast between Kian Darat and Keleser towns, inland.
354	Korowai	khe	6a	3,500	Papua province: southeast inland area between upper Sirac and Digul rivers.
355	Sawi	saw	8a	3,500	Papua Province: Asmat Regency, Pantai Kasuari and Fayit subdistricts, near south coastal lowland, between Kronkel and Ayip rivers and upper Fayit river area, Kamur, Esebor, Wiagas, Minahai, and Comoro villages.
356	Tamagario	tcg	6a	3,500	Papua province: south coast area.
357	Okolod	kqv	6a	3,390	East Kalimantan province: Sabah border area in northwest.
358	Pagu	pgu	7	3,310	North Maluku province: Halmahera Utara regency on lower Kao river and west to interior foothills.
359	Balaesang	bls	7	3,300	Central Sulawesi province: Donggala regency, Balaesang sub-district, Kamonji, Ketong, and Rano villages on Manimbayu peninsula.
360	Mairasi	zrs	5	3,300	Papua province; West Papua province: Bomberai peninsula, southwest coast facing Arafura Sea, southeast from Arguni bay.
361	Kalabra	kzz	6a	3,290	West Papua province: west Bird's Head, Kalabra river inland.
362	Boano	bzn	6a	3,240	Maluku province: North Buano main village; Boano and Seram islands.
363	Kur	kuv	6b	3,180	Maluku province: west Kei Kecil district in Kur and surrounding islands southeast.
364	Murut, Sembakung	sbr	6b	3,180	East Kalimantan province: Nunukan regency, Sembakung river mouth.
365	Padoe	pdo	6b	3,100	South Sulawesi province: Luwu Utara regency, Malili, Mangkutana, and Nuha sub-districts, 9 villages inland between Lake Matano and Usu arm of Bone bay.
366	Malimpung	mli	6b	3,090	South Sulawesi province: Pinrang regency, Patampanua sub-district, Malimpung, Sulili (part), and Urung villages; north Sadang river.
367	Abun	kgr	6b	3,000	West Papua province: Sorong regency, Ayamaru, Moraid, and Sausapor sub-districts, about 20 villages; north coast, interior of central Bird's Head.
368	Adang	adn	6b	3,000	East Nusa Tenggara province: Alor island, northwest of Kalabahi town toward Banda Sea coast.
369	Aghu	ahh	6b	3,000	Papua province: Boven Digoel regency, Jair sub-district in south interior between Mapi and Digul rivers.
370	Banda	bnd	7	3,000	Maluku province: Maluku Tenggara regency, Banda-Eli and Banda-Elat villages, possibly a third; Kei Besar island west and northeast.
371	Hupla	hap	6b	3,000	Papua province: central highlands area, Baliem gorge.
372	Kayan, Busang	bfg	6b	3,000	Central Kalimantan province; East Kalimantan province: Muller Mountains, Belayan, upper Mahakam, and Oga river areas.
373	Kimaghima	kig	6b	3,000	Papua province: Merauke regency, Kolopom island interior.
374	Liana-Seti	ste	6b	3,000	Maluku province: Maluku Tengah and Seram Bagian regencies, Tehoru, Timur Bula, and Werinama districts, 8 villages from east Teluti bay north to Seram Sea coast.
375	Lik	eip	6b	3,000	Papua province: Eastern highlands, Eipo river area.
376	Nasal	nsy	6a	3,000	Bengkulu province: Kaur regency, Gedung Menung, Tanjung Baru, and Tanjung Betuah villages in Nasal river area on Sumatra.
377	Sawila	swt	6b	3,000	East Nusa Tenggara Province: southeast Alor island, between Kula [tpg] and Wersing [kvw] language areas.
378	Uma’ Lung	ulu	6b	3,000	North Kalimantan province: Bulungan regency, small area; Malinau regency, Batu Kajang, Pimping, Long Belua, Long Setulang, Long Uli villages on middle Malinau river.
379	Wae Rana	wrx	6b	3,000	East Nusa Tenggara province: south central Flores island, 2 separate areas between Manggarai [mqy] and Ngad’a [nxg] language areas.
380	Waioli	wli	6b	3,000	North Maluku province: northwest Halmahera island coast from Sasu town inland to highland interior.
381	Wambon	wms	6b	3,000	Papua province: Boven Digoel regency, Ambatkwi sub-district.
382	Gane	gzn	6b	2,900	North Maluku province: Halmahera island, south peninsula.
383	Marind, Bian	bpv	7	2,900	Papua province: Merauke regency, Muting sub-district, Sanayu village in upper Bian river area.
384	Seluwasan	sws	6b	2,840	Maluku province: Maluku Tenggara Barat regency, Batu Putih, Makatian, Marantutu, and Wermatang villages in Tanimbar island group on Yamdena island southwest coast.
385	Koneq-koneq	cml	6b	2,830	West Sulawesi province: Polewali Mandar regency on Mandar bay south coast.
386	Bintauna	bne	7	2,800	North Sulawesi province: Bolaang Mongondou Utara regency, Bintauna town and inland; Celebes Sea.
387	Damar, East	dmr	6b	2,800	Maluku province: southeast, 6 villages; east Damar island.
388	Gebe	gei	6b	2,650	North Maluku province: Gag, Gebe, and Yoi’umiya islands, 4 villages; Special Region of West Papua province: Halmahera island.
389	Aoheng	pni	6b	2,630	Central Kalimantan province: border areas; East Kalimantan province: Sarawak border area, upper reaches of Barito, Kapuas, and Mahakam rivers.
390	Sepa	spb	6b	2,600	Maluku province: Sepa village on Seram island, and several areas on southwest coast.
391	Tugutil	tuj	6b	2,590	North Maluku province: East Halmahera regency, Maba district, Miaf, Bebsili, and Marasipno villages; Wasile district, pass between Lolobata and Buli; North Halmahera regency, Kao district, Taboulamo area; Tobelo district, Kusuri. Dodaga, Tutuling, Akelamo, and Mabulan rivers in Maba district.
392	Sarudu	sdu	6b	2,550	West Sulawesi province: Mamuju Utara regency, south Pasangkayu sub-district, 1 area near Lariang river mouth, another south, both on Makassar strait north coast.
393	Buli	bzq	6b	2,520	North Maluku province: central Halmahera, 3 villages on Buli bay north shore.
394	Barapasi	brp	6b	2,500	Papua province: Yapen Waropen regency, Waropen Atas sub-district; east Cenderawasih bay, Barapasi river area and tributaries.
395	Gresi	grs	8a	2,500	Papua province: Jayapura regency, Bring, Hawa, Ibub, Klaysu, Sunna, Tabangkwari, and Yansu villages.
396	Kemtuik	kmt	7	2,500	Papua province: Jayapura regency, Aib, Aimbe, Braso, Mamda, Mamdayawang, Meikari, Merem, Sabeyap, Sabeyap Kecil, Sabron Yaru, Sabransamon, Sekorup, and Yanim villages; Lake Sentani southwest area.
397	Kwerba	kwe	6b	2,500	Papua province: Apiaweti, Aurime, Munukania, Tatsewalem, and Wamariri villages in Apauwer river headwaters.
398	Nipsan	nps	6b	2,500	Papua province: Jayawijaya regency, Kurima sub-district west of Hmanggona.
399	Seko Tengah	sko	6b	2,500	South Sulawesi province: west Limbong sub-district along Betue river.
400	Boano	bzl	6b	2,400	Central Sulawesi province: Parigi Moutong sub-district, Bolano village; north peninsula, south coast, facing gulf of Tomini.
401	Kamaru	kgx	6b	2,330	Southeast Sulawesi province: Buton regency, east Buton island on Lawelu bay.
402	Awyu, Jair	awv	6b	2,300	Papua province: Merauke district.
403	Yale, Kosarek	kkl	5	2,300	Papua province: eastern highlands.
404	Kaimbulawa	zka	6a	2,290	Southeast Sulawesi province: Kaimbulawa and Lantoi villages on Siompu island, southwest Buton island, Kambe-kambero village.
405	Tombelala	ttp	6b	2,240	Central Sulawesi province: Morowali regency, Bungku Tengah sub-district, 4 villages on Tolo bay west coast.
406	Kurudu	kjr	6b	2,180	Papua province: Mamberamo Raya regency, Kaipuri and Poiwai villages; Kurudu islands.
407	Latu	ltu	7	2,130	Maluku province: Seram Bagian Barat regency, Latu village; west Seram island, southwest Elpaputih bay, Point Latu.
408	Bobongko	bgb	6a	2,050	Central Sulawesi province: Batu Daka island, Tumbulawa village on northwest coast; Togian islands, Lembanato village on Kilat bay, north side of Togian island.
409	Anasi	bpo	6b	2,000	Papua province: Jayapura regency, Mamberamo Hilir sub-district on north coast, lower west bank Mamberamo river.
410	Asmat, Yaosakor	asy	7	2,000	Papua province: Asmat regency, Agats and Atsy sub-districts; lower Surets and Eilanden rivers confluence area.
411	Emem	enr	6b	2,000	Papua province: Keerom and Pegunungan Bintang regencies, border area south of Jayapura city.
412	Gerai	gef	5	2,000	West Kalimantan: Ketapang regency.
413	Kayan, Kayan River	xkn	6b	2,000	East Kalimantan province: Kayan river headwaters south, and downstream.
414	Kwesten	kwt	7	2,000	Papua province: Sarmi regency, Arare, Holmhaven, Mafenter, and Omte villages in Pacific coast area.
415	Laba	lau	6b	2,000	North Maluku province: south Loloda district, 4 villages; Halmahera island northwest interior.
416	Lubu	lcf	6a	2,000	North Sumatera province: Mandailing Natal regency, Kotanopan district.
417	Modole	mqo	6b	2,000	North Maluku province: Kao river headwaters on north Halmahera island.
418	Momuna	mqf	6b	2,000	Papua province: west Asmat regency into Yahukimo regency; lowlands south of main ranges.
419	Murut, Tagal	mvv	6b	2,000	North Kalimantan province: Nunukan regency, northwest valley east to Simalumung.
420	Nimboran	nir	8a	2,000	Papua province: Jayapura regency, about 26 villages west of Lake Sentani.
421	Pom	pmo	6b	2,000	Papua province: Kepulauan Yapen regency, Mias Endi, Pom, and Serewen villages on Yapen island, from Pon bay west to Woko point; some on east Num island.
422	Punan Tubu	puj	6b	2,000	East Kalimantan province: Malinau, Mentarang, and Sembakung river areas.
423	Segai	sge	6b	2,000	East Kalimantan province: Berau regency. Kelai river area around Longlaai town.
424	Sikaritai	tty	5	2,000	Papua province: Haya, Iri, and Sikari villages in Lakes plain area.
425	Lisabata-Nuniali	lcs	6b	1,830	Maluku province: 5 villages on west and north Seram island.
426	Pendau	ums	6b	1,820	Central Sulawesi province: Balaesang sub-district, Sibayu, Walandano, and other villages; scattered north to Dampal Utara district.
427	Isirawa	srl	6b	1,800	Papua province: Jayapura, north coast, Sarmi regency: Amsira, Arabais, Arsania, Kamenawari, Mararena, Martewar, Nisero, Nuerawar, Perkami, Siaratesa, Waim, Wari, and Webro villages.
428	Woi	wbw	6b	1,800	Papua province: west Yapen island, Wooi and Wainap villages.
429	Komodo	kvh	6b	1,730	East Nusa Tenggara province: Manggarai Barat regency, Komodo island.
430	Marau	mvr	6b	1,700	Papua province: 5 villages on east Yapen island, Cenderawasih bay.
431	Roma	rmm	6b	1,700	Maluku province: Jerusu village on Roma island.
432	Yalahatan	jal	7	1,700	Maluku province: Makulu Tengah regency, south central Seram island coastal area.
433	Nafri	nxx	8a	1,630	Papua province: Jayapura area, Nafri village on southeast Yotafa bay.
434	Ambel	wgo	7	1,600	West Papua province: Raja Ampat regency, Waigeo Selatan sub-district, Go, Kabare, Kabilol, Nyandesawai, Selegop, Waifoi, and Warsanbin villages in north central Waigeo island off western Bird's Head.
435	Orya	ury	6b	1,600	Papua province: Jayapura and Sarmi regencies, Bonggo, Lereh, and Unurum-Guay sub-districts, Taja, Wamho, and Witi villages.
436	Kamberau	irx	7	1,570	West Papua province: Kaimana regency, Bahomia, Coa, Inari, Koi, Tanggaromi, Ubia-Seramuku, Waho, Wamesa, and Wamoma villages; southeast Bomberai peninsula, Kamerau bay area.
437	Awyu, North	yir	6b	1,500	Papua province: Merauke district; Digul river west side.
438	Bauzi	bvz	5	1,500	Papua province: Jayapura and Yapen Waropen regencies, Mamberamo Tengah and Waropen Atas sub-districts, Danau Bira, Itaba, Kustera, Neao, Noiadi, Solom, and Vakiadi villages; extensive inland area between Mamberamo and Rouffaer rivers.
439	Edopi	dbf	6b	1,500	Papua province: southwest Mamberamo Raya and north Puncak regencies; Rouffaer river between Splitsingbivak and Motorbivak.
440	Gamkonora	gak	6b	1,500	North Maluku province: Halmahera island, Baru town and inland on northwest coast.
441	Iau	tmu	5	1,500	Papua province: Puncak Jaya regency, Bakusi, Duita, Fawi, and Fi villages between Rouffaer and Van Daalen rivers.
442	Kayan, Mendalam	xkd	6b	1,500	West Kalimantan province: along Mendalam river.
443	Kemberano	bzp	6b	1,500	West Papua province: several villages on Bird's Head south coast, northwest Bomberai peninsula, Kalitami across Bintuni bay.
444	Kodeoha	vko	6b	1,500	Southeast Sulawesi province: North Kolaka regency, Lasusua sub-district, 4 villages in upper Bone bay, east coast.
445	Manipa	mqp	6b	1,500	Maluku province: Central Maluku regency, 4 villages on Manipa island, west of Seram island.
446	Nedebang	nec	6b	1,500	East Nusa Tenggara province: north central Pantar island in Banda sea.
447	Nuaulu, South	nxl	6b	1,500	Maluku province: Amahai district, 6 villages on Seram island inland from south coast.
448	Uma’ Lasan	xky	6b	1,500	East Kalimantan province: Malinau regency, Long Jelet Mesahan, Long Pejalin (Uma Alim dialect), and Long Pujungan villages.
449	Wabo	wbb	7	1,500	Papua province: Kepulauan Yapen regency, 6 villages on Yapen island, north and south coast.
450	Welaun	wlh	6a	1,500	East Nusa Tenggara: Belu regency, Asumanu, Baudaok, Bauho, Raiulun, Sarabau, Silawan, Tohe, and Tulakadi.
451	Fayu	fau	6b	1,400	Papua province: Kliki river area; northwest towards Cenderawasik bay.
452	Ili’uun	ilu	6b	1,400	Maluku province: Erai, Esulit, Ilmaumau, Istutun, Karbubu, Klishatu, Nabar, and Telemar villages southwest; Lirang island; Wetar island southwest tip.
453	Yetfa	yet	6a	1,400	Papua province: Pegunungan Bintang regency, Okbibab sub-district.
454	Ratahan	rth	8b	1,340	North Sulawesi province: Minahasa regency on northeast peninsula and Tomini bay.
455	Kayan Mahakam	xay	6b	1,300	East Kalimantan province: Malinau and West Kutai regencies; Muller Mountains from south border north almost to Malaysia.
456	Sowari	dmy	8a	1,300	Papua province: Ambora, Muris Besar, Muris Kecil, and Yougafsa villages on north coast.
457	Yei	jei	7	1,280	Papua province: Merauke regency, 6 villages in south coast area, along Maro river.
458	Dawera-Daweloor	ddw	7	1,270	Maluku province: Maluku Barat Daya regency, Wiratan, Watuwei, and Nurnyaman villages in Banda Sea on twin coral islands northeast of Babar island; Daweloor island; Dawera island, Ilmarang, Letmasa, and Welora villages.
459	Matbat	xmt	6b	1,250	West Papua province: Raja Ampat archipelago in Misool and Segaf islands.
460	Oirata	oia	7	1,220	Maluku province: southeast Maluku Barat Daya regency; Kisar island, Oirata village; some in Ambon city.
461	Bantik	bnq	8a	1,200	North Sulawesi province: Manado city area, 11 villages; north peninsula, northeast section.
462	Berik	bkl	6b	1,200	Papua province: Sarmi regency, Tor Atas sub-district, Beu, Bora Bora, Dangken, Doronta, Kondirjan, Safrontani, Sewan, Somanente, Taminambor, Tenwer, Togonfo, and Waf villages; north coast, mid and upper Tor river, inland from Sarmi peninsula.
463	Koneraw	kdw	7	1,200	Papua province: Merauke regency, Kolopom island south coast.
464	Mekwei	msf	8a	1,200	Papua province: Jayapura regency, Kendate, Maribu, Sabron Dosay, and Waibrong villages.
465	Moi Lemas	sbg	7	1,200	West Papua province: west Bird's Head southwest of Sorong, Walian, Sailolof, Segum, and Seget villages.
466	Ndom	nqm	6b	1,200	Papua province: Kolopom island.
467	Serui-Laut	seu	7	1,200	Papua province: Kepulauan Yapen regency, Serui town area on Yapen island south coast; west past Panduan point; Sareba bay on Nau island; 5 villages.
468	Tugun	tzn	6a	1,200	Maluku province: southwest in Arwala, Ilpokil, Ilway, Kahailin, Mahuan, Masapun, and Tomliapat villages; southeast Wetar island.
469	Wanggom	wng	6b	1,180	Papua province: Boven Digoel regency, upper Digul river area.
470	Lasalimu	llm	6b	1,150	Southeast Sulawesi province: Buton regency, Lasalimu sub-district, Lasalima town, Lasalimu and Malaoge villages facing Lawelu bay on Buton island.
471	Dakka	dkk	7	1,140	West Sulawesi province: Polewali-Mandar regency, Wonomulyo sub-district.
472	Kata Kolok	bqy	5	1,125	Bali province: Northern Bali, Buleleng regency, Kubutambahan District, Desa Kolok, about 20 km east of Singaraja.
473	Baham	bdw	6b	1,100	West Papua province: northwest Bomberai peninsula, Fakfak regency, Fakfak, Kaimana, and Kokas sub-districts; Kaimana regency, Cape Papisoi area.
474	Riantana	ran	6b	1,100	Papua province: Kolopom island.
475	Roon	rnn	6b	1,100	West Papua province: Roon island west of Cenderawasih bay.
476	Teor	tev	6b	1,100	Maluku province: Watubela archipelago, Teor and Ut islands.
477	Tela-Masbuar	tvm	6a	1,050	Maluku province: Maluku Barat Daya regency, Masbuar and Tela villages on southwest Babar island.
478	Ujir	udj	7	1,030	Maluku province: Kepulauan-Aru regency; northwest Aru islands on Udjir and Wokam islands.
479	Kumbewaha	xks	6b	1,010	Southeast Sulawesi province: Buton regency, Lasalimu sub-district, Kumbewaha and Wajah Jaya villages on southeast Buton island.
480	Airoran	air	6b	1,000	Papua province: Jayapura regency, Mamberamo Hilir and Pantai Barat sub-districts, Isirania, Motobiak, Subu, and other villages on lower Apauwer river.
481	Arandai	jbj	6b	1,000	West Papua province: Manokwari regency, Bintuni sub-district; South Bird's Head, Ceram Sea coast.
482	Asmat, North	nks	6a	1,000	Papua province: Merauke regency, Sawa-Erma sub-district. Near Pater Le Cocq river headwaters west to Unir river east to the foothills.
483	Atohwaim	aqm	6b	1,000	Papua province: Mappi regency, Pantai Kasuari sub-district. South coast inland, between Cook and Kronkel rivers.
484	Babar, North	bcd	6b	1,000	Maluku province: Maluku Barat Daya regency, Ilwiara, Nakarhamto, and Yatoke villages, northeast Babar island.
485	Buruwai	asi	7	1,000	West Papua province: Fakfak and Kaimana regencies, Esania, Gaka, Guriasa, Hia, Kuna, Marobia, Tairi, and Yarona villages in Kamrau bay southwest.
486	Dem	dem	6b	1,000	Papua province: Western highlands along Rouffaer river headwaters.
487	Gorap	goq	7	1,000	North Maluku province: Halmahera Utara regency, Bobane and Igo villages; Pulau Morotai regency, Pilowo and Waringin villages on Morotai island.
488	Hovongan	hov	6b	1,000	East Kalimantan province: border area northeast near Sarawak; West Kalimantan province: Kapuas Hulu regency.
489	Kafoa	kpu	6b	1,000	East Nusa Tenggara province: Alor island, southwest enclave.
490	Masiwang	bnf	6b	1,000	Maluku province: Bula district along Seram island northeast coast.
491	Moraid	msg	6b	1,000	West Papua province: west Bird's Head inland, Mata to Worbo area.
492	Ninggerum	nxr	6b	1,000	Papua province: Boven Digoel regency on Papua New Guinea border.
493	Rohingya	rhg	Unestablished	1,000	
494	Semimi	etz	7	1,000	Papua province: Nabire regency, border area west of Lake Jamur; West Papua province: Kaimana regency, Bomberai peninsula from Tarera bay west and north to Lacmora and Aiwasa lakes area.
495	Sempan	xse	6b	1,000	Papua province: middle south coast, between Agats and Kokonao.
496	Sobei	sob	7	1,000	Papua province: Sarmi regency, Sarmi sub-district, north coast area, Bagaiserwar, Sarmi, and Sawar villages.
497	Wano	wno	6b	1,000	Papua province: Puncak and Puncak Jaya regencies in central highlands area; Van Daalen river to upper Rouffaer river.
498	Koroni	xkq	7	980	Central Sulawesi province: Morowali regency, Bungku Tengah sub-district, Unsongi village on Tolo bay east coast.
499	Duvle	duv	6b	930	Papua province: south of Van Daalen river; Dagai river (Eastern Duvle), Fedide and Wedi rivers (Western Duvle).
500	Hamap	hmu	6b	900	East Nusa Tenggara province: Alor island, Moru town area, 2 villages in east Kalabahi bay.
501	Ketum	ktt	6b	900	Papua province: foothills on east Digul river.
502	Lengilu	lgi	7	900	North Kalimantan province: Long Layu’, Long Padi.
503	Limola	ley	6b	900	South Sulawesi province: Luwu Utara regency, Sassa and Salassa villages, in middle Rongko river area; scattered in Sabbang sub-district.
504	Lola	lcd	6b	900	Maluku province: Kepulauan Aru regency, Jambuair, Lola, and Warabal villages in Aru island group on Barakan, Lola, and Penambulai islands.
505	Enggano	eno	6b	870	Bengkulu province: Enggano island, southwest of mainland; 4 small nearby islands.
506	Koba	kpd	6b	870	Maluku province: southeast, at least 3 villages; Aru island group, Baun and Fukarel islands in mouth of Barakai strait.
507	Batui	zbt	7	850	Central Sulawesi province: Banggai regency, Batui sub-district, Balantang, Batui, Sisipan, and Tolando villages; eastern peninsula.
508	Masela, West	mss	7	850	Maluku province: 5 villages on Masela island west tip.
509	Mawes	mgk	6b	850	Papua province: Sarmi regency, Bonggo sub-district, Mawes Dai, Mawes Mukti, and Mawes Wres villages on Buri river west bank inland.
510	Sa’ban	snv	6b	850	North Kalimantan province: Nunukan regency.
511	Dai	dij	6b	820	Maluku province: Maluku Barat Daya regency, Sinairusi, 3 other villages on Lewa island.
512	Damar, West	drn	6b	800	Maluku province: southeast, 2 villages; north Damar island.
513	Munggui	mth	6b	800	Papua province: Yapen island north coast, 1 village.
514	Reta	ret	6b	800	East Nusa Tenggara province: Alor regency, south Pura and south Ternate (Alor) islands.
515	Suabo	szp	6b	800	West Papua province: south Bird's Head, 15 villages along Maccluer bay.
516	Tereweng	twg	6b	800	East Nusa Tenggara province: 2 villages on Tereweng island; 1 village on Pantar island.
517	Bonggo	bpg	8a	790	Papua province: Sarmi regency, Bonggo sub-district.
518	Bahonsuai	bsu	7	780	Central Sulawesi province: Morowali regency, Bungku Tengah sub-district, Bahonsuai village on the east coast, Tolo bay.
519	Tsaukambo	kvz	6b	780	Papua province: upper Digul river west side.
520	Panasuan	psn	6a	770	South Sulawesi province: Luwu Utara regency northwest; West Sulawesi province: Mamuju regency, Kalumpang and Seko sub-districts, 2 villages.
521	Busami	bsm	6b	700	Papua province: Yapen Waropen regency, Yapen Barat and Yapen Selatan sub-districts, Kamanap, Kaonda and Masiaroti villages on south and north coast of Yapen island.
522	Kais	kzm	7	700	West Papua province: Sorong Selatan regency, south Bird's Head area; inland along Kais river: 8 villages.
523	Mor	mhz	7	700	West Papua province: Nabire regency, Mor islands, east Cenderawasih bay; coastal area northeast of Ruwianui point.
524	Nakai	nkj	6b	700	Papua province: east of upper Digul river, Awimbom village in the center of 5 other villages extending toward Ok Sibil northeast, and southwest toward Morop [iwo] language area.
525	Puragi	pru	6b	700	West Papua province: Sorong Selatan regency on southwest Bird's Head along Maccluer Gulf, Matamani river area, and inland.
526	Skou	skv	6a	700	Papua province: Sko-Mabu, Sko-Sai, and Sko-Yambe villages, north coast border area at Tami river mouth.
527	Galolen	gal	6b	680	Maluku province: Maluku Barat Daya regency, Iliwaki village on Wetar island.
528	Busoa	bup	7	670	Southeast Sulawesi province: South Buton regency, Batauga district, Busoa and Lakambau villages, around 22 km south of the town of Baubau.
529	Tonsea	txs	6b	670	North Sulawesi province: Minahasa Utara regency, Kota Bitung and Kota Manado cities.
530	Sedoa	tvw	5	660	Central Sulawesi province: Lore Utara subdistrict, Sedoa village; Poso Pesisir subdistrict, parts of Tambarona and Pinedapa villages.
531	Tause	tad	6a	650	Papua province: Mamberamo Raya and Waropen regencies, 3 areas on Rouffaer river.
532	Kelabit	kzi	6b	640	East Kalimantan province: Nunukan regency, 2 remote mountain enclaves, on Sarawak border.
533	Murut, Selungai	slg	6b	640	East Kalimantan province: Nunukan regency on upper Sembakung river.
534	Tarpia	tpf	8a	630	Papua province: Jayapura regency, Demta sub-district, Tarfia village on north coast.
535	Vitou	vto	7	630	Papua province: Sarmi regency, Pantai Timur sub-district, Takar village inland.
536	Warembori	wsa	7	620	Papua province: Maberamo Raya regency, Bonoi, Poiwai, Tamakuri, and Warembori villages, Mamberamo river mouth west to Manini point.
537	Karey	kyd	6b	610	Maluku province: Tarangan island southeast coast, Karey valley in Aru Islands.
538	Betaf	bfe	6b	600	Papua province: Sarmi regency, Pantai Timur sub-district; north coast area east of Sarmi.
539	Kaburi	uka	6b	600	West Papua province: Sorong Selatan and Teluk Bintuni regencies, Inanwatan and Merdei sub-districts; south Bird's Head and west bank lower Kamundan river.
540	Kawe	kgb	6b	600	West Papua province: Raja Ampat regency, Bird's Head west coast, Bianci, Menyefun, Salio, and Selepele villages; Batangpele, Kawe, Minjaifuin, Waigeo, and nearby islands.
541	Kowiai	kwh	6b	600	West Papua province: Kaimana regency, Adijaya, Kayumerah, Keroi, and Namatota villages; Bomberai peninsula, Kamrau bay area, Kaimana, Namatote, and Adi islands, smaller islands in bay.
542	Papuma	ppm	6b	600	Papua province: Kepulauan Yapen regency, Papuma village on Yapen island south coast.
543	Bukitan	bkn	6b	570	North Kalimantan province: Malinau regency on Sarawak border, 2 enclaves on Iwan river.
544	Imroing	imr	7	560	Maluku province: Maluku Barat Daya regency, Emroing village; Babar island southwest.
545	Sunum	ymn	8a	560	Papua province: Sarmi regency, Pantai Timur sub-district, coastal area and Nirumoar island.
546	Foau	flh	6a	550	Papua province: Jayapura and Mamberamo Raya regencies, Kecamatan sub-district, 1 village; Mamberamo basin region on Dijai river.
547	Mo	wkd	7	550	Papua province: Sarmi regency, Pantai Timur sub-district; Wakde island, and north coastal area.
548	Eritai	ert	6b	530	Papua province: Sarmi regency, Mamberamo Hulu and Mamberamo Tengah sub-districts, Erai, Haya, and Kustera villages; low mountains, Kustera airstrip area.
549	Lepki	lpe	6b	530	Papua province: Pegunungan Bintang regency, Teiraplu, Yefta, and Aboy districts, west of Sungai Sobger.
550	Masela, East	vme	8a	520	Maluku province: Maluku Barat Daya regency, 3 villages from Welulora to Latalola Besar on east central Marsela island west coast.
551	Masela, Central	mxz	8a	510	Maluku province: Maluku Barat Daya regency, 3 villages in Ilbutung area on Marsela island.
552	Kaibobo	kzb	8b	500	Maluku province: Seram Bagian Barat regency, Kairatu sub-district, Hatusua, Kaibobo, Kamarian, Seruawan, Tihulale, and Waisamu villages; west Seram island, north Piru bay area.
553	Kayan, Wahau	whu	6b	500	East Kalimantan province: Kutai Timur regency, Telen river north tributary.
554	Kereho	xke	6b	500	Central Kalimantan province: Murung Raya regency; East Kalimantan province: Kutai Barat regency; West Kalimantan province: east Kapuas Hulu regency.
555	Kimki	sbt	6b	500	Papua province: Pegunungan Bintang regency, Batom sub-district, near Sepik river entrance to Papua New Guinea.
556	Konda	knd	6b	500	West Papua province: Sorong Selatan regency, Teminabuan sub-district, Konda village; lower Waromge river in southwest Bird's Head facing Seram Sea.
557	Kuri	nbn	7	500	West Papua province: Teluk Bintuni regency, 16 villages in southwest Bomberai peninsula.
558	Kwinsu	kuc	6b	500	Papua province: Sarmi regency, Pantai Timur sub-district, Ansudu village.
559	Nisa	njs	6b	500	Papua province: east Geelvink bay inland, Danau Nisa area.
560	Nuaulu, North	nni	6b	500	Maluku province: 2 villages on Seram island, central north coast and inland, and Saleman bay.
561	Onin	oni	6b	500	West Papua province: Fakfak regency on north Bomberai peninsula in Berau bay south coast west to Wetin point, then southwest to Wirtopin bay; south coast facing Panjang island.
562	Ormu	orz	7	500	Papua province: Jayapura regency north coast, Ormu Besar and Ormu Kecil villages.
563	Taikat	aos	6b	500	Papua province: northeast border area south of Jayapura.
564	Tanahmerah	tcm	6b	500	West Papua province: Teluk Bintuni regency on north Bomberai peninsula, Bintuni bay, Bapai and Gondu river areas.
565	Tunggare	trt	6b	500	Papua province: Nabire regency, south Cendrawasih bay, Nabire town northeast past Ruwiami point.
566	Waris	wrs	6b	500	Papua province: Keerom regency, Waris sub-district.
567	Yahadian	ner	6b	500	West Papua province: Sorong Selatan regency, south Bird's Head along Maccluer bay.
568	Kaure	bpp	8a	450	Papua province: Aurina, Harna, Lereh, Masta, and Wes villages on Nawa river.
569	Sekar	skz	6b	450	West Papua province: Fakfak regency, Kokas area on northwest Bomberai peninsula coast; Ogar island.
570	Dabe	dbe	7	440	Papua province: Sarmi regency, Pantai Timur sub-district, Dabe village, Tor river valley north to coast.
571	Topoiyo	toy	8a	440	West Sulawesi province: Mamuju regency, Budong-Budong sub-district, inland along Budong-Budong river.
572	Sekak	lce	6b	420	Riau province; Riau Islands province; Bangka Belitung Islands province: Bangka Barat, Banka Tenga, and Bangka Selatan regencies, 2 coastal enclaves northern and southeast Bangka island; Belitung regency, western Belitung, Lepar, Liat, Mendanau, and other islands.
573	Bukat	bvk	6b	400	West Kalimantan province: northeast near Sarawak border, Kapuas river, 3 areas.
574	Demisa	dei	7	400	Papua province: Waropen Bawah sub-district, Botawa, Desawa, and Muyere villages; inland in northeast Canderawasih bay.
575	Kao	kax	8a	400	North Maluku province: Halmahera Utara regency; north Halmahera island on Kao bay area near Kao river mouth.
576	Kauwera	xau	6a	400	Papua province: middle Mamberamo river, north bank.
577	Kopkaka	opk	6b	400	Papua province: Jayawijaya regency, Kurima sub-district, Burungmakok and Siradala villages in lowlands; headwaters area, and Sirac river tributaries.
578	Manem	jet	6b	400	Papua province: Keerom regency, northeast border area, Kiba, Wembi, and Yeti villages.
579	Papasena	pas	6b	400	Papua province: Lakes plain area, lower Idenburg river.
580	Samarokena	tmj	6b	400	Papua province: Mamberamo Raya and Sarmi regencies, Karfasia, Maseb, Samarkena, and Tamaya villages on north coast, and inland east of Apauwar river and west of Sarmi.
581	Uruangnirin	urn	6b	400	West Papua province: Fak-Fak regency, Faur and Tuburuasa islands; southwest Bomberai peninsula mainland; possibly Karas island.
582	Yelmek	jel	8a	400	Papua province: Merauke regency, Bibikem, Dodalim, Wanam, and Woboyo villages; South coast, east Muli strait.
583	Keijar	kdy	8a	370	Papua province: Pacific coast east, north of Tor river mouth.
584	Punan Aput	pud	6b	370	North Kalimantan province: Malinau regency south of Kayan river.
585	Taje	pee	8b	370	Central Sulawesi province: Parigi Moutong regency, Ampibabo and Parigi Tengah sub-districts in Tomini bay.
586	Auye	auu	5	350	Papua province: Paniai regency, Napan sub-district; central highlands in Siriwo river area.
587	Awyi	auw	8a	350	Papua province: Keerom regency, Arso sub-district; northeast highland enclave near Papua New Guinea border.
588	Benggoi	bgy	8a	350	Maluku province: Werinama and Bula districts, Balakeo, Benggoi, and Lesa villages; Seram island, north Seram Sea coast.
589	Kadai	kzd	7	350	North Maluku province: Kepulauan Sula regency in Sula Islands, Molucca sea coast, Tjapaplulu strait area; Taliabu island, 2 east coast groups; west Mangole island coast east from Dofa; 2 small offshore islands.
590	Rahambuu	raz	7	350	Southeast Sulawesi province: Kolaka Utara regency, Pakue sub-district on upper Bone bay west coast, Batunong and north; some in South Sulawesi Selatan province.
591	Waru	wru	6b	350	Southeast Sulawesi province: Konawe Utara regency, Asera sub-district interior, Mopute village.
592	Yaur	jau	7	350	Papua province: Nabire regency, west Cenderawasih bay, Manggua point south to Wororomi.
593	Yeretuar	gop	7	350	Papua province: Nabire regency, lower Kwatisore bay; West Papua province: south Teluk Wondama regency, Wandamen peninsula.
594	Andio	bzb	7	335	Central Sulawesi province: Lamala sub-district, Tangeban and Tauge villages, peninsula east tip area.
595	Biga	bhc	6b	330	West Papua province: Sorong district, Biga village, on south Misool island.
596	Kompane	kvp	6b	330	Maluku province: Kepulauan Aru regency, Kompane village on Kongan island.
597	Serili	sve	8a	330	Maluku province: Babar island group, Papilewan town on northeast Marsela island.
598	Anus	auq	7	320	Papua province: Sarmi regency, Pulau Anus and Podena islands off north coast; coastal area east of Biri river.
599	Talondo’	tln	6b	320	West Sulawesi province: Mamuju regency, Bonehau sub-district, Bonehau village area.
600	Taloki	tlk	8a	310	Southeast Sulawesi province: Buton Utara regency; Kapontori and Wakorumba sub-districts, Maligano and Wakalambe villages on Buton island northwest coast.
601	Abinomn	bsa	6b	300	Papua province: Sarmi regency, Mamberamo Hulu sub-district. Lakes plain area, Baso river mouth at Idenburg river to headwaters in Foya mountains.
602	Bagusa	bqb	6a	300	Papua province: Jayapura regency, Mamberamo Tengah sub-district.
603	Bayono	byl	6a	300	Papua province: Asmat regency, Eilanden-Steenboom river area.
604	Diebroud	tbp	6b	300	Papua province: Sarmi regency, Mamberamo Hulu sub-district.
605	Dla	kbv	7	300	Papua province: Keerom regency, 13 villages on Papua New Guinea border.
606	Elseng	mrf	6b	300	Papua province: Jayapura and Keerom regencies, Abepura, Arso, Kemtuk Gresi, and Senggi sub-districts, Lake Sentani area, south, southwest.
607	Huaulu	hud	6b	300	Maluku province: Maluku Tengah regency, 10 villages on north Seram island, Salemen bay, south end near Opin town.
608	Komyandaret	kzv	6b	300	Papua province: Sungai river west bank headwaters.
609	Kwerba Mamberamo	xwr	6a	300	Papua province: Edifalen, Kwerba, and Marinafalen villages on Mamberamo river east bank and into highlands.
610	Mlap	kja	8b	300	Papua province: Jayapura regency, west of Lake Sentani.
611	Saweru	swr	6b	300	Papua Province: Serui Waropen regency, Yapen Selatan subdistrict, central Yapen island, an island south of Yapen island near Serui.
612	Trimuris	tip	6a	300	Papua province: Jayapura regency, Mamberamo Tengah sub-district on Mamberamo river east bank.
613	Warkay-Bipim	bgv	6b	300	Papua province: Asmat regency south coast, 3 villages near Otsianep and northeast near Bapiem.
614	Wauyai	wuy	7	300	West Papua province: Raja Ampat regency, Wauyai village on southeast coast.
615	Citak, Tamnim	tml	5	290	Papua province: Asmat and Mappi regencies, Epem, Tamnim, Wowi, and Zinak villages; Senggo town area.
616	Laiyolo	lji	6b	290	South Sulawesi province: Kepulauan Selayar regency, Barang-Barang, Laiyolo, Lowa, and other villages on Selayar island south tip.
617	Murkim	rmh	6a	290	Papua province: Pegunungan Bintang regency, Batom sub-district, Milki and Mot villages.
618	Fedan	pdn	7	280	Papua province: Sarmi regency, Bonggo sub-district, coastline and island off north coast of Biri river area.
619	Mariri	mqi	6a	280	Maluku province: 1 village southeast on Mairi island in Aru island group.
620	Perai	wet	6b	280	Maluku province: Maluku Barat Daya regency, Moning and Uhak villages on Wetar island northeast coast.
621	Biritai	bqq	6b	250	Papua province: Puncakjaya district, Biri village.
622	Burmeso	bzu	6a	250	Papua province: Mamberamo Raya regency, Mamberamo Tengah sub-district, 1 village on Middle Mamberamo river.
623	Dao	daz	6b	250	Papua province: Paniai regency, Napan sub-district; west central highlands along Dao river.
624	Emplawas	emw	8b	250	Maluku province: Maluku Barat Daya regency, Emplawas village, south Babar island.
625	Kirikiri	kiy	6a	250	Papua province: Dofu Wahuka and Paniai villages, west of Tariku and Kliki rivers’ confluence.
626	Kosare	kiq	6a	250	Papua province: west of Nawa and Idenburg rivers confluence, south of Jayapura city.
627	Legenyem	lcc	6a	250	West Papua province: Raja Ampat Islands, Waigeo island, Beo, Lempintol, and Wawiai villages in northwest main bay and south coast.
628	Meoswar	mvx	6b	250	West Papua province: Meoswar island, west Cenderawasih bay.
629	Mombum	mso	8a	250	Papua province: Kolopom island.
630	Sause	sao	6b	250	Papua Province: southwest of Sentani, northwest of Lereh, Ures, Mubararon, Sause-Bokoko, Witti-Yadow, Lidya, and Puaral villages.
631	Tofanma	tlg	6a	250	Papua province: Keerom regency, Senggi sub-district, most of Namla, Tofanma Dua, and Tofanma Satu villages in south Jayapura border area.
632	Viid	snu	8a	250	Papua province: Senggi village in border area south of Jayapura.
633	Wotu	wtw	7	250	South Sulawesi province: Luwu Timur regency, Wotu sub-district, Bawalipu and Lampenai villages in north Bone bay; coast near Kalaena river mouth.
634	Karas	kgv	8a	240	West Papua province: Antalisa and Mas villages on Karas island.
635	Kaptiau	kbi	8a	230	Papua province: Sarmi regency, Bonggo sub-district, Kaptiau village.
636	Molof	msl	6b	230	Papua province: 9 villages 100 km south of Jayapura city.
637	Zorop	wfg	7	230	Papua province: Keerom regency, Warlef village.
638	Kaiy	tcq	6b	220	Papua province: Kaiy and Kokou villages in Lakes plain area, lower Rouffaer river.
639	Lorang	lrn	6a	220	Maluku Province: Aru islands group, Koba island on northwest coast.
640	Tebi	dmu	8a	220	Papua province: Keerom regency, Affi, Dubu, and Jembatan Web villages’ border area.
641	Sowanda	sow	6b	210	Papua province: Keerom regency, northeast border area.
642	Beneraf	bnv	7	200	Papua province: Sarmi regency, Pantai Timur sub-district, Beneraf and part of Nenke village; north coast area east of Tor river mouth.
643	Erokwanas	erw	6b	200	West Papua province: Fakfak regency on Berau bay.
644	Jofotek-Bromnya	jbr	6b	200	Papua province: Sarmi regency, Bonggo sub-district, Srum village (Bromnya dialect); Pantai Timur sub-district, Biridua village (Jofotek dialect).
645	Kapauri	khp	6b	200	Papua province: Pagai village, Kamikaru and Magri hamlets on upper Idenburg river north bank.
646	Kehu	khh	6b	200	Papua province: Nabire regency, Sareba bay, Wapoga river in the foothills.
647	Momina	mmb	6b	200	Papua province: Jayawijaya regency, Samboka village on lowland hills at headwaters of Brazza and Einladen rivers.
648	Punan Merap	puc	6b	200	North Kalimantan province: Malinau regency on upper Malinau river.
649	Rasawa	rac	6b	200	Papua province: Waropen regency, Waropen Bawah sub-district, 2 villages on Cenderawasih bay east coast at Rombak river mouth.
650	Wares	wai	7	200	Papua province: Sarmi regency, Maweswares village on Biri river headwaters south side.
651	Yarsun	yrs	8a	200	Papua province: Sarmi regency, Bonggo sub-district.
652	Yoke	yki	6b	200	Papua province: Sarmi regency, Mantarbori village northeast of Rombebai lake, east of Mamberamo river.
653	Bedoanas	bed	7	180	West Papua province: Fakfak regency, Kokas sub-district; Bomberai peninsula.
654	Budong-Budong	bdx	6b	180	West Sulawesi province: Mamuju Tengah regency, Topoyo sub-district, Tabolang village; Makassar strait, Budong-Budong river area.
655	Kanum, Smärky	kxq	6b	170	Papua province: Kondo, Rawa Biru, Tomer, Tomerau, and Yanggandur villages, south point bordering Papua New Guinea.
656	Liabuku	lix	8a	160	Southeast Sulawesi province: Bungi district, Bau-Bau sub-district; south Buton island Waliabuku village area north of Bau-Bau.
657	Aputai	apx	8b	150	Maluku province: Maluku Barat Daya regency; Wetar island, Banda Sea coast, Ilputih village; Wetar strait coast, Lurang village.
658	Arguni	agf	6b	150	West Papua province: Fak-Fak district; Arguni island in Maccluer gulf off northwest coast, Bomberai peninsula.
659	Waritai	wbe	6b	150	Papua province: Tolikara regency; Taiyeve area south of Idenburg, Mamberama, and Rouffaer rivers’ confluence.
660	Punan Merah	puf	6b	140	East Kalimantan province: Kutai Barat regency on Mahakam river.
661	Maklew	mgf	6b	120	Papua province: Merauke regency, Welbuti village; south coast area.
662	Obokuitai	afz	6b	120	Papua province: Mamberamo Raya regency, Obogwi village on Lakes plain north of Rouffaer river.
663	Towei	ttn	8a	120	Papua province: Pegunungan Bintang regency, Towe Hitam village.
664	Usku	ulf	8a	110	Papua province: Keerom regency, Usku village west of Sobger river.
665	Awbono	awh	6b	100	Papua province: Jayawijaya regency; Modera river area.
666	Burate	bti	7	100	Papua province: Yapen Waropen regency, Waropen Bawah sub-district, 1 village near Wapoga river mouth.
667	Diuwe	diy	6b	100	Papua province: Asmat regency, southeast of Wamena city.
668	Kanum, Ngkâlmpw	kcd	6b	100	Papua province: Merauke regency, Onggaya, Tomer, and Yanggandur villages south along Papua New Guinea border.
669	Kanum, Sota	krz	6a	100	Papua province: Merauke regency, Sota village; south, bordering Papua New Guinea.
670	Kofei	kpi	7	100	Papua province: Mamberamo Raya and Waropen regencies; east side of Cendrawasih bay.
671	Kui	kvd	6b	100	East Nusa Tenggara province: Alor regency. Lerabaing and Buraga villages on Alor island (Kui dialect); Kapebang and Sibera villages in Kalabahi bay (Batulolong dialect).
672	Kwer	kwr	6b	100	Papua province: Jayawijaya regency, Kurima sub-district, Kwer village; lowlands area at Sirac river headwaters.
673	Sauri	srt	6b	100	Papua province: Waropen regency, Sauri-Sirami village on east Cenderawasih bay.
674	Tangko	tkx	6b	100	Papua province: Kawemaot village.
675	Tefaro	tfo	6b	100	Papua province: Demba and Tefaro villages in east Cenderawasih bay.
676	Tobati	tti	8b	100	Papua province: Enggros, Entrop, Kota Raja, Tanah Hitam, and Tobati villages on Jayapura bay.
677	Tomadino	tdi	8a	100	Central Sulawesi province: Bungku Tengah sub-district, Sakita village on Tolo bay east coast.
678	Mer	mnu	6b	85	Papua province: Nabire regency; West Papua province: Kaimana and Teluk Wondama regencies on central Bird's Head, headwaters of Uremo and Wosimi rivers.
679	Itik	itx	6b	80	Papua province: Sarmi regency, north coast on upper Biri river.
680	Doutai	tds	7	70	Papua province: Toli-Dou village southwest of Taiyeve town.
681	Yeresiam	ire	7	70	Papua province: Nabire regency, south Cenderawasih bay, Yamur lake area; West Papua province: Kaimana regency.
682	Baras	brs	8a	64	West Sulawesi province: Mamuju Utara regency, Baras sub-district, in and north of Bambaloka village, Karossa sub-district, Salubiro village.
683	Dineor	mrx	8a	55	Papua province: Sarmi regency on north coast, Walckenaer bay area.
684	Amahai	amq	8b	50	Maluku province: Maluku Tengah regency, 4 villages; Seram island in Elpaputih bay near Masohi town.
685	Kayupulau	kzu	8a	50	Papua province: Kota Jayapura city and island in Jayapura harbor.
686	Lolak	llq	8b	50	North Sulawesi province: Bolaang Mongondow regency, Lolak sub-district, Lolak, Mongkoinit, Mongkoinit Barat, Tombolango, and Motabang villages.
687	Morori	mok	8b	50	Papua province: south coast border area.
688	Paku	pku	8a	50	Central Kalimantan province: East Barito regency, Paku district, Bantei Napu, Kalamus, Tampa, and Tarinsing villages.
689	Paulohi	plh	8b	50	Maluku province: Maluku Tengah regency, Kecamatan and Amahai villages on Seram island, Elpaputih bay west shore.
690	Salas	sgu	8b	50	Maluku province: Seram Bagian Timur regency, Gunung village on Seram island northeast coast.
691	Burumakok	aip	8b	40	Papua province: Pegunungan Bintang regency, Kurima sub-district, Burumakok village.
692	Ibu	ibu	8b	35	North Maluku province: Halmahera Barat regency, Gamlamo and Gamici villages on north Halmahera island, Iboe river mouth.
693	Mor	moq	8a	30	West Papua province: Fakfak regency on northwest Bomberai peninsula, Berau bay inland.
694	Namla	naa	8b	30	Papua province: Keerom regency, Senggi sub-district, Namla village.
695	Massep	mvs	8b	25	Papua province: Sarmi regency, north coast; also west of Sarmi near Apauwer river.
696	Kalao	kly	7	22	South Sulawesi province: Kepulauan Selayar regency, Selayar islands; east Kalao island.
697	Kembra	xkw	8a	20	Papua province: Jayawijaya regency, Okbibab sub-district.
698	Mander	mqr	8b	20	Papua province: Sarmi regency, 2 areas on upper Tor river tributary of upper Bu river.
699	Kwerisa	kkb	8b	15	Papua province: Mamberamo Raya regency, lower Rouffaer river.
700	Liki	lio	8a	11	Papua province: Sarmi regency, Sarmi sub-district, Liki and Nirumoar islands.
701	Masimasi	ism	8b	10	Papua province: Sarmi regency, Pantai Timur sub-district, Masi-Masi island off north coast.
702	As	asz	8b	6	West Papua province: Sorong regency, Asbaken and Sorong.
703	Malay, Bacanese	btj	8b	6	North Maluku province: at least 2 villages on Bacan and Mandioli islands.
704	Kanum, Bädi	khd	8b	5	Papua province: Merauke regency, Onggaya village; south coast border area.
705	Woria	wor	8b	5	Papua province: Waropen regency, Botawa village; Sanoringga river mouth to interior, and northeast.
706	Awera	awr	9	0	Papua province: Waropen regency, Waropen Bawah sub-district,1 village; east Cenderawasih bay at Wapoga river mouth.
707	Duriankere	dbn	10	0	West Papua province: one island between Salawati island and Bird's Head west end.
708	Dusner	dsn	9	0	West Papua province: Teluk Wondama regency.
709	Hoti	hti	10	0	Maluku province: east Seram island.
710	Hukumina	huw	10	0	Maluku province: Hukumina, Palumata, and Tomahu districts on northwest Buru island.
711	Hulung	huk	10	0	Maluku province: Seram Bagian Barat regency, Hulung village on west Seram island.
712	Iha Based Pidgin	ihb	9	0	West Papua province: Fak Fak regency, Fak Fak Selantan area on Bomberai peninsula south coast.
713	Javindo	jvd	9	0	Central Java province: south.
714	Kamarian	kzx	9	0	Maluku province: Seram Bagian Barat regency, southwest Seram island inland from Ceram strait, Haruku, and Sapura islands.
715	Kayeli	kzl	9	0	Maluku province: Buru regency, northeast Buru island, Kayeli bay area.
716	Loun	lox	10	0	Maluku province: Maluku Tengah regency, north central Seram island.
717	Mapia	mpy	10	0	West Papua province: Manokwari regency, Mapia islands.
718	Moksela	vms	10	0	Maluku province: east Buru island near Kayeli.
719	Naka’ela	nae	10	0	Maluku province: Seram Bagian Barat regency, Taniwel village on Seram island.
720	Nila	nil	10	0	Maluku province: south central Seram island, 6 villages.
721	Nusa Laut	nul	9	0	Maluku province: Maluku Tengah regency, Lease islands and Nusa Laut island in Titawai village.
722	Onin Based Pidgin	onx	9	0	West Papua province: Fak Fak regency, Maruntiri area on Onin peninsula and inland highlands.
723	Ponosakan	pns	9	0	North Sulawesi province: Belang town area.
724	Saponi	spi	10	0	Papua province: Waropen regency, Waropen Bawah sub-district, Botawa village.
725	Serua	srw	10	0	Maluku province: south central Seram island, 4 villages.
726	Tambora	xxt	10	0	West Nusa Tenggara province: central Sumbawa.
727	Tandia	tni	9	0	Papua province: Nabire regency, Bird's Head neck area south of Wandamen peninsula and Wohsimi river; possibly Papua Barat province.
728	Te’un	tve	10	0	Maluku province: 4 villages on central and south central Seram island.
729	Ternateño	tmg	10	0	North Maluku province: Kota Ternate city on Ternate island.
730	Bidayuh, Bau	sne	6b	Unlisted	West Kalimantan: Bengkayang regency, Jagoi Babang sub-district.
731	Bidayuh, Bukar-Sadong	sdo	6a	Unlisted	West Kalimantan province: Sanggau and Sintang regencies; Mount Cemaru, near Sarawak border.
732	Chinese, Min Dong	cdo	8b	Unlisted	Bali and Java provinces: scattered throughout.
733	Petjo	pey	8b	Unlisted	Jakarta Special Capital Region.
734	Salawati	xmx	7	Unlisted	West Papua province: Raja Ampat regency, northwest Salawati island.
