= Bambam language =

Austronesian language spoken in Sulawesi, Indonesia

Bambam
- Bambang
- Native to: Indonesia
- Region: Sulawesi
- Native speakers: 40,000 (2010)
- Language family: Austronesian: Malayo-Polynesian; South Sulawesi; Northern; Pitu Ulunna Salu; Bambam

Language codes
- ISO 639-3: ptu
- Glottolog: bamb1270

Bambam (Bambang) is an Austronesian language of West Sulawesi, Indonesia. It is spoken in the Mambi, Mehalaan, East Rantebulahan, and Bambang districts of Mamasa Regency, and in the Matangnga district of Polewali Mandar Regency. Together with Aralle-Tabulahan, Ulumanda', Pannei and Dakka, Bambam belongs to the Pitu Ulunna Salu languages, which form a subbranch within the Northern branch of the South Sulawesi subgroup.

== Phonology ==
Vowel phonemes
	Front	Back
Close	i	u
Mid	e	o
Open/Near-open	æ (Note: /æ/ is written ⟨ä⟩.)	ɑ

Consonant phonemes
		Labial	Alveolar	Postalveolar	Velar	Glottal
Stop/ Affricate	voiceless	p	t		k	(ʔ) (Note: /k/ is realized as [ʔ] in morpheme-final position, e.g. änäk /ænæk/ [ænæʔ] 'child'.)
Stop/ Affricate	voiced	b	d	d͡ʒ	g	
Fricative		β (Note: /β/ only occurs in certain dialects, the prestige variant merges it with /b/)	s			h
Nasal		m	n		ŋ	
Lateral			l			
