= Mamuju =

Mamuju may refer to:

- Mamuju (city), capital of West Sulawesi, Indonesia
- Mamuju Regency, subdistrict of West Sulawesi
- Mamuju language, spoken in Sulawesi, Indonesia
