= Malimpung language =

Austronesian language spoken in Sulawesi, Indonesia

Malimpung
- Native to: Indonesia
- Region: Sulawesi
- Native speakers: (5,000 cited 1986)
- Language family: Austronesian: Malayo-Polynesian; South Sulawesi; Northern; Massenrempulu; Malimpung

Language codes
- ISO 639-3: mli
- Glottolog: mali1283

Malimpung is a language spoken by around 5,000 people in South Sulawesi, Indonesia. It belongs to the Northern branch of the South Sulawesi subgroup, and is closely related to Duri, Enrekang, and Maiwa.
