= Pitu =

Pitu may refer to:

== People ==
- Adrian Pitu (born 1975), Romanian football player
- Alexi Pitu (born 2002), Romanian football player
- Kuzman Josifovski Pitu (1915–1944), Macedonian communist
- Pitu (footballer), Spanish football player
- Pitu Guli (1865–1903), Aromanian revolutionary

== Places ==
- Pitu Airport, Indonesia

== Other ==
- Pitu or Bambam language
- Pitú, Brazilian cachaça brand
