= Taeʼ language =

Austronesian language spoken in Sulawesi, Indonesia

Taeʼ
- Basa Taeʼ
- Native to: Indonesia
- Region: South Sulawesi
- Ethnicity: Toala; Luwu
- Native speakers: 270,000 (2010 census)
- Language family: Austronesian: Malayo-Polynesian; South Sulawesi; Northern; Toraja; Taeʼ
- Dialects: Northeast Luwu; South Luwu; Rongkong; Bua
- Writing system: Latin

Language codes
- ISO 639-3: rob
- Glottolog: taee1237
- Distribution of the Tae' language in the Toraja language group in South Sulawesi

Taeʼ is a language spoken in South Sulawesi, Indonesia. It belongs to the Austronesian language family and is one of the languages of the ten tribes that inhabit the Tana Luwu region of South Sulawesi. The Taeʼ language is used by most of the inhabitants of the three regencies of Tana Luwu (Luwu Regency, North Luwu Regency, and East Luwu Regency), and the city of Palopo. Taeʼ is part of the South Sulawesi group of languages. It is closely related to Toraja, and more distantly to Mandar, Massenrempulu, and Mamuju. Taeʼ is used as a lingua franca from south of the border with Buriko Wajo Regency to Malili East Luwu Regency, as well as in Tana Toraja and Massenrempulu.

== Naming ==
Other names for the Tae’ language include Toala’, Luwu, East Toraja, Sada, Toware, Sangngalla’, Tae’-Tae’, the Rongkong dialect, or Rongkong Kanandede. People within Tanah Luwu itself refer to the language differently depending on the region. In the southern part of Luwu (specifically Luwu Regency), the dominant term is *Bahasa Luwu'*. The term *Tae'* is also used—though less widely than in the north—with people in the southern areas often preferring to reduplicate the term as *Tae'-Tae'*.

This variation in naming—between *Tae'* and *Luwu'*—is further complicated by the fact that the term *Luwu'* is sometimes used to refer to the Bugis in Tana-Luwu (particularly those originating from the north), whereas the term used in the south is simply *Bugis*. According to Vail, using *Tae'* as the overarching term for this group of language dialects is considered appropriate.

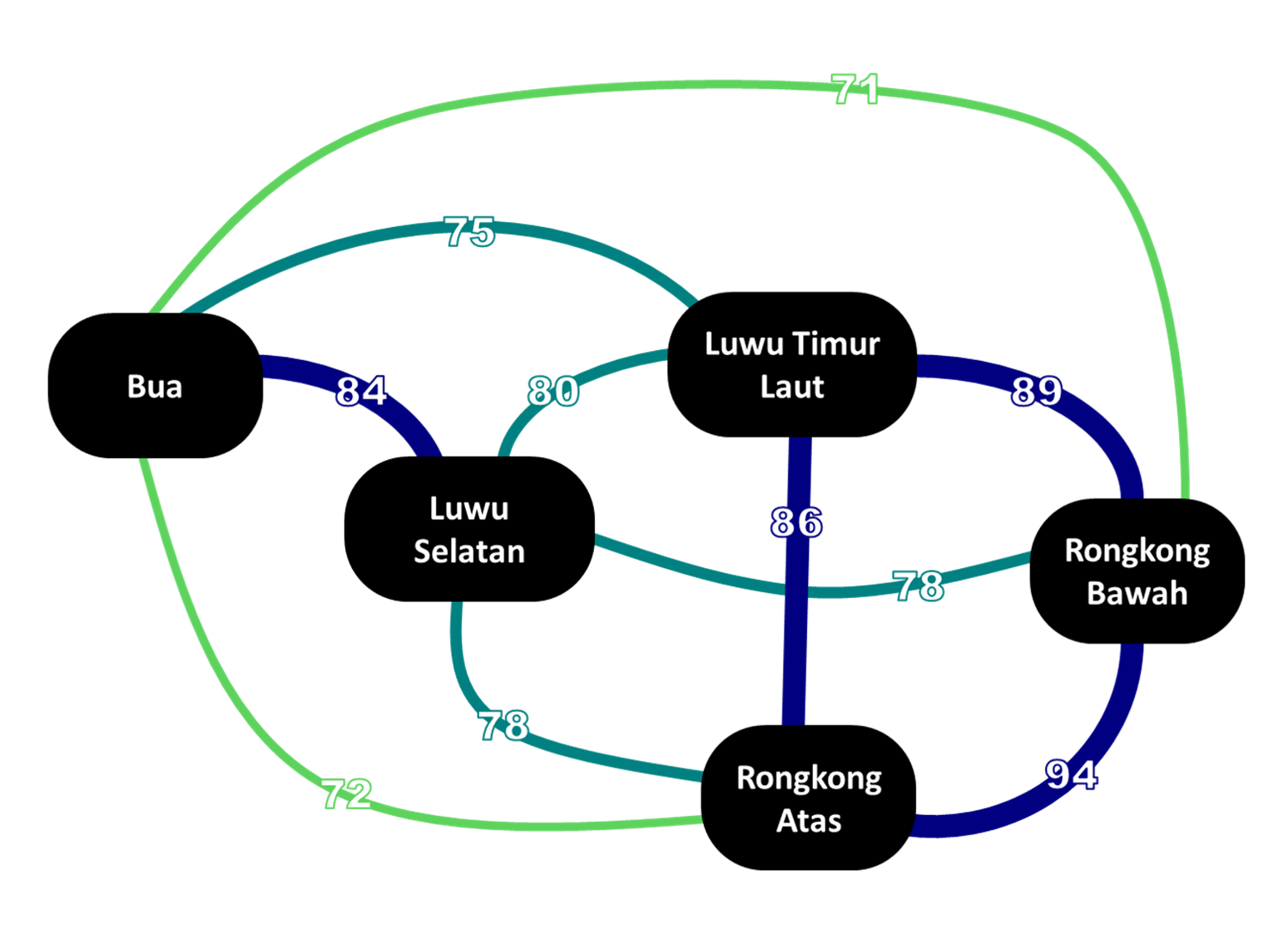
Diagram showing the relationships between language varieties/dialects within the Tae' language based on lexical similarity percentages.

== Classification ==
=== Affiliation ===
The Tae' language is part of the Austronesian language family, specifically the South Sulawesi branch of the Malayo-Polynesian subfamily; it belongs to the northern group, which also includes the Toraja-Sa'dan, Mamasa, and Kalumpang languages. Tae' is a language of South Sulawesi and shares similarities with Toraja-Sa'dan, particularly in terms of lexicon. Lexical similarity stands at 92% among its own dialects (Rongkong, Northeast Luwu, South Luwu, Bua, Toala', Palili') and 80% with Toraja-Sa'dan.

=== Dialects ===
The Tae' language has several dialects, including:

- Bua (spoken in Bua, Ponrang, Bupon, and parts of Palopo)
- Northeast Luwu (spoken in Bone-Bone)
- South Luwu (spoken in Belopa, Bajo, Suli, and surrounding areas)
- Rongkong (spoken in Rongkong, Baebunta, Sabbang, Masamba, and surrounding areas)

The following table shows vocabulary differences among Tae' dialects:

Vocabulary Differences in Tae' (+Toraja, Duri)
| Language | Dialect | Go | Leg/Foot | Bathe | Morning | Banana | Vegetable | Above/Up | Below/Down | Sand | Intestine | Red |
|---|---|---|---|---|---|---|---|---|---|---|---|---|
| Tae' | Bua | ingka | aje | minjio | makale | loka | bukkaju | jao | jiong | bone | parru | maeja |
| Tae' | South Luwu | manjo | aje | minjio | makale | punti | utang | jao | jiong | kassi | parru | mararang |
| Tae' | Northeast Luwu | lao | * | * | * | * | * | * | * | * | * | |
| Tae' | Rongkong | vale/wale | lettek | mindio | melambi | putti | * | yao | * | * | isi tambuk | mararang |
| Duri language | | male | aje | menjio | makale | punti | utan | jao | jiong | kassiq | tambuk | malea |
| Toraja-Sa'dan language | | male | lentek | mendioq | melambiq | punti | utan | dao | diong | kassiq | tambuk | mararang |

== Demographics and distribution ==
The people of Luwu currently remain active in communicating using the Tae’ language. Tae’ is most widely spoken in Luwu Regency and Palopo City. Conversely, usage of the Tae’ language is less common in North Luwu Regency and East Luwu Regency due to the presence of migrants who speak other regional languages—such as Bugis, Wotu, Balinese, Bawa, Sundanese, and others. In addition to these regional languages, Indonesian is also used for communication, particularly in the many immigrant settlements inhabited by people from outside the island of Sulawesi. There are approximately 250,000 speakers of this language (1992 SIL). *Ethnologue* classifies the Tae' language as Level 5 (Developing) on the EGIDS scale, indicating that the language is still commonly used in face-to-face conversation across all generations and its situation is sustainable.

== Phonology ==
=== Vocals ===
Tae' language has five types of phoneme vowels, namely /a e i u o/.

1. Vowels
| | Front | Middle | Behind |
|---|---|---|---|
| Closed | i | | u |
| Currently | e | | o |
| Open | | a | |

=== Consonants ===
The Tae' language has eighteen types of phonemes consonants.

2. Consonant
| | | Labial | Dental/ alveolar | Palatal | Velar | Glottal |
|---|---|---|---|---|---|---|
| Nasal | | m | n | ɲ ⟨ny⟩ | ŋ ⟨ng⟩ | |
| Inhibit | voiceless | p | t | c | k | ʔ ⟨ʼ⟩ |
| Inhibit | voiced | b | d | ɟ ⟨j⟩ | ɡ | |
| Hissing | | | s | | | |
| Lateral | | | l | | | |
| Vibrating | | | r | | | |
| Semivocal | | | | j ⟨y⟩ | w | |

== Grammar ==
=== Pronouns ===
The Tae’ language features four types of pronominal forms: proclitics, enclitics, possessive enclitics, and free pronouns. Tae’ exhibits morphological ergativity.

4. Personal pronouns
| Gloss | Free pronouns (PRO) | Proclitic (ERG) | Enclitic (ABS) | Owned bookmark (POSS) |
|---|---|---|---|---|
| 1SG | me | my= | =naʼ | ≡ku |
| 1PL EXCL | we | ki= | =right | ≡ta |
| 1PL INCL/2POL | us | ta= | =ki | ≡ta |
| 2FAM | iko | mu= | =ko/=kun | ≡mu |
| 3 | he | na= | =i | ≡na |

sule =i ambe' ≡ku
home =3 father ≡1.POSS
He (my father) is home.
