= Northern South Sulawesi languages =

Subgroup of the Austronesian language family

Northern South Sulawesi
- Geographic distribution: Indonesia (Sulawesi)
- Linguistic classification: Austronesian: Malayo-Polynesian; South Sulawesi; Northern South Sulawesi
- Subdivisions: Mandar; Mamuju; Pitu Ulunna Salu; Massenrempulu; Toraja

Language codes
- Glottolog: nort2894
- Map showing the distribution of the South Sulawesi languages in Sulawesi and Kalimantan, Northern South Sulawesi languages is in red-based colour.

The Northern South Sulawesi languages are a subgroup of the South Sulawesi languages in the Austronesian language family. They are spoken in an area that stretches from the western peninsula of Sulawesi to the Gulf of Bone, Indonesia. Its most prominent members are Mandar and Toraja.

== Classification ==
Northern South Sulawesi is divided into five branches:

- Mandar
- Mamuju
- Pitu Ulunna Salu
  - Aralle-Tabulahan
  - Bambam
  - Dakka
  - Pannei
  - Ulumanda’
- Massenrempulu
  - Duri
  - Enrekang
  - Maiwa
  - Malimpung
- Toraja
  - Kalumpang
  - Mamasa (including Pattae')
  - Tae’
  - Talondo’
  - Toraja-Sa’dan

The Pitu Ulunna Salu, Massenrempulu and Toraja branches were already recognized by van der Veen (1929) as distinct units.

== See also ==
- Languages of Sulawesi
- Languages of Indonesia
