= Maiwa language (Sulawesi) =

Austronesian language spoken in Sulawesi, Indonesia

Maiwa
- Native to: Indonesia
- Region: Sulawesi
- Ethnicity: Maiwa, Massenrempulu
- Native speakers: (50,000 cited 1990)
- Language family: Austronesian: Malayo-Polynesian; South Sulawesi; Northern; Massenrempulu; Maiwa

Language codes
- ISO 639-3: wmm
- Glottolog: maiw1250

Maiwa is an Austronesian language spoken by around 50,000 people in South Sulawesi, Indonesia. It belongs to the Northern branch of the South Sulawesi subgroup, and is closely related to Duri, Enrekang and Malimpung.
