= South Sulawesi languages =

Subgroup of the Austronesian language family

South Sulawesi
- Geographic distribution: Indonesia (Sulawesi, West Kalimantan)
- Linguistic classification: Austronesian: Malayo-Polynesian; South Sulawesi
- Proto-language: Proto-South Sulawesi
- Subdivisions: Bugis–Tamanic; Makassaric; Lemolang; Seko; Northern

Language codes
- Glottolog: sout2923
- Map showing the distribution of the South Sulawesi languages in Sulawesi and Kalimantan

The South Sulawesi languages are a subgroup of the Austronesian language family. They are primarily spoken in the Indonesian provinces of South Sulawesi and West Sulawesi, with a small outlying pocket in West Kalimantan (Tamanic).

== Subgrouping ==
=== Internal classification ===
This classification follows Grimes & Grimes (1987) and the Ethnologue.

- South Sulawesi
  - Bugis
    - Buginese
      - Buginese
      - Campalagian
    - Tamanic
      - Embaloh
      - Taman
  - Makassaric
    - Bentong
    - Coastal Konjo
    - Highland Konjo
    - Makassar
    - Selayar
  - Seko
    - Budong-Budong
    - Panasuan
    - Seko Padang
    - Seko Tengah
  - Lemolang
  - Northern
    - Mamuju
    - Mandar
    - Massenrempulu
      - Duri
      - Enrekang
      - Maiwa
      - Malimpung
    - Pitu Ulunna Salu
      - Aralle-Tabulahan
      - Dakka
      - Pannei
      - Bambam
      - Ulumanda’
    - Toraja
      - Kalumpang
      - Tae’
      - Mamasa (including Pattae', Central Mamasa, and Northern Mamasa)
      - Toraja-Sa’dan
      - Talondo’

The position of the Tamanic languages, spoken in West Borneo, was unclear until the end of the last century. The Dutch linguist K.A. Adelaar showed that they are especially close to Buginese and thus can be included in the South Sulawesi subgroup.

Zobel (2020) also classifies the Badaic languages with Seko as part of a Seko–Badaic group within the South Sulawesi branch.

Notes: Italic writing indicates it is considered a dialect and not a separate language.

=== Position within Austronesian ===
At the current state of research, the South Sulawesi languages are considered to make up a primary branch of the Malayo-Polynesian subgroup within the Austronesian language family.

== South Sulawesi influence in Malagasy ==
Adelaar (1995) suggested that the vocabulary of Malagasy, next to its basic stratum inherited from Barito and loanwords from Malay, also contains many words that are of South Sulawesi origin. Further evidence was presented by Blench (2018).

== Reconstruction ==
Proto-South Sulawesi
- Reconstruction of: South Sulawesi languages
- Region: Sulawesi
- Reconstructed ancestors: Proto-Austronesian: Proto-Malayo-Polynesian

Proto-South Sulawesi (PSS) has been reconstructed by Mills (1975a, 1975b).

=== Phonology ===
==== Vowels ====
	Front	Central	Back
Close	*i	*ɨ	*u
Mid	*e		*o
Open		*a	

The Proto-South-Sulawesi vowel *ɨ is a reflex of Proto-Malayo-Polynesian (PMP) *ə. It is only preserved in Buginese, in all other languages it mostly became a (but under certain circumstances also i, u, e, and rarely o).

The main sources of the mid vowels are PMP *-iq/*-ay, which became *e, and *-uq/*-aw, which became *o, e.g.

PMP *putiq > PSS *pute 'white'
PMP *matay > PSS *mate 'dead'
PMP *suluq > PSS *sulo 'torch'
PMP *pisaw > PSS *piso 'knife'

==== Consonants ====
		Bilabial	Alveolar	Palatal	Velar
Stop	voiceless	*p	*t	*c	*k
Stop	voiced	*b	*d	*j	*g
Fricative	voiceless		*s		
Fricative	voiced			*z	*ɣ
Nasal		*m	*n	*ñ	*ŋ
Lateral			*l		
Trill			*r		
Approximant		*w		*y	

The velar fricative *ɣ only appears in final position as a reflex of PMP *R, while *z only is found in medial position as a reflex of PMP *j.

== See also ==
- Languages of Sulawesi
- Celebic languages
