= Kalumpang language =

Language

Kalumpang
- Makki
- Native to: Indonesia
- Region: West Sulawesi
- Native speakers: 20,000 (2012)
- Language family: Austronesian: Malayo-Polynesian; South Sulawesi; Northern; Toraja; Kalumpang
- Dialects: Bone Hau; Karataun; Mablei; Mangki

Language codes
- ISO 639-3: kli
- Glottolog: kalu1247

Kalumpang is an Austronesian dialect cluster of Sulawesi, Indonesia. Its dialects are only slightly closer to each other than they are to related languages.
