= Campalagian language =

Austronesian language

Campalagian
- Koneq-koneq'e
- Native to: Indonesia
- Region: West Sulawesi
- Native speakers: 3,000 (2010)
- Language family: Austronesian: Malayo-Polynesian; South Sulawesi; Bugis–Tamanic; Bugis; Campalagian

Language codes
- ISO 639-3: cml
- Glottolog: camp1262

Campalagian (Koneq-Koneq'e) is an Austronesian language spoken in West Sulawesi, Indonesia. It is closely related to Bugis.
