= Aralle-Tabulahan language =

Austronesian language spoken in Sulawesi, Indonesia

Aralle-Tabulahan
- Ahalle
- Native to: Indonesia
- Region: West Sulawesi
- Native speakers: 30,000 (2010 census)
- Language family: Austronesian: Malayo-Polynesian; South Sulawesi; Northern; Pitu Ulunna Salu; Aralle-Tabulahan
- Dialects: Aralle; Tabulahan; Mambi

Language codes
- ISO 639-3: atq
- Glottolog: aral1243

Aralle-Tabulahan is an Austronesian language that belongs to the South Sulawesi subgroup. It is spoken in Mamasa Regency, West Sulawesi, Indonesia.

== Dialects ==
Aralle-Tabulahan has three major dialects: Aralle, Tabulahan, and Mambi. The Mambi dialect is often regarded as the most divergent of the three dialects and is seen as at the centre of spectrum between the Aralle and Tabulahan dialects and the related Bambam language.
