= Limola language =

Austronesian language spoken in Sulawesi, Indonesia

Limola
- Lemolang
- Native to: Indonesia
- Region: Sulawesi
- Native speakers: (2,000 cited 1991)
- Language family: Austronesian: Malayo-Polynesian; South Sulawesi; Seko–Badaic; Badaic; Limola

Language codes
- ISO 639-3: ley
- Glottolog: lemo1243
- ELP: Lemolang

Limola (also called Lemolang) is an Austronesian language of Sulawesi, Indonesia. It is spoken in two villages in North Luwu Regency, South Sulawesi. It is classified as a member of the Badaic subgroup of the South Sulawesi languages.
