= Talondoʼ language =

Austronesian language spoken in Sulawesi, Indonesia

Talondoʼ
- Native to: Indonesia
- Region: West Sulawesi
- Ethnicity: Talondo’
- Native speakers: 1,200 (2011)
- Language family: Austronesian: Malayo-Polynesian; South Sulawesi; Northern; Toraja; Talondoʼ

Language codes
- ISO 639-3: tln
- Glottolog: talo1251
- ELP: Talondo'

Talondoʼ is an endangered Austronesian language spoken in West Sulawesi, Indonesia. Its speakers live in Talondo Kondo village in Mamuju Regency and are ethnically referred to as the Talondo’ people.
