= Ulumandaʼ language =

Language spoken on Sulawesi, Indonesia

Ulumandaʼ
- Native to: Indonesia
- Region: Sulawesi
- Native speakers: (30,000 cited 1986)
- Language family: Austronesian: Malayo-Polynesian; South Sulawesi; Northern; Pitu Ulunna Salu; Ulumandaʼ

Language codes
- ISO 639-3: ulm
- Glottolog: ulum1237

Ulumandaʼ is an Austronesian language of West Sulawesi, Indonesia. It is nearly intelligible with other Pitu Ulunna Salu languages, but Ulumanda' is distinguished by an unusual series of front vowels.

== Phonology ==
The vowel inventory of Ulumandaʼ is as follows:

Vowels of Ulumandaʼ according to Zobel (2018)
	Front	Back
Close	i y	u
Mid	e ø	o
Open	æ	ɑ

The attested consonant inventory is as follows:

Consonants attested in the vocabulary of Smith (1993)
		Labial	Alveolar	Dorsal	Glottal
Plosive	voiceless	p	t	k	ʔ
Plosive	voiced	b	d	ɡ	
Nasal		m	n	ŋ	
Fricative			s		h
Trill			r		
Lateral			l		
Approximant				j	

=== Vowel harmony ===
Ulumandaʼ is unusual among the Austronesian languages of Sulawesi for featuring a vowel harmony opposition of front vowels /æ, ø, y/ to corresponding back vowels /ɑ, o, u/ comparable to that of the Uralic languages. Originally, fronted vowels arose from the fronting of back vowels before syllable-final velar consonants *k and *ŋ, but were phonemicized in final syllables when word-final *-m and *-n merged with *ŋ to result in -ŋ but did not front a preceding back vowel unlike original *-ŋ. These fronted vowels then fronted any other back vowels in a word except if a neutral vowel like *e or *i intervened between the vowels. Unlike the Uralic languages, the vowel harmony is regressive instead of progressive.

A contrastive pair includes /uraŋ/ "person" vs. /uræŋ/ [yræŋ] "shrimp".
