= Toraja-Saʼdan language =

Austronesian language spoken in Sulawesi, Indonesia

Toraja-Saʼdan
- South Toraja
- Sa’dan, Sa’dansche, Sadan, Sadang, Ta’e, Tae’, Toradja, Toraja
- Native to: Indonesia
- Region: South Sulawesi; West Sulawesi
- Ethnicity: Torajan
- Native speakers: 590,000 (2010 census)
- Language family: Austronesian: Malayo-Polynesian; South Sulawesi; Northern; Toraja; Toraja-Saʼdan
- Dialects: Makale; Rantepao; West Toraja; South Toraja (Luwu)
- Writing system: Latin

Language codes
- ISO 639-3: sda
- Glottolog: tora1261
- Map showing the distribution of the South Sulawesi languages in Sulawesi and Kalimantan, Toraja-Sa'dan language in number 29.

Toraja-Saʼdan (also Toraja, Saʼdan, South Toraja) is an Austronesian language spoken in South Sulawesi and West Sulawesi, Indonesia by the Toraja people. It shares the name Taeʼ with East Toraja. Most of the Toraja language mapping was done by Dutch missionaries working in Sulawesi, such as Nicolaus Adriani and Hendrik van der Veen.

== Phonology ==
Vowels
| | Front | Central | Back |
|---|---|---|---|
| Close | i | | u |
| Mid | e | | o |
| Open | | a | |

Consonants
| | | Labial | Alveolar | Palatal | Velar | Glottal |
|---|---|---|---|---|---|---|
| Nasal | | m | n | | ŋ | |
| Plosive/ Affricate | voiceless | p | t | (tʃ) | k | ʔ |
| Plosive/ Affricate | voiced | b | d | (dʒ) | ɡ | |
| Fricative | | | s | | | (h) |
| Rhotic | | | r | | | |
| Lateral | | | l | | | |
| Approximant | | w | | j | | |

Sounds [tʃ, dʒ] are heard from Indonesian loanwords. /h/ only rarely occurs.

In final position, only /n/, /ŋ/, /k/ and /ʔ/ can occur.

== Alphabet ==
=== Vocals ===
| A | I | U | E | Oh |

=== Consonants ===
| B | C | D | G | H | J | K | L | M | N | P | R | T | W | Y |

Diphthong

- Ng

Quotation marks

- '

== Numbers ==
| Indonesian | Toraja |
|---|---|
| Nol (Zero) | |
| Satu (One) | Misa' |
| Dua (Two) | Da'dua |
| Tiga (Three) | Tallu |
| Empat (Four) | A'pa' |
| Lima (Five) | Lima |
| Enam (Six) | Annan |
| Tujuh (Seven) | Pitu |
| Delapan (Eight) | Karua |
| Sembilan (Nine) | Kasera |
| Sepuluh (Ten) | Sangpulo |
| Sebelas (Eleven) | Sangpulo misa' |
| Dua belas (Twelve) | Sangpulo da'dua |
| Dua puluh (Twenty) | Duang pulo |
| Tiga puluh (Thirty) | Tallung pulo |
| Empat puluh (Forty) | Patang pulo |
| Lima puluh (Fifty) | Limang pulo |
| Enam puluh (Sixty) | Annan pulo |
| Tujuh puluh (Seventy) | Pitung pulo |
| Delapan puluh (Eighty) | Karuang pulo |
| Sembilan puluh (Ninety) | Kaserang pulo |
| Seratus (One hundred) | Saratu' |
| Seribu (One thousand) | Sang sa'bu |

== Dialects ==
The Toraja-Sa'dan language has several dialects, including:

- Makale (Tallulembangna)
- Rantepao (Kesu’, North Toraja)
- West Toraja (Mappa-Pana)
- South Toraja (Luwu, Kamanre, Bastem, Latimojong)
