= Pannei language =

Austronesian language spoken in Sulawesi, Indonesia

Pannei
- Native to: Indonesia
- Region: South Sulawesi
- Native speakers: (9,000 cited 1983)
- Language family: Austronesian: Malayo-Polynesian; South Sulawesi; Northern; Pitu Ulunna Salu; Pannei

Language codes
- ISO 639-3: pnc
- Glottolog: pann1239

Pannei is an Austronesian language of Sulawesi, Indonesia. It is nearly intelligible with other Pitu Ulunna Salu languages.
