= Dakka language =

Austronesian language spoken in Sulawesi, Indonesia

Dakka
- Native to: Indonesia
- Region: West Sulawesi
- Ethnicity: Dakka
- Native speakers: 1,000 (2010)
- Language family: Austronesian: Malayo-Polynesian; South Sulawesi; Northern; Pitu Ulunna Salu; Dakka

Language codes
- ISO 639-3: dkk
- Glottolog: dakk1238
- ELP: Dakka

Dakka is an endangered Austronesian language of Sulawesi, Indonesia. It is spoken in the Wonomulyo district of Polewali Mandar Regency, and belongs to the Northern branch of the South Sulawesi subgroup.
