= Enrekang language =

Austronesian language spoken in Sulawesi, Indonesia

Enrekang
- Endekan
- Native to: Indonesia
- Region: Sulawesi
- Native speakers: 90,000 (2010)
- Language family: Austronesian: Malayo-Polynesian; South Sulawesi; Northern; Massenrempulu; Enrekang
- Dialects: Eastern; Western (Pattinjo)

Language codes
- ISO 639-3: ptt
- Glottolog: enre1239

Enrekang is an Austronesian language spoken on Sulawesi, Indonesia. It belongs to the Northern branch of the South Sulawesi subgroup, and is closely related to Duri and Maiwa.
