= Mandar language =

Austronesian language spoken in Sulawesi, Indonesia

Mandar
- Mandar ᨆᨊᨛᨉᨑᨛ
- Native to: Indonesia
- Region: West Sulawesi; South Sulawesi
- Ethnicity: Mandar people
- Native speakers: 500,000 (2010 census)
- Language family: Austronesian: Malayo-Polynesian; South Sulawesi; Northern South Sulawesi; Mandar
- Dialects: Balanipa; Majene; Malunda; Pamboang; Sendana
- Writing system: Latin; Lontara

Language codes
- ISO 639-2: mdr
- ISO 639-3: mdr
- Glottolog: mand1442
- Map showing the distribution of the South Sulawesi languages in Sulawesi and Kalimantan, Mandar language in number 16.

Mandar is an Austronesian language spoken by the Mandar people living in provinces of West Sulawesi and South Sulawesi, Indonesia—particularly in the coastal regencies of Majene and Polewali Mandar. It is written in the Lontara script but now is also written in Latin script.

The ethnic Mandar are closely related to three other groups living in South Sulawesi: Bugis, Makassar, and Toraja.

== Phonology ==
Vowels
	Front	Central	Back
Close	i		u
Mid	e		o
Open		a	

Consonants
		Labial	Alveolar	Palatal	Velar	Glottal
Nasal		m	n	ɲ	ŋ	
Plosive/ Affricate	voiceless	p	t	tʃ	k	ʔ
Plosive/ Affricate	voiced	b	d	dʒ	ɡ	
Fricative			s			h
Rhotic			r			
Lateral			l			
Approximant		w		j		

- Sounds /b, d, ɡ, dʒ/ may also be heard as lenited sounds as [v, ɾ, ɣ, ʒ] in intervocalic positions.
