= Mamuju language =

Austronesian language spoken in Sulawesi, Indonesia

Mamuju
- Basa Tomamunyu
- Native to: Indonesia
- Region: Sulawesi
- Native speakers: 63,000 (2010 census)
- Language family: Austronesian: Malayo-Polynesian; South Sulawesi; Northern; Mamuju
- Dialects: Mamuju (prestigious); Sumare-Rangas; Padang; Sinyonyoi

Language codes
- ISO 639-3: mqx
- Glottolog: mamu1255
- Coordinates: 4°S 120°E

Mamuju is an Austronesian language spoken on the island of Sulawesi in Indonesia.

The dialects of Mamuju include Mamuju, Sumare-Rangas, Padang, and Sinyonyoi. The Mamuju dialect is considered more prestigious. Its written form is based on Latin alphabet.

Although Mamuju is traditionally classified as South Sulawesi, it has various words of Wotu–Wolio origin.
