= Duri language =

Language spoken in Indonesia

Duri
- Basa Duri
- Native to: Indonesia
- Region: South Sulawesi
- Ethnicity: Duri people
- Native speakers: (130,000 cited 2000 census)
- Language family: Austronesian: Malayo-Polynesian; South Sulawesi; Northern; Toraja–Duri; Duri

Language codes
- ISO 639-3: mvp
- Glottolog: duri1242

Duri is an Austronesian language of South Sulawesi, Indonesia. It is the prestige variety of the Toraja–Duri languages.

In 2010, 123,000 people spoke this language. It is listed as a 'threatened' language by Ethnologue.
