= Panineman =

Type of fishing boat

Panineman is a traditional open-deck fishing boat of the Ivatan people from the island of Itbayat in the Philippines. It is slightly larger than the largest types of tataya, and can accommodate three pairs of rowers and a single sail.

== See also ==
- Avang
- Chinarem
- Tataya
- Balangay
- Bangka
