= Chinedkeran =

Traditional boat of the Ivatan people

Chinedkeran is a traditional open-deck boat of the Ivatan people from the island of Itbayat in the Philippines. It is similar in size to the falua, with five to thirteen pairs of rowers and a single sail. It is characteristically wide with high strakes due to the rough seas surrounding Itbayat.

== See also ==
- Avang
- Chinarem
- Tataya
- Balangay
- Bangka
- Ipanitika, fishing boats of the Tao people of Orchid Island; also called chinedkelan or chinurikuran
