= Tatara =

Tatara may refer to:

== General uses ==
- Bond (Chinese constellation), one of White Tiger's Stars
- Tatara Bridge, a bridge on the Shimanami Kaidō connecting Hiroshima Prefecture and Ehime Prefecture in Japan
- Tatara (furnace), from the Japanese word for bellows
- Tatara (ship), a small traditional canoe of the Yami people

== People ==
- Tatara clan (ᡨᠠᡨᠠᡵᠠ), a Manchu clan
- Tatara clan (Japan) (多々良氏), a Japanese clan
- Kacper Tatara, a Polish soccer player

== Fictional characters ==
- Kogasa Tatara, a character in Undefined Fantastic Object from the Touhou Project video game franchise
- Tatara (Fushigi Yūgi), a fictional character of the manga Fushigi Yūgi authored by Watase Yuu
- Tatara, the disguised name of the fictional female protagonist Sarasa, or the name of her brother, in the manga Basara authored by Tamura Yumi
