= Ipanitika =

Tao traditional fishing boats

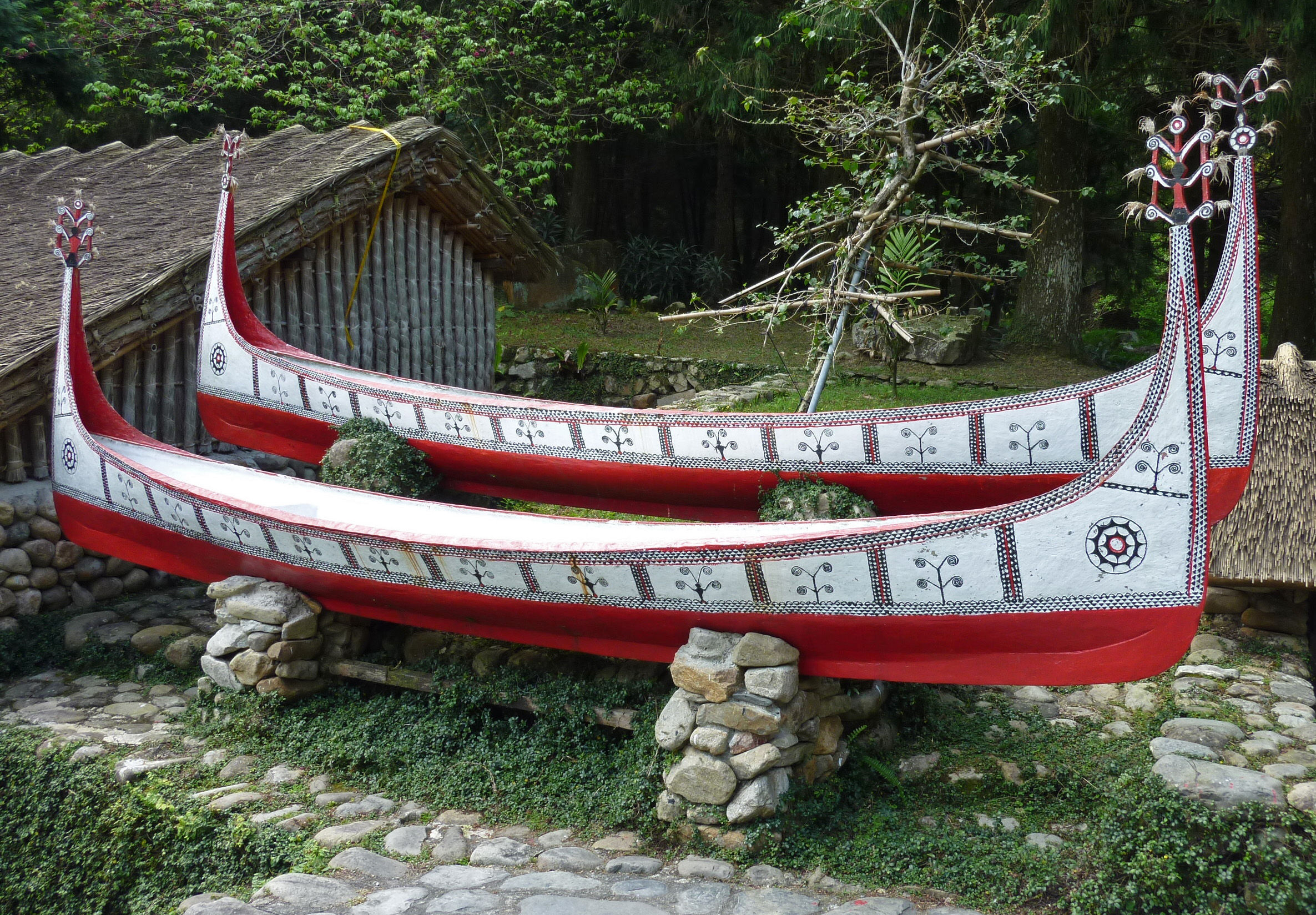
A pair of ipanitika at the Formosan Aboriginal Culture Village with attached moron-no-tatara

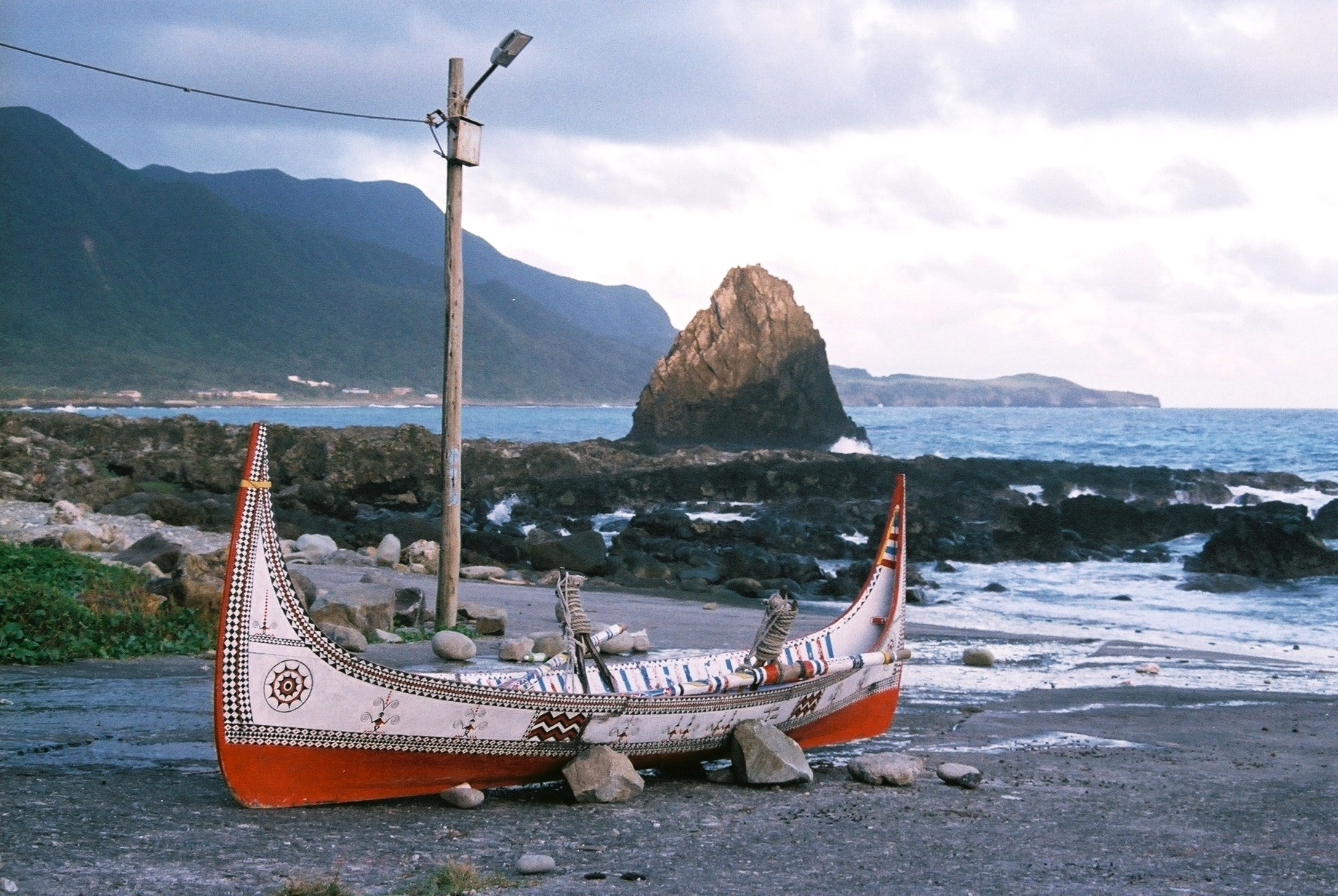
A two-person tatara on a beach

Ipanitika, also known as chinedkulan (also spelled chinedkelan or chinurikuran), are traditional fishing boats of the Tao people of Orchid Island, Taiwan. They are around 7.6 m (25 ft) and can carry up to 10 to 14 people. Smaller versions of the ipanitika is known as the tatara or tatala, which are around 2.3 m (7.5 ft) long and can carry at least two people. They were propelled by oars mounted on a row of rope-wrapped posts that are slotted into a shelf built into the hull of the boat.

== Description ==
ipanitika were traditionally used for voyages to the Batanes Islands in the Philippines to trade with the closely related Ivatan people. The smaller tatara were used for catching seasonal schools of flying fish that arrive from March to June. The launching of ipanitika and tatara during flying fish season is still celebrated annually by the Tao people.

Ipanitika and tatara were built using the lashed-lug techniques unique to Austronesian peoples, with ipanitika usually having four strakes, and tatara having three. Boat construction involved numerous rituals, celebrations, special clothing, and feasting. Wood used to build them must also be taken directly from living trees, as it was taboo to use dead wood on any part of the boat. ipanitika and tatara have sharply upturned extensions at the prows and sterns, giving the ship a crescent-shaped profile similar to the karakoa and kora kora of the Philippines and the Maluku Islands, and the tomako of the Solomon Islands. Like the latter ships, they were kept in special boathouses when not in use.

They are traditionally painted with patterns in white, red, and black, made from lime, red soil, and soot, respectively. They have sun-shaped designs called mata-no-tatara that symbolize eyes at both the front and rear ends of the boat, as well as intricate borders made of repeating patterns of geometric shapes. They also have human-shaped ornaments known as the moron-no-tatara decorated with black chicken feathers at the bow and stern posts. The same shape is also painted on the sides of the boat. These represent Magomaog, a legendary character in Tao folklore that taught them the art of boat-building. Moron-no-tatara are only affixed during certain rituals.

== Gallery ==
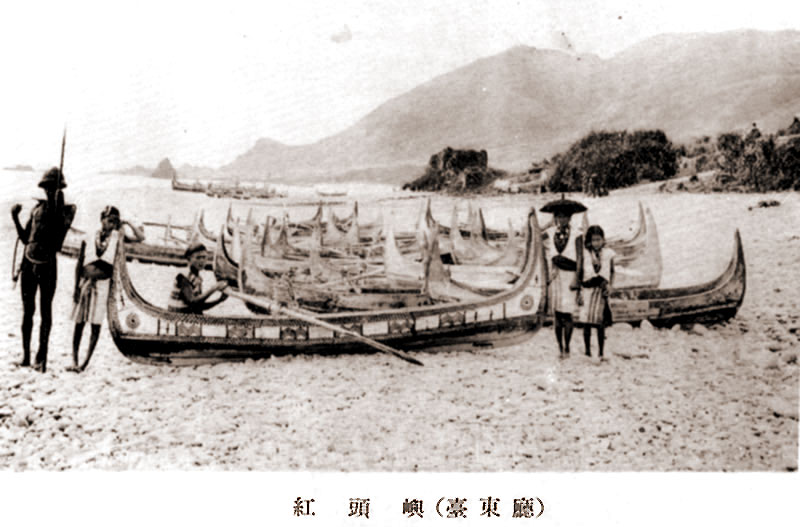
Tao people with tatara on a beach (c. 1931)

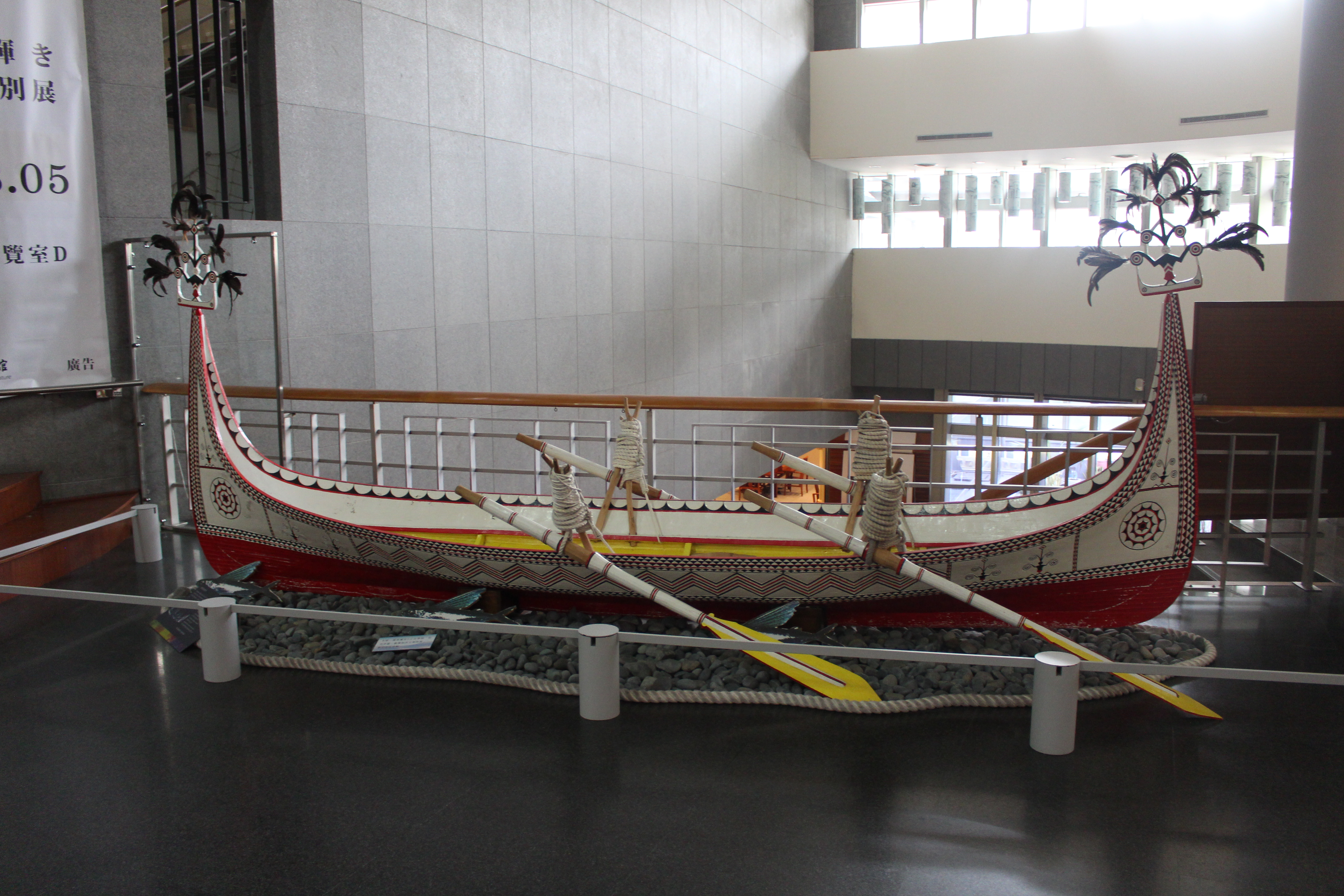
Four-person tatara at a museum in Taiwan with the moron-no-tatara and oars attached

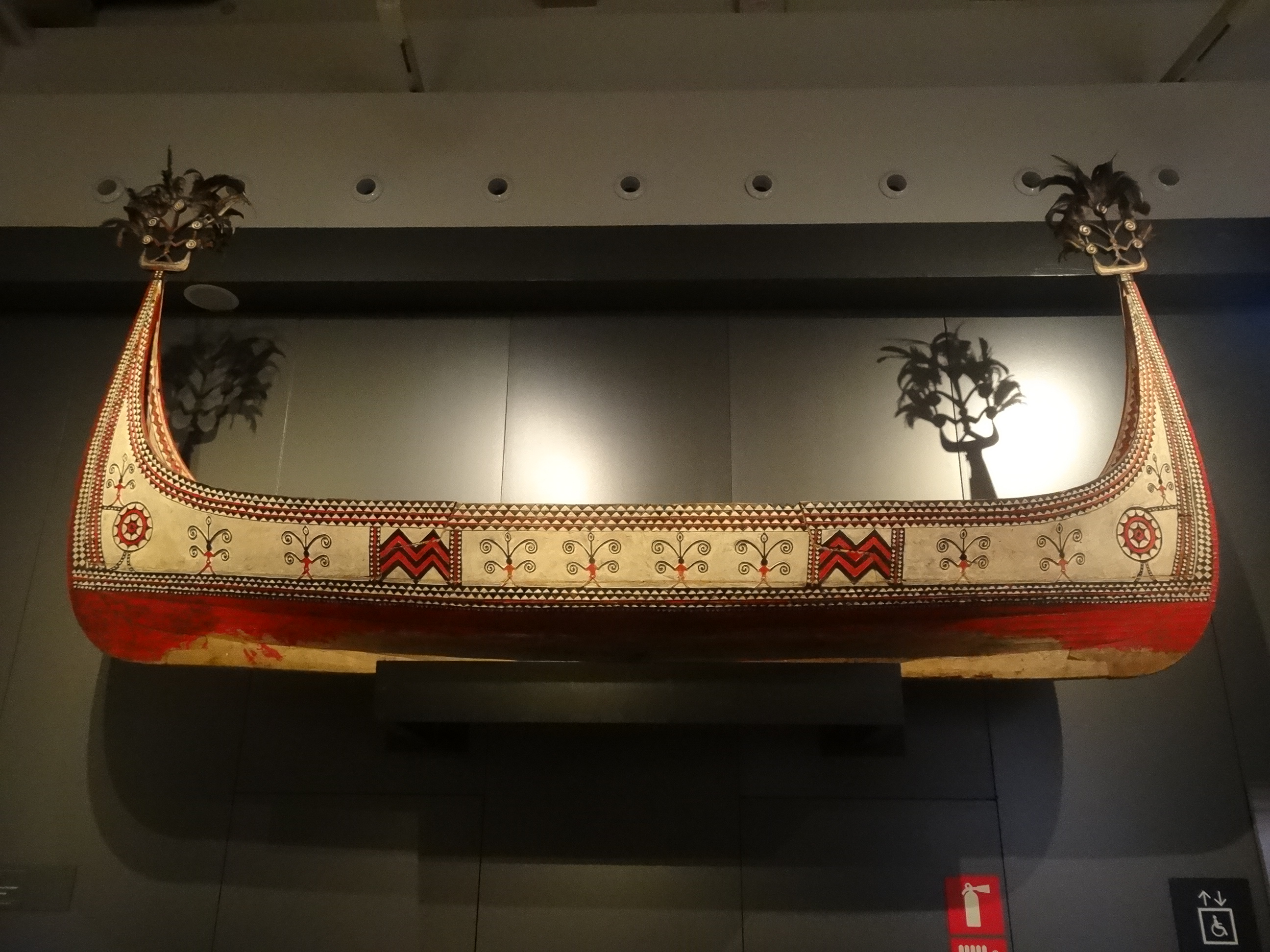
Ipanitika at a museum in Barcelona with attached moron-no-tatara

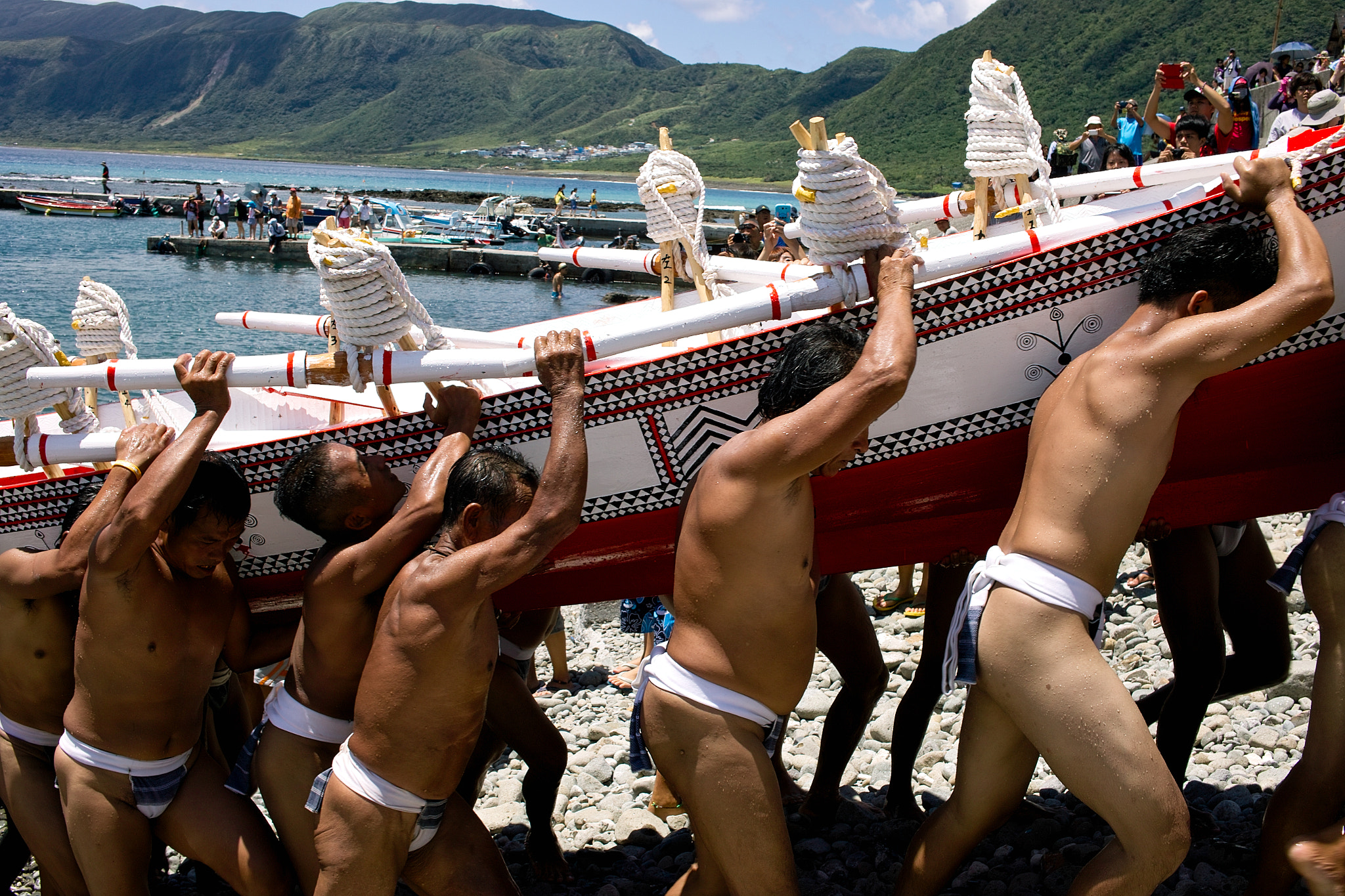
Ipanitika being carried during the annual flying fish festival

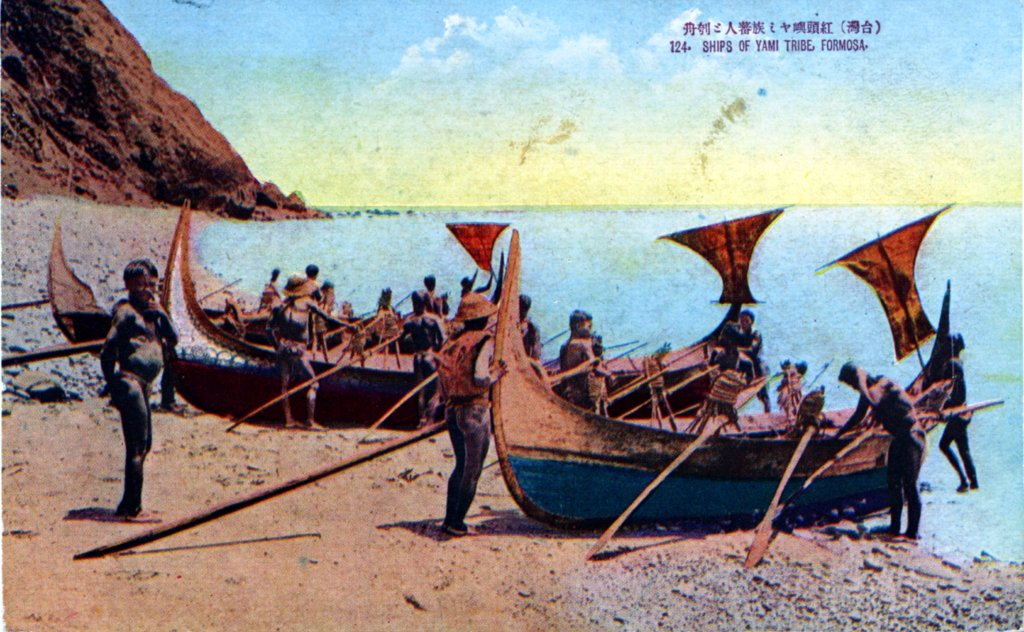
Fishermen on tatara (c. 1911)

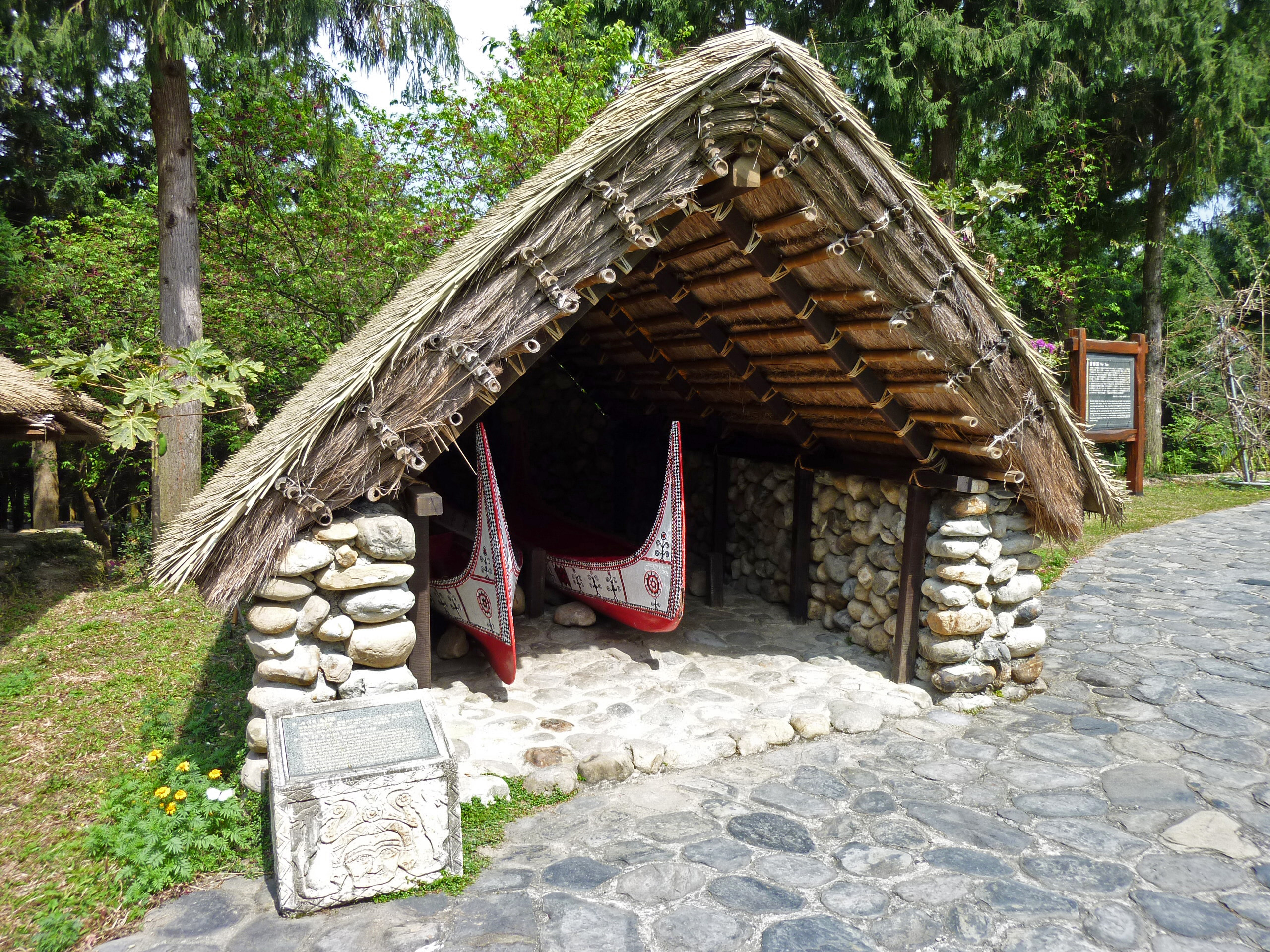
Ipanitika stored in a traditional boathouse

== See also ==
- First Return Voyage in 300 Years
- Tataya
- Chinarem
- Chinedkeran
- Falua
- Outrigger boat
- Lashed-lug boat
- Austronesian peoples
