= MQN =

MQN or mqn may refer to:

- MQN, the IATA code for Mo i Rana Airport, Rana, Norway
- mqn, the ISO 639-3 code for Moronene language, Sulawesi, Indonesia
