= Mori Bawah language =

Austronesian language spoken in Sulawesi, Indonesia

Mori Bawah
- Native to: Indonesia
- Region: Sulawesi
- Native speakers: (28,000 with Mori Atas cited 1988)
- Language family: Austronesian: Malayo-Polynesian; Celebic; Bungku–Tolaki; Mori Bawah

Language codes
- ISO 639-3: xmz
- Glottolog: mori1268

Mori Bawah, also known as Lower Mori or East Mori, is an Austronesian language of the Celebic branch. It is one of the principal languages of the Morowali Regency in Central Sulawesi.

== Classification ==
Mori Bawah is classified as a member of the Bungku-Tolaki group of languages, and shares its closest affinities with Bungku and other languages of the eastern seaboard of Sulawesi, such as Wawonii and Kulisusu. Together, Mori Bawah and the Mori Atas language are sometimes referred to collectively by the cover term Mori.

== Dialects ==
Mori Bawah comprises several dialects. Following Esser, five dialects can be regarded as principal.

- Tinompo
- Tiu
- Moiki
- Watu
- Karunsi’e

The Tinompo dialect is highest in prestige. Tinompo was the dialect spoken by the indigenous royal class, and in the first half of the twentieth century it was further promoted by colonial authorities as a standard throughout the Mori area, including for Mori Atas and Padoe.

== Phonology ==
Mori Bawah has the following sound inventory:

Consonants
| | | | Labial | Alveolar | Velar | Glottal |
|---|---|---|---|---|---|---|
| Nasal | | | m | n | ŋ | |
| Plosive | plain | voiceless | p | t | k | ʔ |
| Plosive | plain | voiced | b | d | g | |
| Plosive | prenasalized | voiceless | ᵐp | ⁿt | ᵑk | |
| Plosive | prenasalized | voiced | ᵐb | ⁿd | ᵑg | |
| Fricative | plain | | β | s | | h |
| Fricative | prenasalized | | | ⁿs | | |
| Trill | | | | r | | |
| Lateral | | | | l | | |

Vowels
| | Front | Back |
|---|---|---|
| Close | i | u |
| Close-Mid | e | o |
| Open | a | |

Only open syllables of the shape V, CV are allowed. Consequently, Mori Bawah is a strictly vowel final-language.

== Grammar ==
=== Pronouns ===
Mori Bawah has seven sets of bound and free pronouns:

| | nominative | | absolutive | | possessive | independent | additive |
| | non-future | future | direct | applicative | possessive | independent | additive |
|---|---|---|---|---|---|---|---|
| 1.sg. | ku | aku | aku | akune | ku | ongkue | ngkuda('a) |
| 2.sg. | u | (i)ko | ko | akomu | mu | omue | muda('a) |
| 3.sg. | i | ta | o | akono | no | onoe | nada('a) |
| 1.pl.in. | to | kita | kita | akita | to | otae | ntada('a) |
| 1.pl.ex. | ki | kami | kami | akami | mami | omami | mamida('a) |
| 2.pl. | i | (i)komiu | komiu | akomiu | miu | omiu | mida('a) |
| 3.pl. | do | ira | ira | ako'ira | do | ondae | ndada('a) |

=== Agreement ===
Core arguments (A: subject of transitive verbs; O: object of transitive verbs, S: subject of intransitive verbs) are not marked for case, but are obligatorily indexed by a pronominal agreement marker on the verb.

With transitive verbs, A is always indexed by a nominative pronoun, and O by an absolutive pronoun.

I_{A}-pe'ata-'ira_{O}-mo [i Ana Wulaa]_{A} [mia atuu-do]_{O}
3.SG.NOM-enslave-3.PL.ABS-PRV PN Child Gold person DIST-3.PL.POSS
'Gold child took those people as slaves.'

The indexing of the single argument of intransitive verbs shows split-ergative alignment: S is always indexed by a nominative pronoun in future clauses, and also in imperative, negative and certain other dependent types of non-future clauses. In all other cases, S is indexed by an absolutive pronoun.

=== Voice ===
Mori Bawah has two valency-reducing voice types, passive voice and antipassive voice.

If a transitive verb is marked for passive voice with the infix <in>, it becomes formally intransitive, and O (the "object") becomes the S-argument. The original A-argument cannot be mentioned at all.

Ta p<in>epate
3.SG.FUT PASS:kill
'He will be killed.'

In antipassive voice, the verb takes the prefix poN-. The object can be omitted, or overtly expressed if indefinite; it is however not indexed by a person-indexing pronoun. The original subject of the transitive verb becomes the S-argument in a formally intransitive antipassive clause.

ka-i pom-pepate singa
ka-3.SG.NOM AP-kill lion
'...and he killed a lion.'
