= Bangka (boat) =

Traditional Filipino watercraft with outriggers

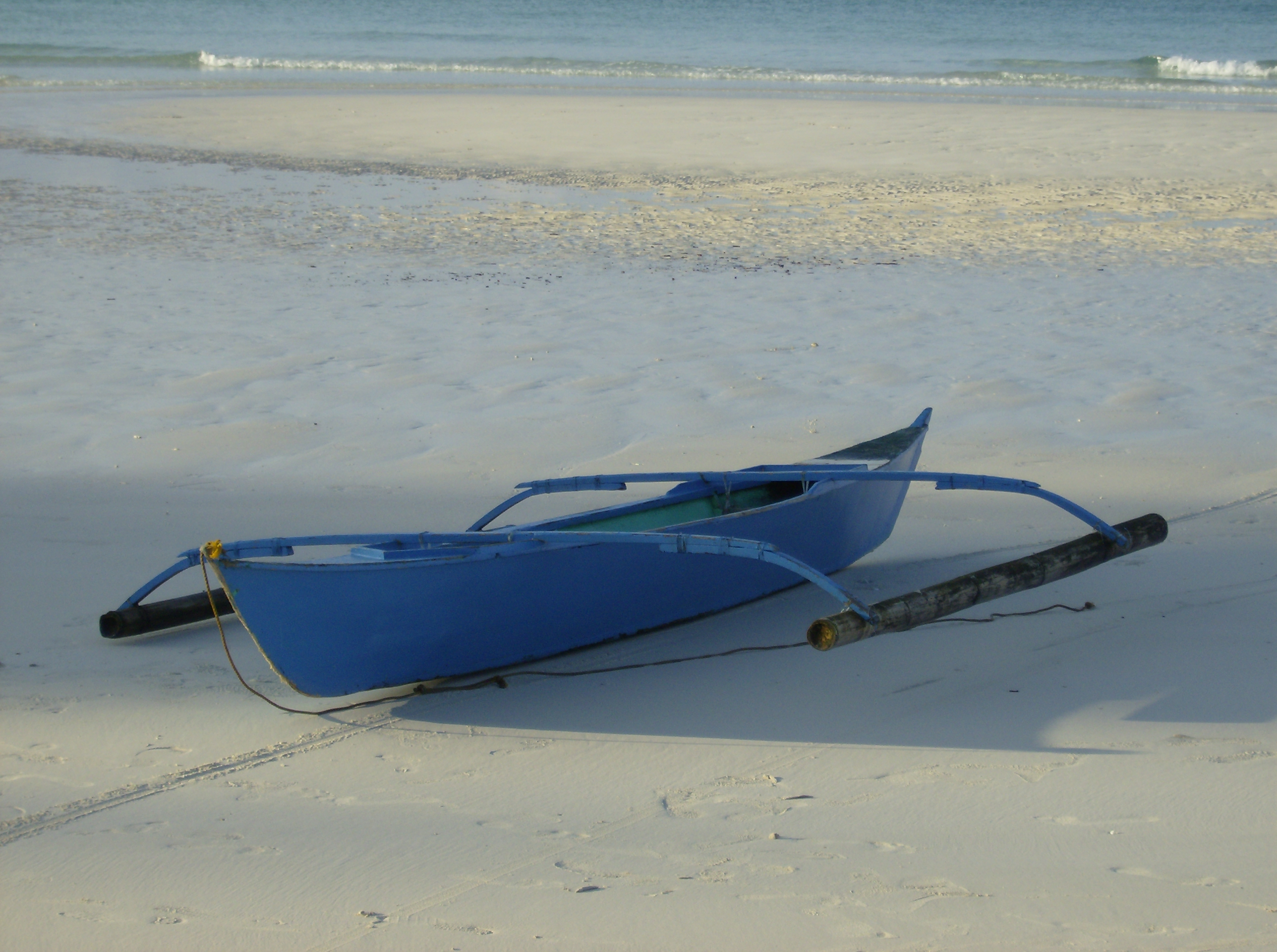
A small bangka used for transporting passengers of larger boats in Boracay

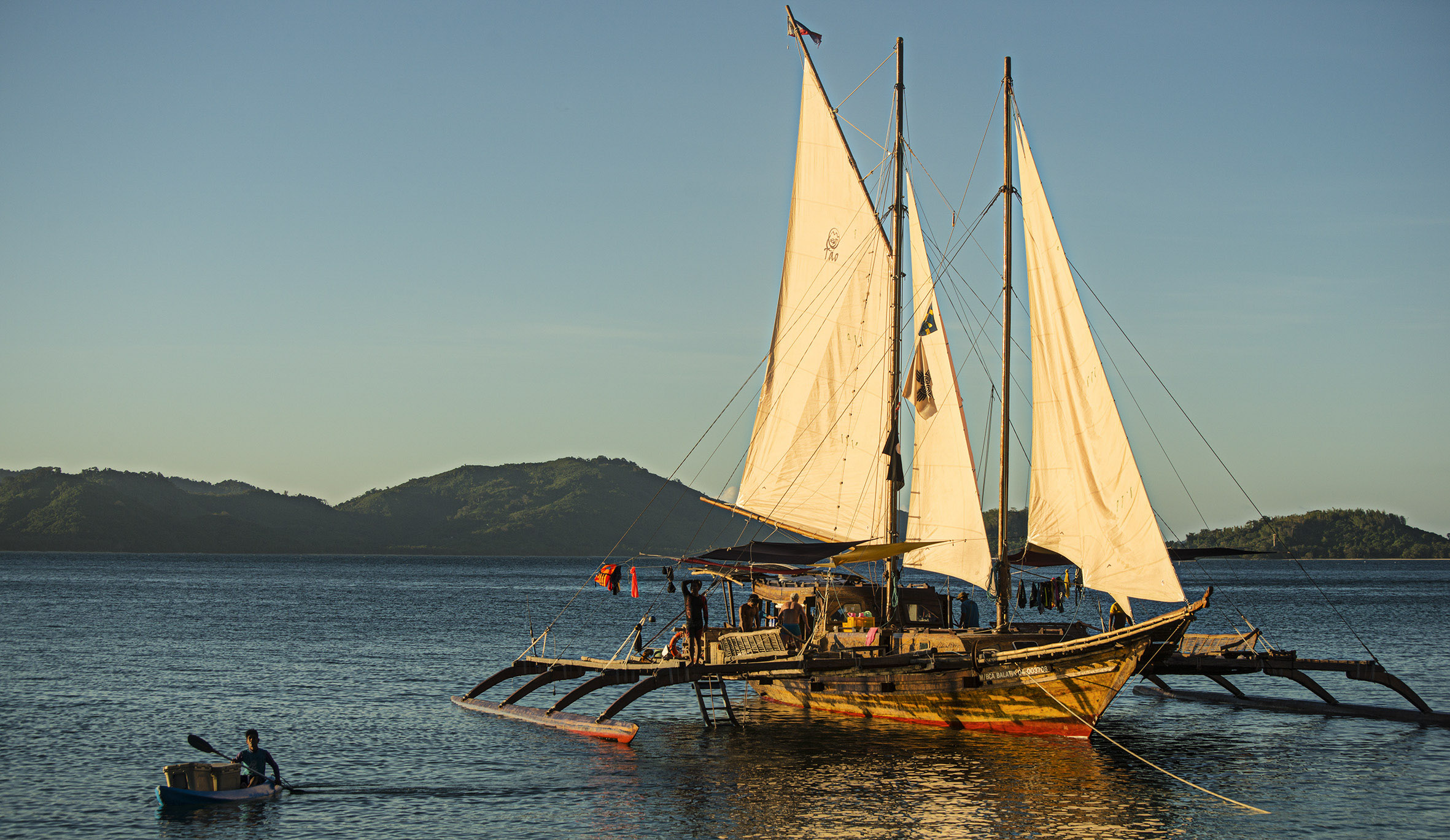
Balatik, a reconstruction of a large sewn-plank paraw in Palawan

Bangka are various native watercraft of the Philippines. It originally referred to small double-outrigger dugout canoes used in rivers and shallow coastal waters, but since the 18th century, it has expanded to include larger lashed-lug ships, with or without outriggers. Though the term used is the same throughout the Philippines, "bangka" can refer to a very diverse range of boats specific to different regions. Bangka was also spelled as banca, panca, or panga (m. banco, panco, pango) in Spanish. It is also known archaically as sakayan (also spelled sacayan).

== Etymology ==
Bangka is derived from Proto-Malayo-Polynesian *baŋkaʔ, with cognates including Kavalan bangka, Mori bangka, and Sumbawa bangka. It is a doublet of two other protoforms referring to boats: Proto-Austronesian *qabaŋ and Proto-Central-Malayo-Polynesian *waŋka. Ultimately from the Proto-Austronesian lexical root *baŋ for 'boat'.

== History ==
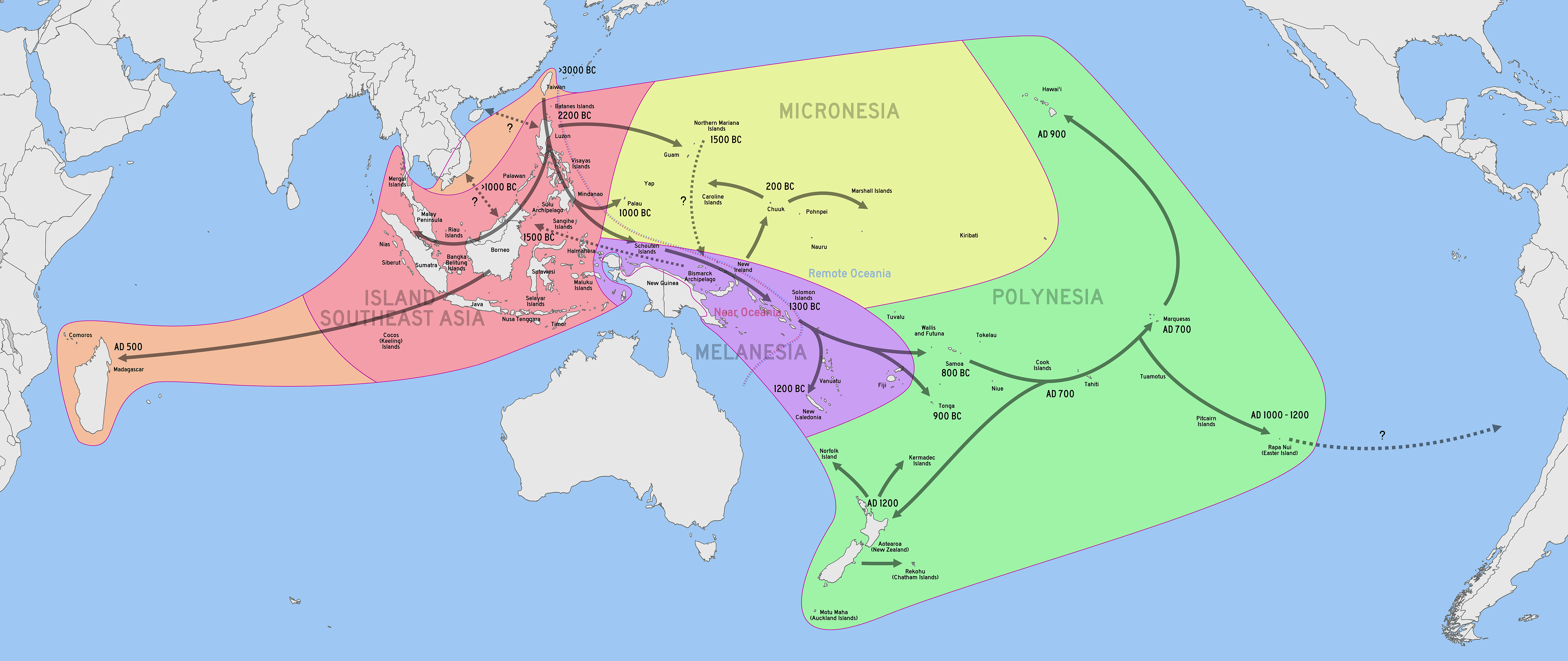
Map showing the migration and expansion of the Austronesians which began at about 3000 BCE

Indigenous Philippine boats originated from the ancestral single-outrigger dugout canoes of the Austronesian peoples, which themselves evolved from catamarans. These boats were the first ocean-voyaging vessels in the world, which allowed the seaborne Austronesian Expansion around 3000 to 1500 BCE, from coastal southeastern China and Taiwan to Island Southeast Asia, Micronesia, Island Melanesia, Polynesia, and Madagascar.

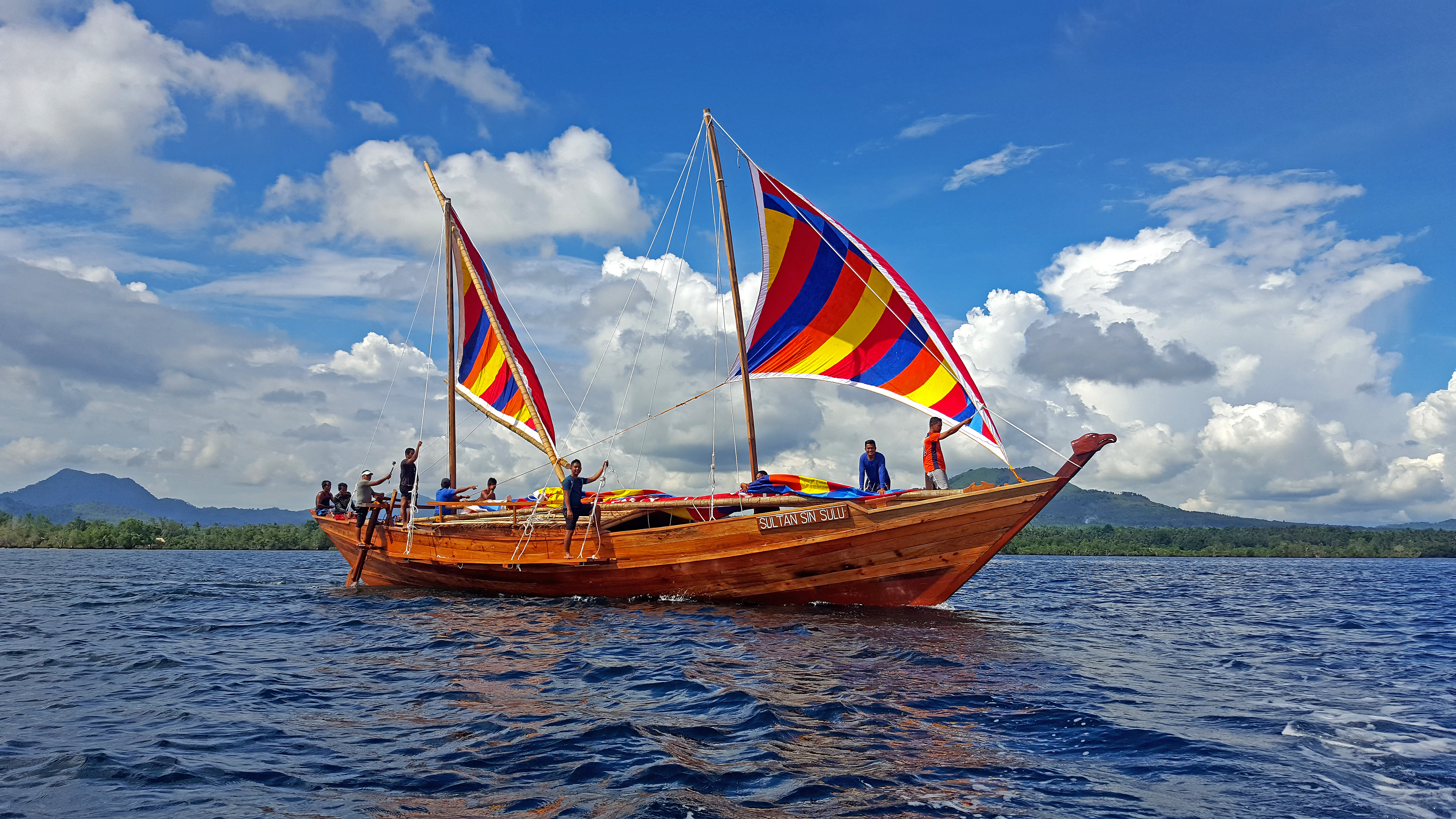
Replica of a balangay, a pre-colonial trading ship excavated from Butuan. These replicas do not include the outriggers.

The oldest recovered boats in the Philippines are the 9 to 11 balangay found in Butuan variously dated between 689 CE to 988 CE, all specimens of whom were typical lashed-lug Austronesian boats. The technique remained common in Philippine (and Southeast Asian) boats right up to the 19th century, when modern boats started to be built with metal nails. Edge-joined planks continue to survive in some areas in the Philippines, though these are usually secured with metal rebars and rods, instead of the traditional lugs and lashings.

Unfortunately most excavations and recoveries of pre-colonial shipwrecks (including those by the National Museum) in Southeast Asia focus more on the cargo rather than studying the ship structures themselves. Looting is also a problem, which contributes to the paucity of research on pre-colonial Filipino watercraft.

Various types of bangka were used in maritime trade. While the polities in the Philippines remained small and largely in the periphery of Southeast Asian trade, they were nevertheless part of the Southeast Asian market. The earliest exchange of material culture was the late Neolithic trade in lingling-o double-headed jade or gold ornaments, manufactured in Luzon, which was traded with other Austronesian polities in southern Vietnam and Taiwan. This was followed by later trade in ceramics from mainland Southeast Asia and southern China in exchange for resins, aromatic woods, gold, pearls, sea cucumber (trepanging), tortoiseshell, civets, fabrics, beeswax, and bird's nest. The main trading contacts of Philippine polities included the Champa polities in Vietnam, China, and the Sultanate of Brunei.

Bangka were also used in wars and the naval warfare and coastal raids (mangayaw) of thalassocracies, a notable example of such a warship is the karakoa of the Visayas. These were seasonal and played a large part in the noble and warrior classes gaining prestige and plunder. Warriors participating in the raids had their exploits recorded in elaborate full-body tattoos.

In the various animist anitism beliefs of precolonial Philippines, the building of bangka often involved religious rituals, from the choosing of the trees for timber to rituals before voyages. Newly built bangka were imbued with a guardian spirit (anito) through various rituals, usually involving blood sacrifices. Ancient and early colonial-era bangka were also usually decorated with a carved or painted face. Bangka had a central role in pre-Hispanic Filipino culture, functioning as personal transports, fishing ships, trading ships, and raiding warships. Motorized or paddle-driven bangka still remain the main form of watercraft in the Philippines.

== Construction ==
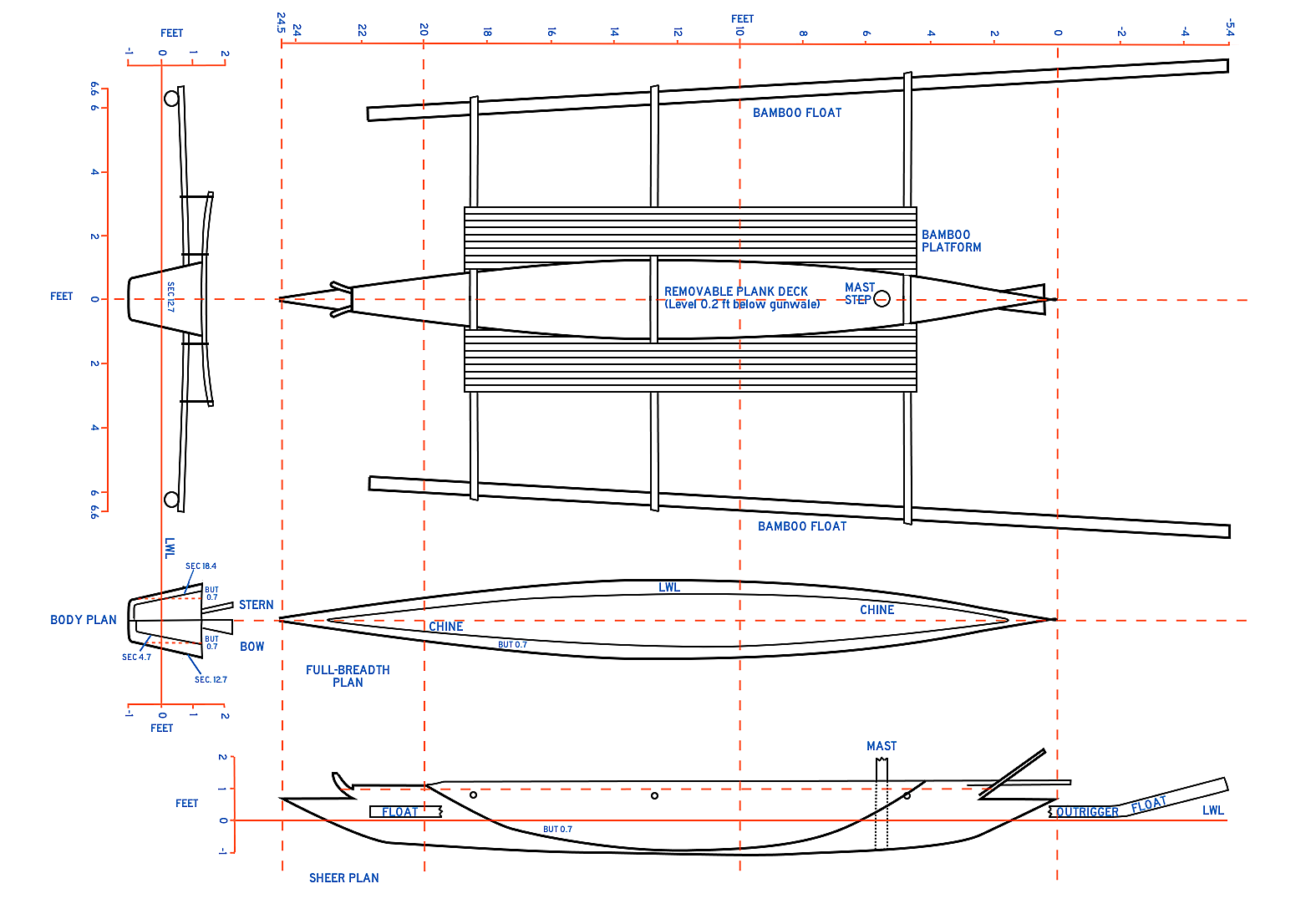
Plan, midships section, and lines of a vinta

A paraw in Boracay

Like all ancestral Austronesian boats, the hull of the bangka at its simplest form had five parts. The bottom part consists of single piece of hollowed-out log (essentially a dugout canoe, the original meaning of the word bangka). At the sides were two planks, and two horseshoe-shaped wood pieces formed the prow and stern. These were fitted tightly together edge-to-edge with lugs, dowels and lashings (made from rattan or fiber), without using any nails. They formed the shell of the boat, which was then reinforced by horizontal ribs. They had no central rudders but were instead steered using an oar on one side. These were built in the double-canoe configuration or had a single outrigger on the windward side. In Island Southeast Asia, these developed into double outriggers on each side that provided greater stability when tacking against the wind. Bangka were also typically traditionally caulked using a boiled mixture of balaw sap from apitong trees (Dipterocarpus spp.) and gata (coconut milk).

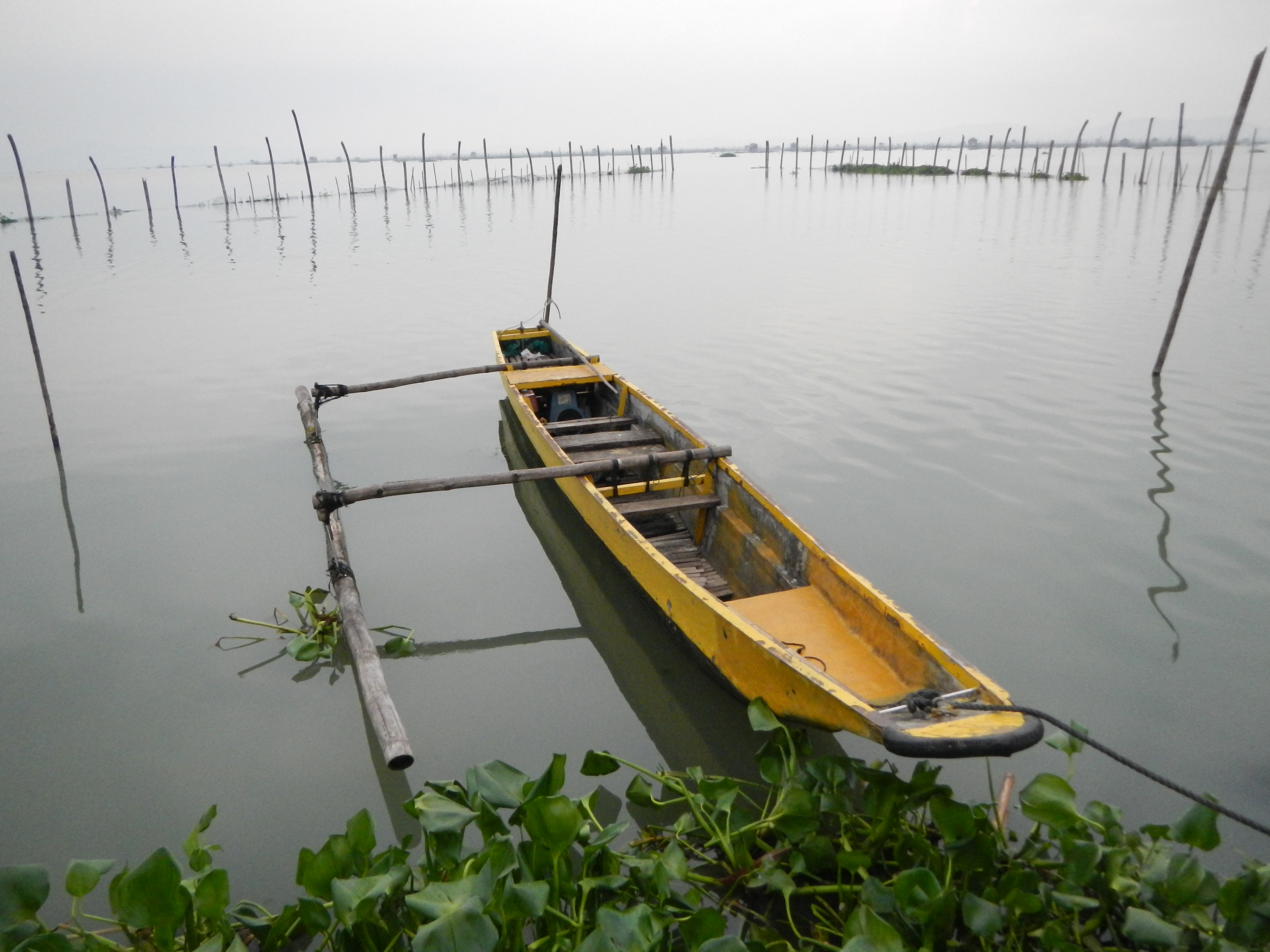
A single-outrigger motorized armadahan from Laguna de Bay

Though most modern bangka in the Philippines have double-outriggers, single-outrigger dugout canoes also exist in the Philippines. Examples include canoes from Laguna de Bay, as well as boats from Lake Bulusan and Lake Buhi of the Bicol Region. A notable example is the armadahan of Laguna de Bay, which were dugouts typically 10 to 12 m (33 to 39 ft) long and 1 to 1.3 m (3.3 to 4.3 ft). They were equipped with two masts. The single outrigger float (palangoy) was either two bamboo poles lashed together or a flattened elongated beam on the starboard side. It also featured a counter-balance beam projecting off the port side known as the paltek. In modern times, these types of boats are usually motorized or paddled. And the single outrigger is used to provide lateral stability, while still allowing fishermen to work with fishing nets. They were more widespread in the Philippines in the past, with a specimen in the University of Southampton from Manila Bay collected in the 1940s for example. But they have largely disappeared in modern times, partly due to the scarcity of suitable timber and partly due to the relative cheapness of fiberglass boats.

== Cultural significance ==
Aside from being used in trade and war, bangka were of central significance to various cultures throughout the Philippines. Villages were known as barangay, derived from balangay, a common large boat type. Boat terminologies were used for ranks, place names, and even personal names, even in island interiors. Among the Sama-Bajau people of the southern Philippines, various types of bangka like the djenging and the lepa served as houseboats of nuclear families and often sail together in clan flotillas. Small bangka were also sometimes used to transport rice and farm goods on land, as they were more convenient on narrow pathways than sleds or wagons.

Bangka feature prominently in Visayan mythology. A boat known as the balanday is used by the deity Magyan to ferry souls of the dead. In the epic Labaw Donggon of the Suludnon people, a boat known as biday na inagta (lit. "black boat") is featured prominently. In the Western Visayas, a divination ritual known as the kibang involves occupants sitting perfectly still in a bangka and asking questions while a diwata (nature spirit) answers by rocking the boat.

== Modern bangka ==
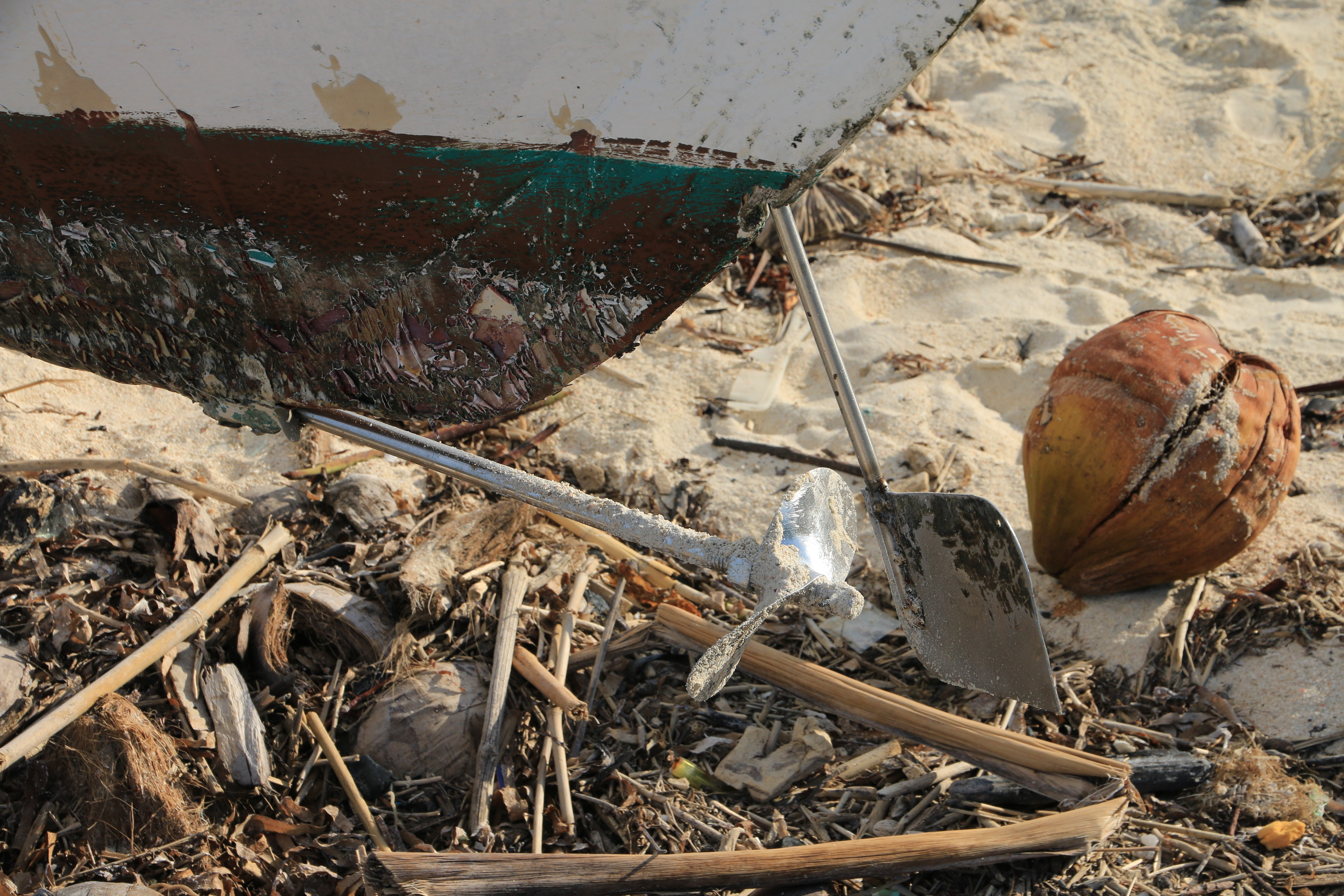
Propeller and rudder of a motorized bangka (pump boat)

Since the introduction of the motor engine in the 1970s, the formerly widespread Philippine sailing traditions have mostly been lost. Most modern bangka are motorized and are known as "pump boats" (or pambot) or lancha (lantsa). Smaller boats usually use gasoline or diesel engines, while larger boats can use recycled automobile engines.

Bangka are also increasingly being made with fiber-reinforced plastic (fiberglass) instead of wood, which are more resistant to shipworms and rotting and are relatively cheaper.

== Types ==
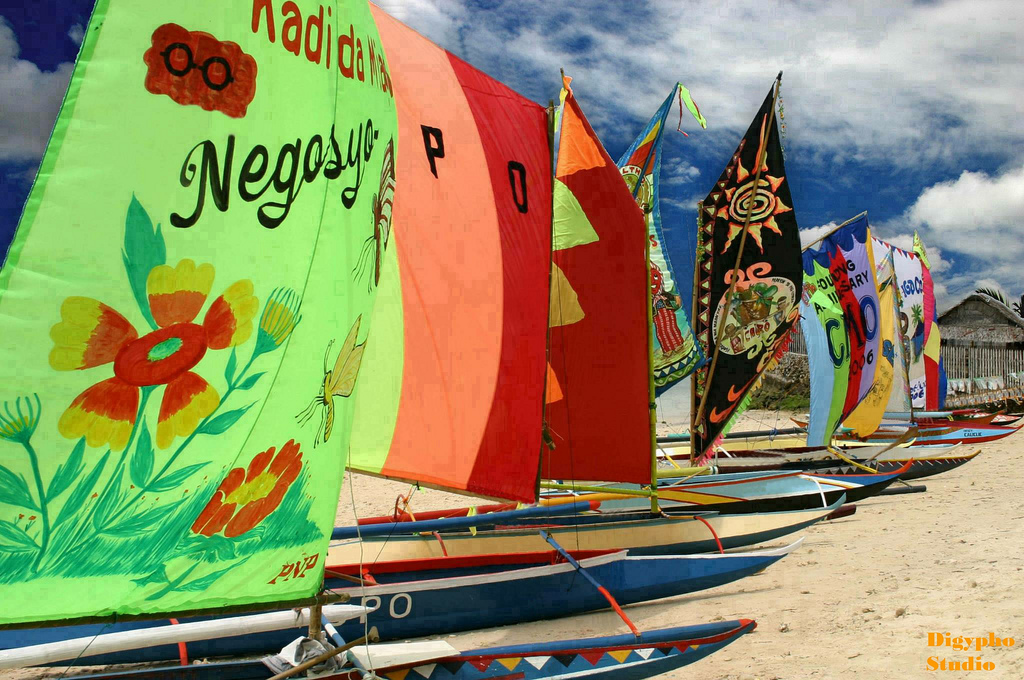
Bigiw with tanja, crab claw, and spritsails from the Island Garden City of Samal, Davao del Norte

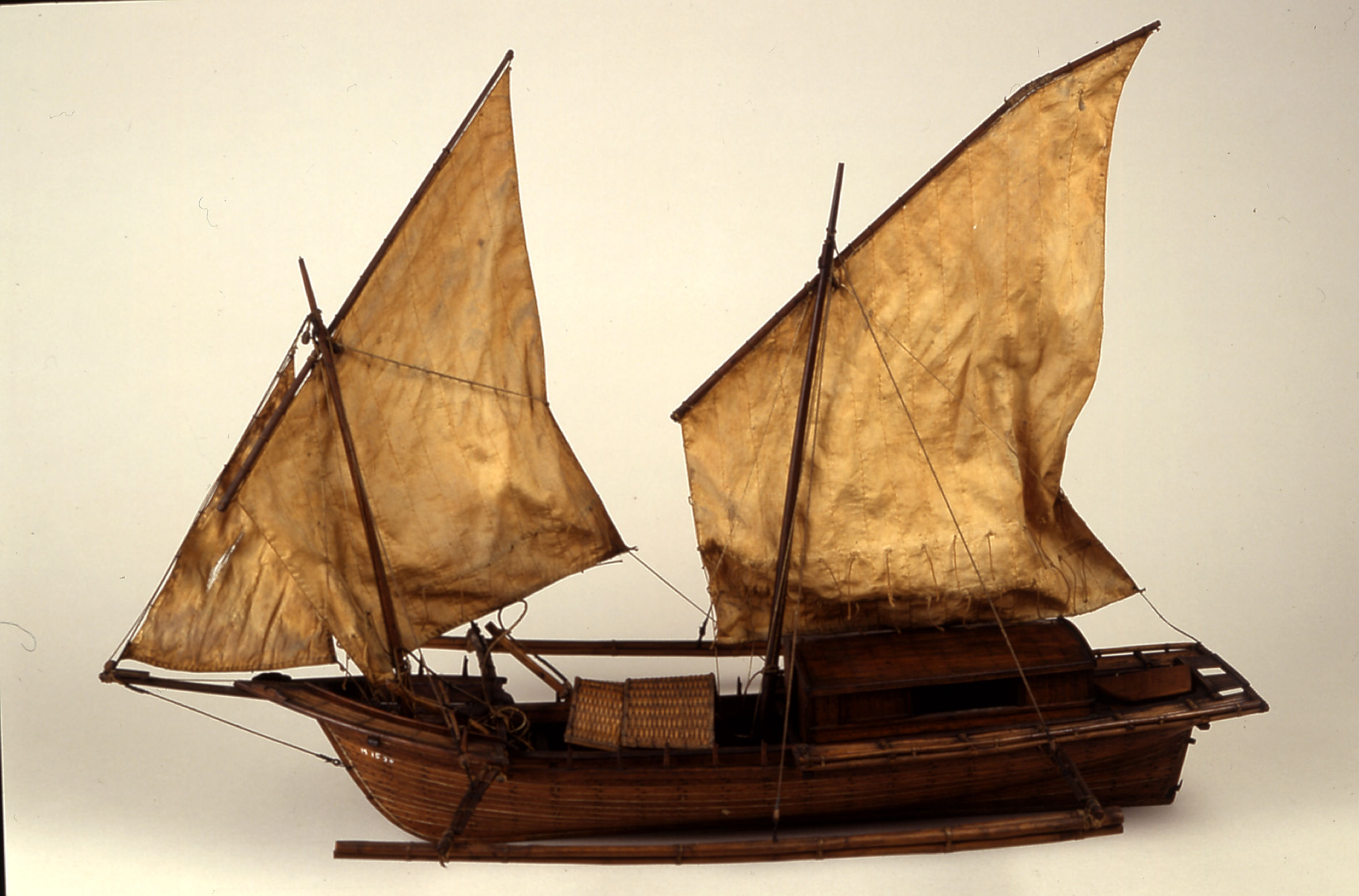
Model of a guilalo displayed in the 1887 Exposición General de las Islas Filipinas in Madrid

=== Outrigger boats ===
The large bangka in Taal lake characteristically have high prows and sterns

- Armadahan - outrigger fishing boats from Laguna de Bay.
- Balacion - a large outrigger sailboat of the Tagalog people in Laguna with three tanja sails.
- Balangay - also known as barangay, were very large two-masted sailing ships made using the lashed-lug boatbuilding technique. They were used for ferrying cargo and sometimes as warships. Large balangay usually had outriggers.
- Baroto or Baloto - A general term for native boats with or without outriggers in the Western Visayas, synonymous to the term paraw. Not to be confused with the Sama-Bajau balutu.
- Batil - a large colonial-era sailboat used for ferrying passengers and goods between Visayas and Luzon.
- Bigiw - small double-outrigger bangka from Mindanao, Visayas, and Palawan characterized by a knife-like prow. Its name means "needlefish." They are traditionally propelled by sails and steered with a single oar, but are usually motorized in modern times.
- Dinahit - a traditional non-motorized double-outrigger sailing boat from the Catanduanes Islands with crab claw sails. It is celebrated in the annual Dinahit Festival of Pandan, Catanduanes.
- Djenging - also known as balutu, large outrigger houseboats of the Sama-Bajau people.
- Guilalo - a large outrigger cargo ship of the Tagalog people in Cavite. Characterized by two large settee sails.
- Karakoa - very large outrigger warships around 25 m (82 ft) in length. They were equipped with fighting platforms (burulan) and platforms for paddlers (daramba). They had a characteristic crescent-shape with the prow usually carved into a representation of the mythical sea serpent bakunawa.
- Pangayaw or mangayaw - a general term for raiding warships.
- Lanong - very large two-masted outrigger warships of the Iranun people that could reach 30 m (98 ft) in length.
- Paraw - a general term for fast double-outrigger sailboats from Visayas. They characteristically have large crab-claw sails opposite a smaller triangular foresail. Large cargo paraw had decorated edges.
- Pasaplap - outrigger sailboat from Ilocos.
- Seberen - outrigger sailboat from Bicol.
- Vinta - also known as pilang or dapang, are small double-outrigger boats from the Sama-Bajau and Moro peoples from the Sulu Archipelago, the Zamboanga Peninsula, and southern Mindanao. They are typically rigged with colorful square tanja sails and have bifurcated prows and sterns. In 1985, the vinta Sarimanok was sailed from Bali to Madagascar to replicate ancient seafaring techniques.

=== Single-hulled boats ===
- Avang - a large two-masted closed-deck cargo ship of the Ivatan people about 14 to 18 m (46 to 59 ft) in length. Extinct since 1910.
- Bilo - a cargo vessel with a small rectangular tanja sail.
- Falua - a traditional open-deck boat of the Ivatan people usually 8 to 12 m (26 to 39 ft) in length.
- Garay - single-masted warships of the Banguingui people.
- Lepa - houseboats of the Sama-Bajau with no outriggers.
- Salisipan - long and narrow war canoes of the Iranun and Banguingui peoples propelled by rowing.
- Tataya - a general term for small boats, with or without outriggers, powered by sails or rowers in the Batanes Islands. They have several subtypes based on size and island origin. They can also be used to refer to the larger traditional trading ships of the islands: the avang, falua, chinedkeran, and chinarem.

=== Dugout canoes ===
- Awang - elaborately carved dugout canoes used in Lake Lanao by the Maranao people.
- Bangka anak-anak - very small dugout canoes typically built for Sama-Bajau children.
- Birau - small dugout canoes of the Sama-Bajau people.
- Buggoh - small dugout canoes of the Sama-Bajau people.
- Owong - small dugout canoes used in Lake Sebu by the T'boli people.
- Junkun - small dugout canoes of the Sama-Bajau people.

=== Modern ===
- Basnigan - very large modern motorized double-outrigger fishing ships around 70 to 100 ft (21 to 30 m) in length. They are capable of sailing in 12 to 15 ft (3.7 to 4.6 m) waves. They have detachable masts and booms used in a type of lift net fishing known as basnig or balasnig. They usually operate with smaller daughter ships known as lawagan, these are paddle-driven double-outrigger bangka carried on board. They are a common type of bangka in the Visayas Islands.
- Pump boat - corrupted into pambot or pombot, a general term for motorized small bangka.

== See also ==
- Karakoa
- Lanong
- Trimaran
