= Padoe language =

Austronesian language spoken in Sulawesi, Indonesia

Padoe
- Native to: Indonesia
- Region: Sulawesi
- Native speakers: (5,000 cited 1991)
- Language family: Austronesian: Malayo-Polynesian; Celebic; Bungku–Tolaki; Western; Interior; Padoe

Language codes
- ISO 639-3: pdo
- Glottolog: pado1242
- ELP: Padoe

Padoe is an Austronesian language of the Celebic branch. It was traditionally spoken in the rolling plains south of Lake Matano in South Sulawesi province. In the 1950s, a portion of the Padoe-speaking population fled to Central Sulawesi to escape the ravages of the Darul Islam/Tentara Islam Indonesia (DI/TII) revolt. In 1991, it was estimated there were 5,000 speakers of Padoe in all locations.

== Classification ==
Padoe is classified as a member of the Bungku-Tolaki group of languages, and shares its closest affinities with the Mori Atas language. The Padoe language has sometimes been included with Mori Atas and Mori Bawah under the broader cover term Mori.
