= Bungku–Tolaki languages =

Subgroup of the Austronesian language family

Bungku–Tolaki
- Geographic distribution: Indonesia (Sulawesi)
- Linguistic classification: Austronesian: Malayo-Polynesian; Celebic; Bungku–Tolaki
- Proto-language: Proto-Bungku-Tolaki
- Subdivisions: Eastern; Western

Language codes
- Glottolog: bung1268
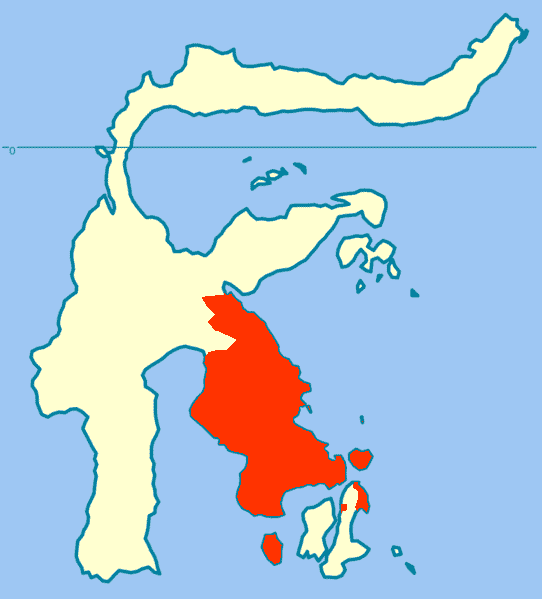

The Bungku–Tolaki languages (also known as Bungku–Mori in older literature) are a group of languages spoken primarily in South East Sulawesi province, Indonesia, and in neighboring parts of Central and South Sulawesi provinces.

== Languages ==
Mead (1998) presents the following tree-model classification for Bungku–Tolaki. This classification is based on the historical-comparative method in linguistics.

- Eastern
  - Moronene
  - East Coast: Bungku, Bahonsuai, Kulisusu (Koroni, Kulisusu, Taloki), Wawonii, Mori Bawah
- Western
  - Interior: Mori Atas (spoken in Mori Atas district of North Morowali Regency), Padoe (spoken in area near Sorowako in Nuha district of East Luwu Regency), Tomadino
  - West Coast: Tolaki, Rahambuu, Kodeoha (spoken in Kodeoha district in North Kolaka Regency), Waru

This classification supersedes Mead (1999), an earlier classification proposed by Mead in 1994. Based on a lexicostatistical comparison, his earlier classification proposed 'Bungku,' 'Mori,' and 'Tolaki' as primary subdivisions under Bungku–Tolaki.

In view of more recent evidence from shared sound change and innovations in pronoun sets, the unity of the proposed Mori group (comprising Bahonsuai, Mori Bawah, Mori Atas, Padoe and Tomadino) could not be maintained.

== Phonology ==
The sound system of all Bungku–Tolaki languages is characterized by a simple five-vowel system and the complete lack of final consonants. However, final consonants must be reconstructed for Proto-Bungku–Tolaki.

== Reconstruction ==
Proto-Bungku-Tolaki
- Reconstruction of: Bungku-Tolaki languages
- Reconstructed ancestors: Proto-Austronesian: Proto-Malayo-Polynesian; Proto-Celebic

Proto-Bungku–Tolaki has been reconstructed by Mead (1998).

== See also ==
- Mori language
