= First Return Voyage in 300 Years =

2026 guided expedition of the Tao people

- Participants of the expedition with the indigenous boat Ovayan
- Sponsor: Indigenous Peoples Cultural Foundation
- Country: Taiwan
- Start: Orchid Island, Lanyu, Taiwan; 14 June 2026
- End: Batan Island, Mahatao, Batanes, Philippines; 15 June 2026
- Ships: 8 ships and a ipanitika (Ovayan))
- Crew: 60 (Ovayan)

The First Return Voyage in 300 Years was an guided expedition from Orchid Island in Taiwan to the Batanes in the Philippines. It involved Ovayan, a ipanitika or indigenous boat of the Tao people. They travelled to Mahatao, Batanes to connect with the Ivatan people via a route which was last traversed by their people 300 years ago.

== Background ==
The Indigenous Peoples Cultural Foundation was the proponent of the First Return Voyage in 300 Years project made in collaboration with the Taiwanese Council of Indigenous Peoples, and Orchid Island's six Tao communities. The project took three years to fulfill. This is a cultural exchange activity between the Tao and the Ivatan people of the northern Philippines.

The goal of the project is to enable the Tao people sail from Orchid Island to Batanes in the Philippines to retrace an ancient maritime route which is said to be last crossed 300 years ago.

The Tao are a small minority in Taiwan with 5,120 members or around 0.02 percent of the island's 23 million population.

=== Ovayan ===
A Ipanitika, an indigenous wooden plank boat, for the purpose of the project by the Tao. The boat named Ovayan (transl. Golden Friendship) was built on March 2026 and had a trial voyage on 28 April. A traditional launching ceremony for Ovayan was held on 9 June 2026. The boat is 12 meters (39 ft) long and has a capacity to carry 20 people.

== Expedition ==
The Ovayan departed from Orchid Island on 15 June 2026. The vessel was paddled in relays by 60 people, with 20 participants rotating in and out from the support ships. It was accompanied by the Porrima P111 and seven support vessels, which provided escort and logistical support throughout the voyage.

The fleet travelled 100 nautical miles (190 km) across the Bashi Channel to reach the seaport in Mahatao, Batanes in the Philippines at around 2:30pm on 16 June.
