= Bahonsuai language =

Austronesian language spoken on Sulawesi, Indonesia

Bahonsuai
- Native to: Indonesia
- Region: Sulawesi
- Native speakers: (200 cited 1999)
- Language family: Austronesian: Malayo-Polynesian; Celebic; Bungku–Tolaki; Bahonsuai

Language codes
- ISO 639-3: bsu
- Glottolog: baho1237
- ELP: Bahonsuai

Bahonsuai is an Austronesian language of Central Sulawesi, Indonesia.
