= Tomadino language =

Austronesian language spoken in Sulawesi, Indonesia

Tomadino
- Native to: Indonesia
- Region: Sulawesi
- Native speakers: (600 cited 1999)
- Language family: Austronesian: Malayo-Polynesian; Celebic; Bungku–Tolaki; Western; Interior; Tomadino

Language codes
- ISO 639-3: tdi
- Glottolog: toma1248
- ELP: Tomadino

Tomadino is an Austronesian language of Central Sulawesi, Indonesia. It belongs to the Bungku–Tolaki branch of the Celebic subgroup.
