= Rahambuu language =

Austronesian language spoken in Sulawesi, Indonesia

Rahambuu
- Native to: Indonesia
- Region: Sulawesi
- Native speakers: (5,000 cited 1999)
- Language family: Austronesian: Malayo-Polynesian; Celebic; Bungku–Tolaki; Western; West Coast; Rahambuu

Language codes
- ISO 639-3: raz
- Glottolog: raha1237
- ELP: Rahambuu

Rahambuu is an Austronesian language of Southeast Sulawesi, Indonesia.
