= Bigiw =

Traditional Philippine sailing vessel

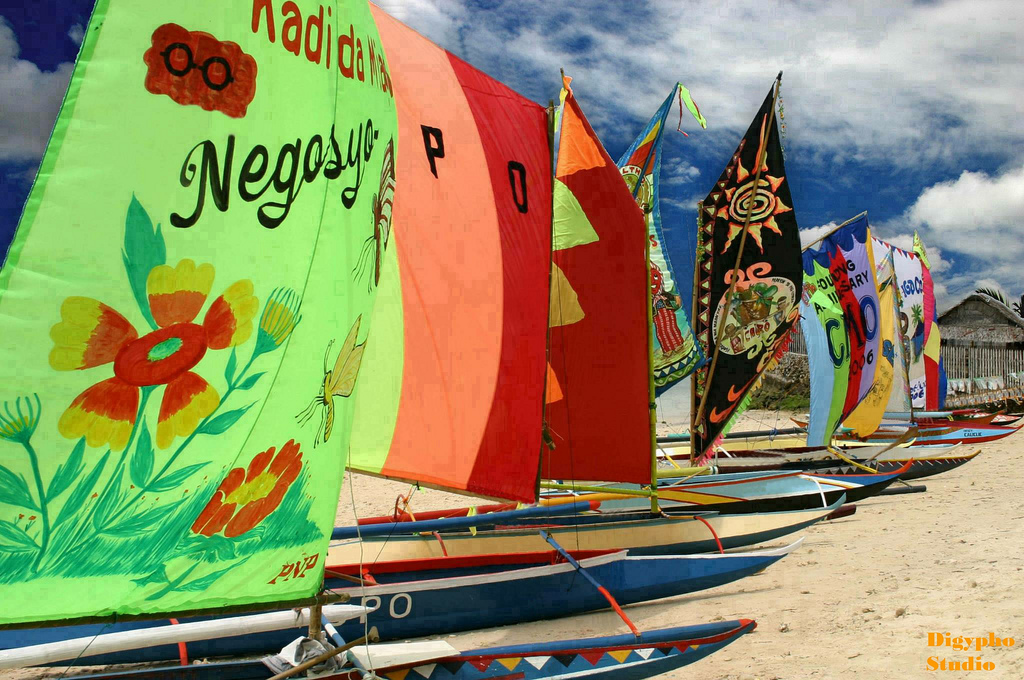
Bigiw with tanja, crab claw, and spritsails from the Island Garden City of Samal, Davao del Norte

Bigiw is a small double-outrigger sailboat native to the islands of Mindanao (particularly in the Island Garden City of Samal), Visayas, and Palawan in the Philippines. It is used for personal transport or small-scale fishing and can hold one to three people. It is traditionally propelled by sails and steered with a single oar, but is commonly motorized in modern times. It can also be paddled. The sail type used is predominantly triangular crab claw sails (banog pindang), but it can also use spritsails or tanja sails.

Bigiw is similar to the vinta and other small Philippine outrigger boats (bangka), but differs in that its prow and stern are not open or covered by flat decks but is uniquely knife-like and sharply-pointed. They are named after the bigiw, the local name for needlefish, due to its shape.

== See also ==
- Vinta
- Paraw
