= Mori Atas language =

Austronesian language spoken in Sulawesi, Indonesia

Mori Atas
- Native to: Indonesia
- Region: Sulawesi
- Native speakers: (28,000 with Mori Bawah cited 1988)
- Language family: Austronesian: Malayo-Polynesian; Celebic; Bungku–Tolaki; Western; Interior; Mori Atas

Language codes
- ISO 639-3: mzq
- Glottolog: mori1269

Mori Atas, also known as Upper Mori or West Mori, is an Austronesian language of the Celebic branch. The traditional Mori Atas homeland is the upper course of the Laa River in Central Sulawesi.

== Classification ==
Mori Atas is classified as a member of the Bungku-Tolaki group of languages, and shares its closest affinities with the Padoe language. Together, Mori Atas and Mori Bawah are sometimes referred to collectively by the cover term Mori.

== Dialects ==
Mori Atas presents a complicated dialect situation. Following Esser, five dialects can be regarded as principal.

- Molio’a
- Ulu’uwoi
- Tambee
- Molongkuni
- Impo
