= Mori language =

Austronesian language of Central Sulawesi, Indonesia

Mori
- Native to: Indonesia
- Region: Sulawesi
- Native speakers: (33,000 cited 1988–1991)
- Language family: Austronesian: Malayo-Polynesian; Celebic; Bungku–Tolaki; Mori

Language codes
- ISO 639-3: Variously: mzq – Mori Atas xmz – Mori Bawah pdo – Padoe
- Glottolog: None

In its broad sense, Mori is a cover term used to refer collectively to two languages of Central Sulawesi: Mori Bawah and Mori Atas. Sometimes a third language, Padoe, is also included.

== History of the term ==
Originally the term Mori referred only to certain clans living on the upper course of the Laa River in Central Sulawesi, that is, today's Mori Atas or 'Upper Mori' people. After the imposition of Dutch colonial rule in the early twentieth century, the name was extended to include peoples living eastward along the lower course of the Laa and in the Tambalako watershed (today's Mori Bawah or 'Lower Mori'), and southward to peoples around Lake Matano (including the Padoe). Although the languages of these areas were different, the people shared a similar culture, and at that time had also been united under the powerful ruler Mokole Marunduh.

In the present day, the situation has been reversed. Today Mori in its narrow sense refers principally to the Mori Bawah language, and even more specifically to the Tinompo dialect thereof, which colonial authorities promoted as a standard throughout the area.

== Classification and convergence ==
Using the historical-comparative method of linguistics, Mead has demonstrated that there is an ancient language divide running through the Mori area. Mori Atas and Padoe are more closely related to the Tolaki language than they are to Mori Bawah, while Mori Bawah shares its closest linguistic affinities with Bungku and other languages of the eastern seaboard of Sulawesi, such as Wawonii and Kulisusu. These old associations are clear from patterns of shared sound change, and they are also apparent in pronoun sets.

For example, the following table lists the independent pronouns in five languages. From this table it can be seen that Mori Bawah independent pronouns closely resemble those of Bungku, while Mori Atas and Padoe pronouns are closer to those of Tolaki.

	Tolaki	Padoe	Mori Atas	Mori Bawah	Bungku
1s	inaku	iaku	iaku	ongkue	ngkude
2s	inggo'o	iiko	iiko	omue	munde
3s	ie'i	umono	iwono	onae	nade
1p excl	inggami	ikami	ikami	omami	mami
1p incl	inggito	ikito	ikito	ontae	ntade
2p	inggomiu	ikomiu	ikomiu	omiu	miu
3p	ihiro	umboro	iworo	ondae	ndade

In light of such differences, it is improbable that the Mori Atas and Mori Bawah languages are inherently intelligible. However, because of cultural ties, commerce, and intermingling of their populations through local immigration, Mori Atas and Mori Bawah people are at least familiar with each other's languages, and the languages have been converging in terms of their wordstocks, as can be seen in relatively high percentages of shared lexical similarity.
