= Kodeoha language =

Austronesian language spoken in Sulawesi, Indonesia

Kodeoha
- Native to: Indonesia
- Region: Sulawesi
- Native speakers: (1,500 cited 1999)
- Language family: Austronesian: Malayo-Polynesian; Celebic; Bungku–Tolaki; Western; West Coast; Kodeoha

Language codes
- ISO 639-3: vko
- Glottolog: kode1237
- ELP: Kodeoha

Kodeoha (Kondeha) is an Austronesian language of Southeast Sulawesi, Indonesia.
