= Waru language =

Austronesian language spoken in Sulawesi, Indonesia

Waru
- Mopute
- Native to: Indonesia
- Region: Sulawesi
- Native speakers: (350 cited 1999)
- Language family: Austronesian: Malayo-Polynesian; Celebic; Bungku–Tolaki; Western; West Coast; Waru

Language codes
- ISO 639-3: wru
- Glottolog: waru1266
- ELP: Waru

Waru is an Austronesian language of Southeast Sulawesi, Indonesia.
