= Avang =

Traditional Philippine trading ship

Avang, also known as abang or pontin, is a traditional trading ship of the Ivatan people of the Philippines. It is the largest boat type among the Ivatan people and characteristically has a closed deck. It is about 14 to 18 m (46 to 59 ft) in length and about 5 m (16 ft) in height. It is slightly curving, with the bow and the stern higher than the central area. It has two masts made from woven mats of pandanus leaves, though these were later replaced with canvas cloth (kacha) in colonial times. It also has fifteen pairs of rowers. The avang resembles the vasinian boats of the Yami people. Avang are extinct, the last ship was dismantled in 1910.

== See also ==
- Falua
- Chinedkeran
- Tataya
- Balangay
- Bangka
- Awang (boat)
