= Chinarem =

Traditional boat of the Ivatan people

Chinarem was a traditional open-deck boat of the Ivatan people from the island of Sabtang in the Philippines. It was around 6 to 8 m (20 to 26 ft) long with three or four pair of rowers and a single mast. It was similar to the falua in shape, but differs in that the stern was pointed (hence its name). It can carry ten passengers and was generally used to ferry goods and people between the islands of Sabtang and Batan. Chinarem is extinct; it disappeared in Sabtang Island around the 1970s.

== See also ==
- Avang
- Panineman
- Tataya
- Balangay
- Bangka
