= Moronene language =

Austronesian language spoken in Sulawesi, Indonesia

Moronene
- Native to: Indonesia
- Region: Sulawesi
- Native speakers: (37,000 cited 2000)
- Language family: Austronesian: Malayo-Polynesian (MP); Celebic; Bungku–Tolaki; Moronene
- Dialects: Wita Ea (Rumbia, Poleang); Tokotu’a (Kabaena)

Language codes
- ISO 639-3: mqn
- Glottolog: moro1287

Moronene is an Austronesian language spoken in Bombana Regency, Southeast Sulawesi, Indonesia. It belongs to the Bungku–Tolaki branch of the Celebic subgroup.

== Phonology ==
Moronene has the following consonant inventory:

Consonants
			Labial	Alveolar	Retroflex	Velar	Glottal
Nasal			m	n		ŋ	
Plosive	voiceless	plain	p	t		k	ʔ
Plosive	voiceless	prenasalized	ᵐp	ⁿt		ᵑk	
Plosive	voiced	plain	b	d		g	
Plosive	voiced	prenasalized	ᵐb	ⁿd		ᵑg	
Fricative			β	s			h
Flap				r	ɽ		

The vowel phonemes are /a e i o u/. Sequences of two like vowels are pronounced as a long vowel, e.g. nee [ne:].

== Grammar ==
=== Word order ===
Moronene has flexible word order. However, there is a high frequency of clause-initial verbs in "connected narrative discourse." Noun phrases are not marked for case. The language has prepositions.

=== Pronouns ===
There are two forms of pronouns, free pronouns and absolutive clitics. There are singular and plural forms, there are no dual, trial or paucal forms. There is an inclusive/exclusive distinction in the first person plural forms. There is no gender, and there appears to be no present-day politeness distinction.

Moronene Free Pronouns and Absolutive Clitics
Person	Free	Absolutive
1SG	[i'?aku] ['?aku]	['aku] ~ [’?aku] ~ ['haku]
2SG	[i'tʃoʔo] ['tʃoʔo]	[ko]
3SG	[i'a:]	[o]~[?o]~[ho]
1PL (Inclusive)	[i'tʃita] ['tʃita]	['kita]
1PL (Exclusive)	[i'tʃami] ['tʃami]	['kami]
2PL	[itʃo'miu] [tʃo'miu]	[ko'miu]
3PL	[i'ʔiɾa] ['ʔiɾa]	['ʔiɾa]~['hiɾa]

=== Genitive pronouns ===
There are two classes of genitive pronouns in Moronene which must be learned by speakers, which is unique among Bungku–Tolaki languages. There are singular and plural forms; there are no dual, trial or paucal forms. There is an inclusive/exclusive distinction in the first person plural forms. Example (1) demonstrates the class 1 first person genitive pronoun in use with the noun 'hair'.

wulu-ngku
hair-1SG.GEN
'My hair'

Moronene Genitive Pronouns
Person	Class 1	Class 2
1SG	-ngku	-ku
2SG	-u,	-'u
3SG	-no	-no
1PL (EX.)	-mami	-mami
1PL (IN)	-nto,	-to
2PL	-miu	-miu
3PL	-ndo,	-do

=== Number ===
Moronene has a decimal numeral system.
