= Falua =

Traditional Philippine boat

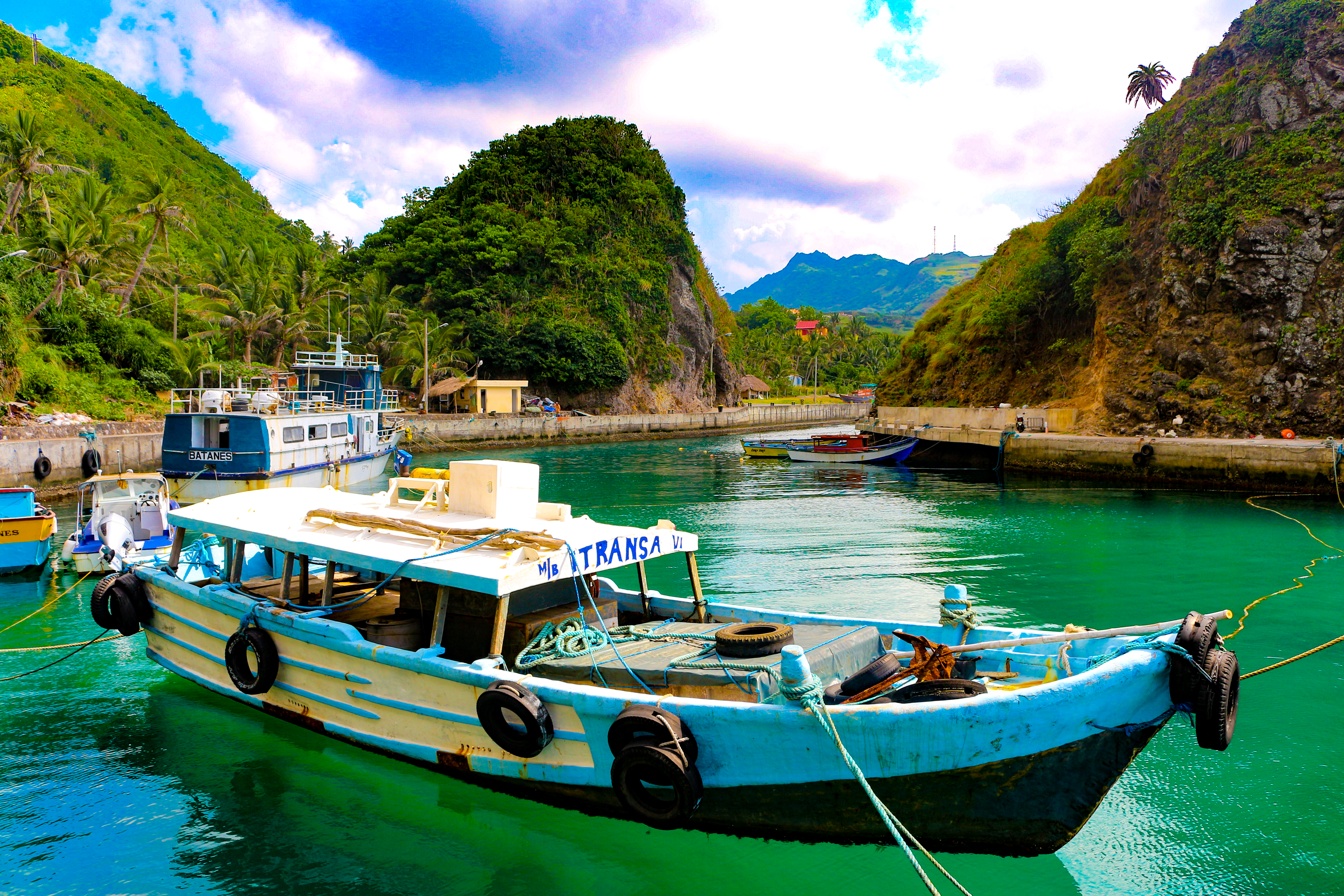
Modern motorized falua in Basco, Batanes

Falua, also spelled faluwa, is a traditional open-deck boat of the Ivatan people from the islands of Sabtang and Batan in the Philippines. It is about 8 to 12 m (26 to 39 ft) long and has one mast. It can also be propelled by six to ten pairs of rowers. It can carry thirty passengers and is used to ferry goods between the islands. Modern falua are generally motorized. Falua is similar in shape to the chinarem but differs in that it is usually larger and has a flat transom.

== See also ==
- Avang
- Chinedkeran
- Tataya
- Balangay
- Basnigan
- Bangka
