= Tataya =

Traditional small fishing boats of the Ivatan people in the Philippines

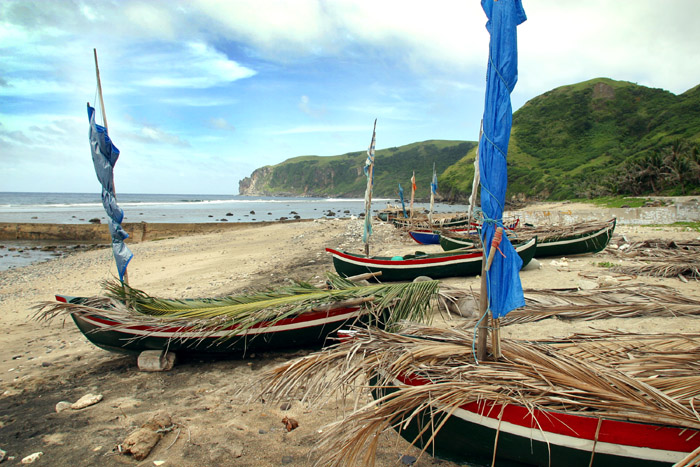
Fishing tataya with sails furled and covered with palm leaves in Batan Island

Tataya are traditional small fishing boats, with or without outriggers of the Ivatan people in the Philippines. They are generally round-hulled and powered by rowers or sails made from woven pandanus leaves. They have several variants based on size and island of origin. The term tataya can also be used for all traditional boats in the Batanes Islands in general, similar to the term bangka in the rest of the Philippines.

== Types ==
=== Size ===
The following are the traditional types of tataya based on size:

- Suhuan – also known as pangdayan or karakuhan, are the largest types of tataya. They are around 4 to 4.48 m (13.1 to 14.7 ft) long, 1.20 m (3.9 ft) wide, and 38 to 50 cm (15 to 20 in) deep. They can carry two rowers and one tiller, as well as an additional eight passengers.
- Pehan – shorter than the suhuan but proportionally wider. It has two pairs of thole pins (pasitan) for rowers. It is around 1.20 to 1.4 m (3.9 to 4.6 ft) to 3.5 to 3.8 m (11 to 12 ft) wide and 40 to 48 cm (16 to 19 in) deep.
- Paychanavangan – a small tataya used for hook and line fishing. It can carry two people, but is usually only crewed by one. It is 2.8 to 3 m (9.2 to 9.8 ft) in length and 0.98 to 1.35 m (3.2 to 4.4 ft) in width.
- Paychatanian – a single-person tataya. It is 2.8 to 3 m (9.2 to 9.8 ft) long, 0.98 to 1.1 m (3.2 to 3.6 ft) wide, and 38 to 45 cm (15 to 18 in) deep.
- Dinong – also known as viyung. A single-person tataya made from a single dugout canoe. It is around 2.8 m (9.2 ft) long, 92 cm (3.02 ft) wide, and 40 cm (16 in) deep.

=== Region ===
==== Batan ====
The tataya of Batan Island are generally divided into four types: the Basco and Mahato tataya, the Ivana tataya, and the Uyugan tataya.

Basco and Mahatao tataya share the same fishing grounds and thus are identical in construction. The boats are rounded with thin ribs (lagkaw) and four strakes (tavas) at the sides, including the topmost strake, the pamekpekan. The prow is raised higher than the rest of the boat.

Ivana tataya are built for maneuverability. Sitting slightly lower than Uyugan tataya. The ribs are squared and thin, while the keel (managad) and the lowest strakes (manpid) are carved from a single log. It does not have a plank-sheer (sintas) unlike other tataya.

Uyugan tataya are heavier than the other tataya. They are shorter than the Basco and Mahatao tataya. They sit higher than Sabtang and Ivana tataya on the water. The strakes are thick and they have an open side.

==== Itbayat ====
Tataya from the island of Itbayat are built for stability due to the rougher waters around the island. They have a wide body and a flat bottom. They have five strakes. The prow and the stern are also characteristically rounded, unlike those of other tataya which are pointed. It is the only type of tataya with outriggers (patid), which is generally reserved for the larger types of Ivatan boats. Other tataya do not have outriggers.

==== Sabtang ====
Tataya from the island of Sabtang have very shallow and pointed sterns. The thole pins are fastened to a third-tier plank (pinatapid) attached to the topmost strake (pamekpekan).

== See also ==
- Avang
- Chinarem
- Falua
- Ipanitika
- Balangay
- Bangka
