= Kulisusu language =

Austronesian language spoken in Sulawesi, Indonesia

Kulisusu
- Native to: Indonesia
- Region: Buton Island
- Native speakers: (23,000 cited 1999–2005)
- Language family: Austronesian: Malayo-Polynesian; Celebic; Bungku–Tolaki; Kulisusu

Language codes
- ISO 639-3: Variously: vkl – Kulisusu xkq – Koroni tlk – Taloki
- Glottolog: kuli1254 Kulisusu koro1311 Koroni talo1252 Taloki
- ELP: Taloki
- Koroni

Kulisusu is an Austronesian language (one of the Celebic languages) of Southeast Sulawesi, Indonesia. The Kulisusu language is spoken in the northern part of Buton Island. It is part of a dialect chain with two minor languages, Koroni and Taloki.
