= Tao people =

Ethnic group

Tao
Tao no pongso

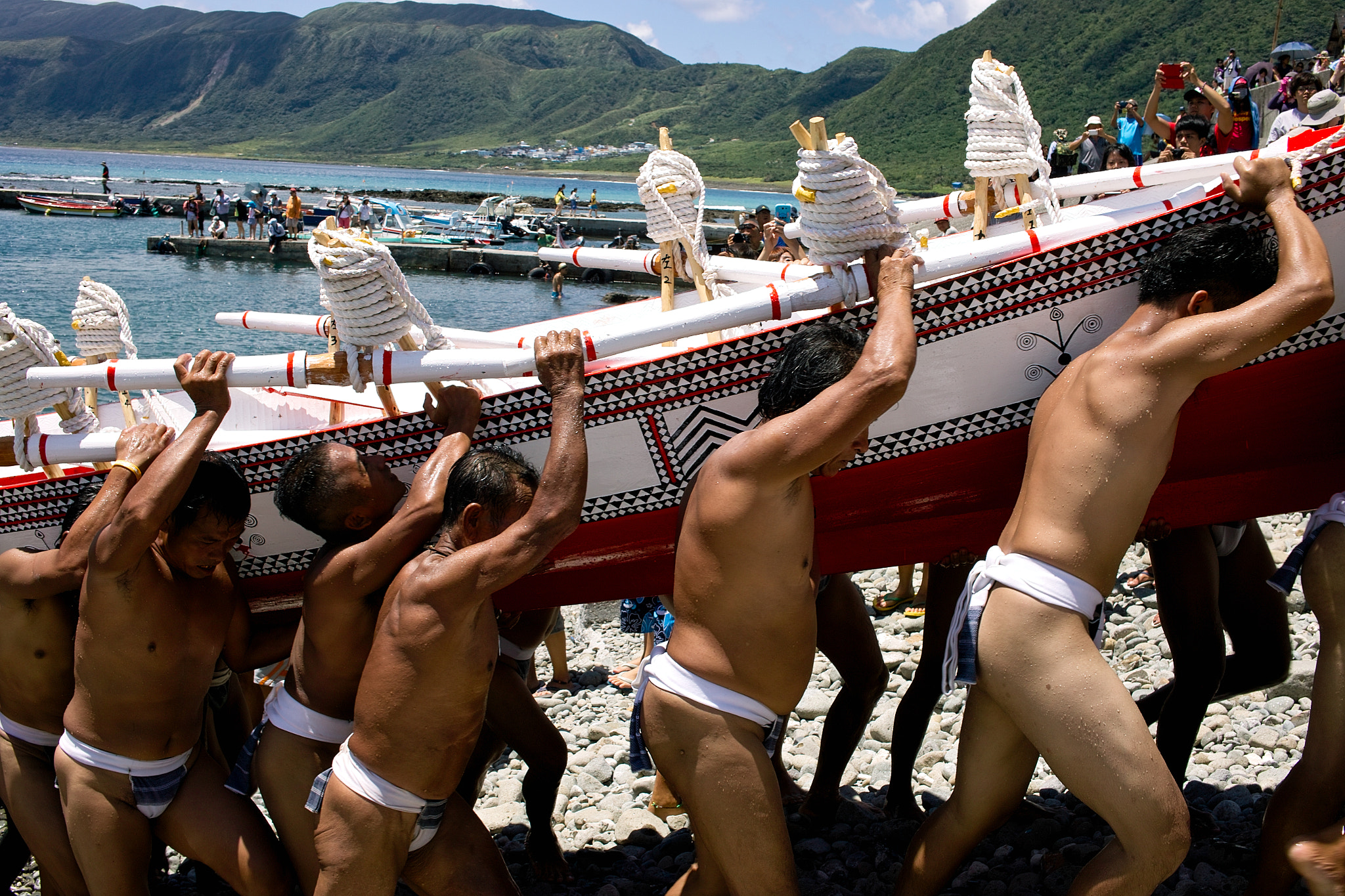
- Tao people carrying a traditional ipanitika fishing boat during the annual flying fish festival

Total population
- 4,701 (2020)

Regions with significant populations
- Orchid Island, Taiwan

Languages
- Yami (Tao), Mandarin

Religion
- Spiritual beliefs, Christianity

Related ethnic groups
- Ivatan people and other Ethnic groups of the Philippines, Native Taiwanese

The Tao people (Yami: Tao no pongso) are an Austronesian ethnic group native to the tiny outlying Orchid Island of Taiwan. They have a maritime culture, with great ritual and spiritual significance placed on boat-building and fishing. Their ways of life have been threatened by the continued emigration to the mainland of Taiwan in search of jobs and education. As a result, the continuation of past traditions has been hindered. Despite being linked to both other Taiwanese indigenous peoples and Batanic indigenous Filipino populations, the Tao people remain unique in their customs and cultural practices.

The Tao people have been more commonly recorded under the exonym "Yami people" by official documents and academic literature, following Japanese anthropologist Torii Ryuzo's coining of the name in 1897. Internally the Tao people have no consensus over the two names, so Council of Indigenous Peoples of the Taiwanese government uses both names side by side.

Citing threats to their culture and health, the Tao people have protested against the nuclear waste plant constructed on their island by the government in 1982 and advocated for its removal.

== Origin ==
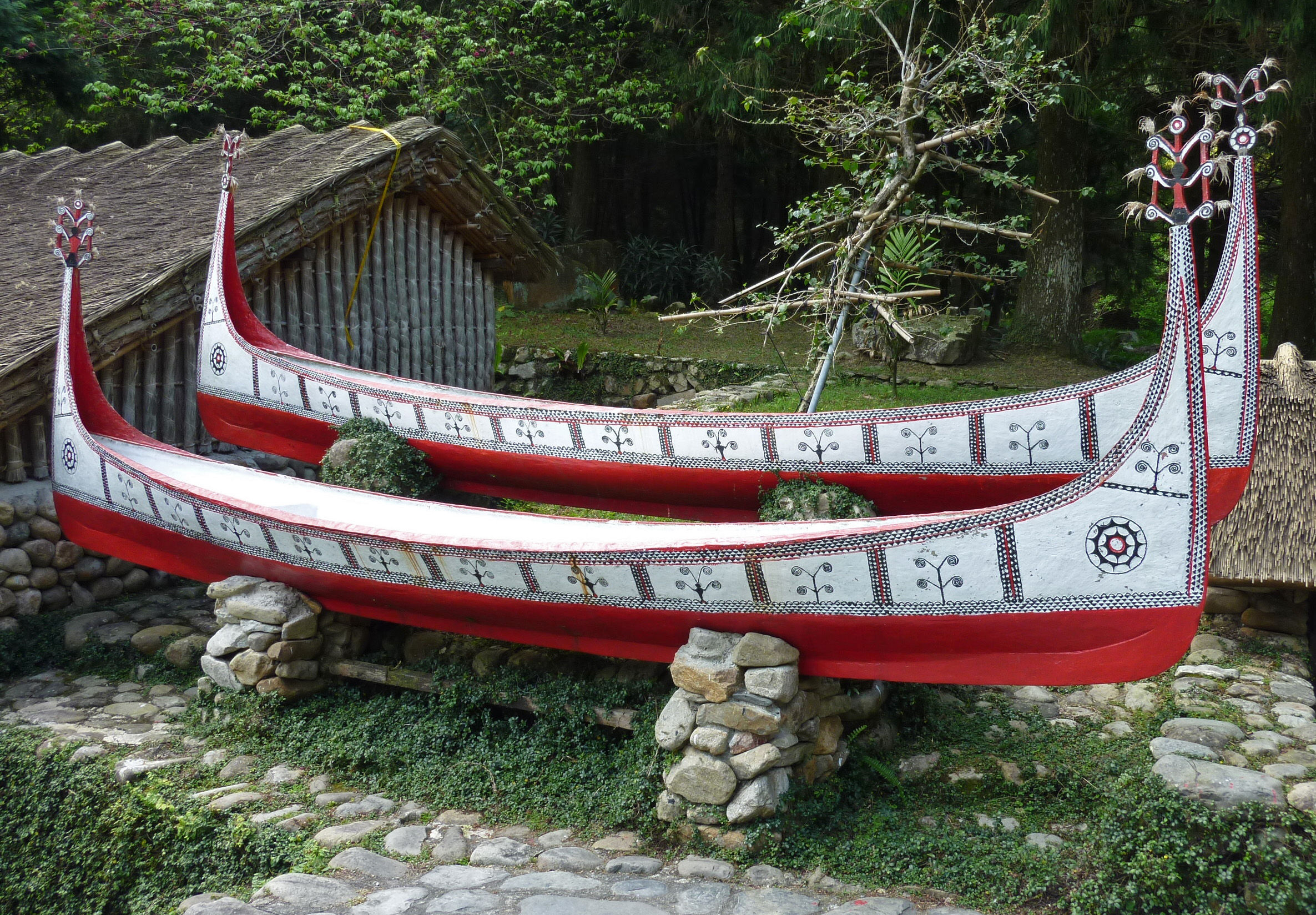
Tao ipanitika canoes at the Formosan Aboriginal Culture Village with moron-no-tatara ornaments at the bows and sterns. They are decorated with eye designs (mata-no-tatara) at both ends, and depictions of Magomaog, a legendary folk hero who taught boat-building to the Tao.

The Tao people are Austronesians, like other Taiwanese indigenous peoples. However, it is still unknown how they settled Orchid Island and from where. Unlike other indigenous Taiwanese groups, they speak a Western Malayo-Polynesian language and are presumed to be more closely related to the ethnic groups of the Philippines, particularly the Ivatan people. A common theory tracing their ancestry posits that their ancestors left the Batanes Archipelago in the Philippines, and settled Orchid Island approximately 800 years ago. This reasoning is based primarily on the language similarities of the Ivatan and the Tao people. Also, it appears that these two groups traded goats, pigs, weapons, and gold until about 300 years ago due to continuous warfare. Tao oral history also narrates that their ancestors originated from the Ivatan people of the Batanes islands.

A 2011 genetic study, although not conclusive, found that the Tao people are more genetically closely related to the other Taiwanese indigenous peoples in the Taiwanese mainland than to the Ivatan people of the Philippines. However, the Tao and the Ivatan both speak closely related Western Malayo-Polynesian languages, and there is evidence of limited gene flow between the groups. The authors concluded that Orchid Island was settled independently from Taiwan during the early period of the Austronesian expansion (approximately 4000 BP), and not from the Batanes Islands as previously believed. Long-term trade contacts and limited intermarriage resulted in strong cultural and linguistic exchanges between the groups in subsequent millennia.

In addition to the Tao people of Orchid Island, there is a growing population of ethnic Chinese/Han Taiwanese individuals. This adds approximately 1,000 people to the number of inhabitants on the island.

== Name ==
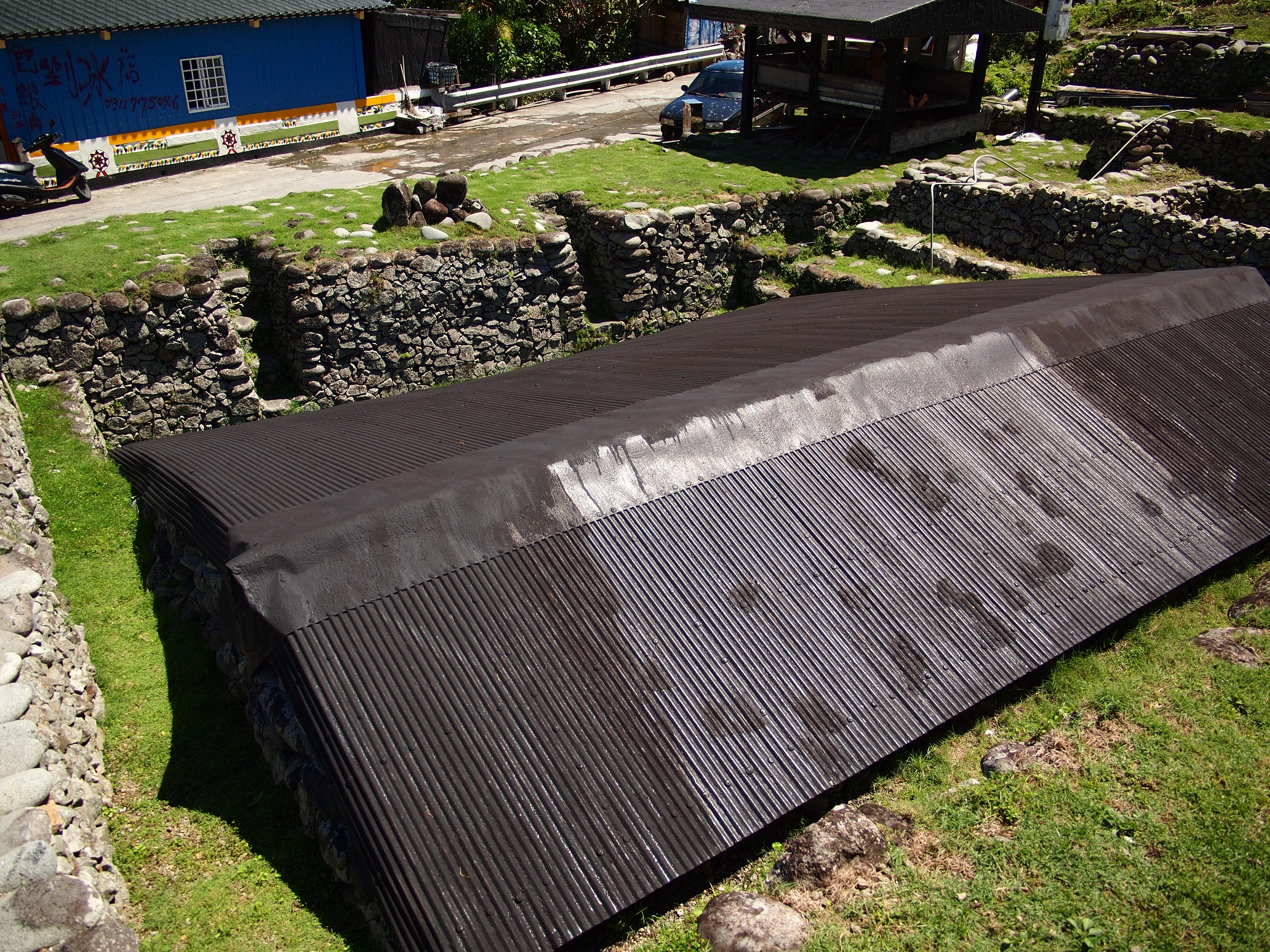
Traditional Tao dwelling built partially underground

The word Tao simply means "person"/"human" in the language of the Tao people. The word Yami (meaning "north") originated from Japanese ethnologist Torii Ryūzō. He used the term to refer to the culture and language of the Tao people. In recent years, some Tao people have rejected the name, but opinion remains divided. While this indigenous group identifies collectively by the name Tao or Yami, individual communities on the island affiliate with unique names tied to their locality.

== Language ==
The language of the Tao people can be referred to simply as Tao or Yami. Natively, it is referred to as ciriciring no tao ("speech of human beings"). It is a Malayo-Polynesian language, a subgroup of Austronesian languages. More specifically, it is considered a Western Malayo-Polynesian language, one of two primary branches in the Austronesian subgroup—the other being Central-Eastern Malayo-Polynesian. The Tao language is a member of the Batanic languages and is grouped together with the Ivatan and Itbayat languages of the Philippines. As of 1994, there were a total of 3,000 speakers, and 3,255 individuals deemed ethnically Tao.

== Geography ==
Orchid Island (Chinese: 蘭嶼; pinyin: Lányǔ; Tâi-lô: Lân-sū) is known by the Tao people as Pongso no Tao ("island of human beings"), Irala ("facing the mountain"), or Ma'ataw ("floating in the sea"). It is located approximately 40 miles off the southeastern coast of Taiwan, and directly north of the Batanes Islands of the Philippines. It is a small island of about 45 square kilometers with an estimated total population of 4,000 inhabitants. It was originally referred to as Hongtou Island (Red Head Island) by the Han Chinese; however, it was officially renamed Orchid Island in 1947 for its rich orchid production. There are very few plains on the island; instead, its geography is composed of steep mountains and hilly terrain. Most villages are located at mountain bases, because river run-off is an ample source of fresh water.

== History ==
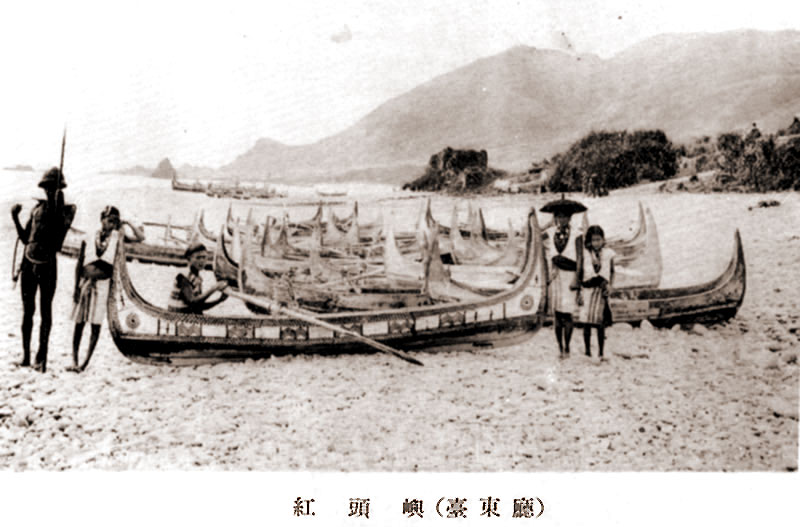
Old photo of the Tao people on the shore of Orchid Island, near Taiwan published in a Japanese colonial government publication, ca. 1931

In 1877, the Qing dynasty claimed Orchid Island as part of its Chinese empire, but was unable to rule effectively. The island was ceded to Japan along with Taiwan in 1895. Japan's rule of the island lasted from 1895 to 1945. During this time, the government declared the island off limits to outsiders, and deemed it an ethnological research area. The Japanese government heavily monitored any outside influence that might drastically interfere with the Tao people's ways of life. As a result, the Tao culture remains the best-preserved among all Taiwanese indigenous peoples.

Following Japan's defeat in World War II, the Republic of China took control of Orchid Island in 1945. Tourism was introduced to the island in 1967, leading to increasing modernization among the Tao people.

== Culture ==
=== Ritual and religion ===
Due to Westernization, their indigenous beliefs have melded with Christian practices. As a result, they have a belief system made of components from ancestral beliefs and Christian ideologies. Ancestral Tao belief systems consisted of several layers, each host to a variety of gods and spirits. The first layer is home to the main god, Simo-Rapao, who oversees all other gods. According to Tao mythology, he created the Earth's first two individuals from a piece of rock, and a piece of bamboo. He doles out punishment, and is responsible for all natural calamities that affect the island. Sio-Mima is native of the second layer of the Tao cosmogony. He is believed to control the rest of the world, deemed dominated by white people. The third level is home to Si-Toriao and Si-Lovolovoin. Si Toriao allegedly controls the rain and lightning, while Si-Lovolovoin serves as a messenger to all of the gods. In the final layer of their ancient religious belief system resides the malevolent gods who may punish the Tao peoples with invasions of caterpillars and locusts.

Ancestral Tao people believed that goddesses were responsible for the birth of their children. According to their lore, there were separate goddesses for each gender. These goddesses dictated the births and lifetimes of the Tao populace. The length of an individual's life was determined by cracking a coconut and the measurement of the outpouring juice.

While their ancestral religious system was based on the dictates of gods, the Tao people rarely adhere to such a stringent belief system today. Instead, their belief system is intermixed with components of Christianity and remnants of their past beliefs. Today, many Tao people have converted to a Christianity (especially branches of Catholicism and Protestantism). However, much of their traditional Christian ideologies are muddied with adherence to ancient superstitions. The Tao people greatly fear anito, the collection of evil spirits, even more than they worship an omnipotent God. They believe that when an individual passes away, his or her soul travels to Malavang a Pongso, the White Island, while the rest of the minor souls from within become anito. As a result of this belief, they have an uncontrollable fear of the dead. When a Tao individual is near death, relatives and friends stand beside his or her deathbed in full battle regalia in order to fight off evil spirits. Once the funeral has commenced, attendees catch crab and fish to be cooked and eaten on that day in remembrance of the deceased.

There is no specific ceremony for the entrance into adulthood. A boy is considered an adult when he reaches the age of 18 or 19, and a girl is considered an adult when she turns 16 or 17. A Tao man is deemed eligible for marriage when he participates in a fishing team and can accomplish his fishing duties on his own. For women, they have to be proficient at taro cultivation and fabric weaving. Once the two parties are of marrying capabilities, relatives of both families formally propose to the woman's parents through the giving of presents. If her parents accept these offerings, they equivocally accept the proposal.

=== Fishing and ceremony ===
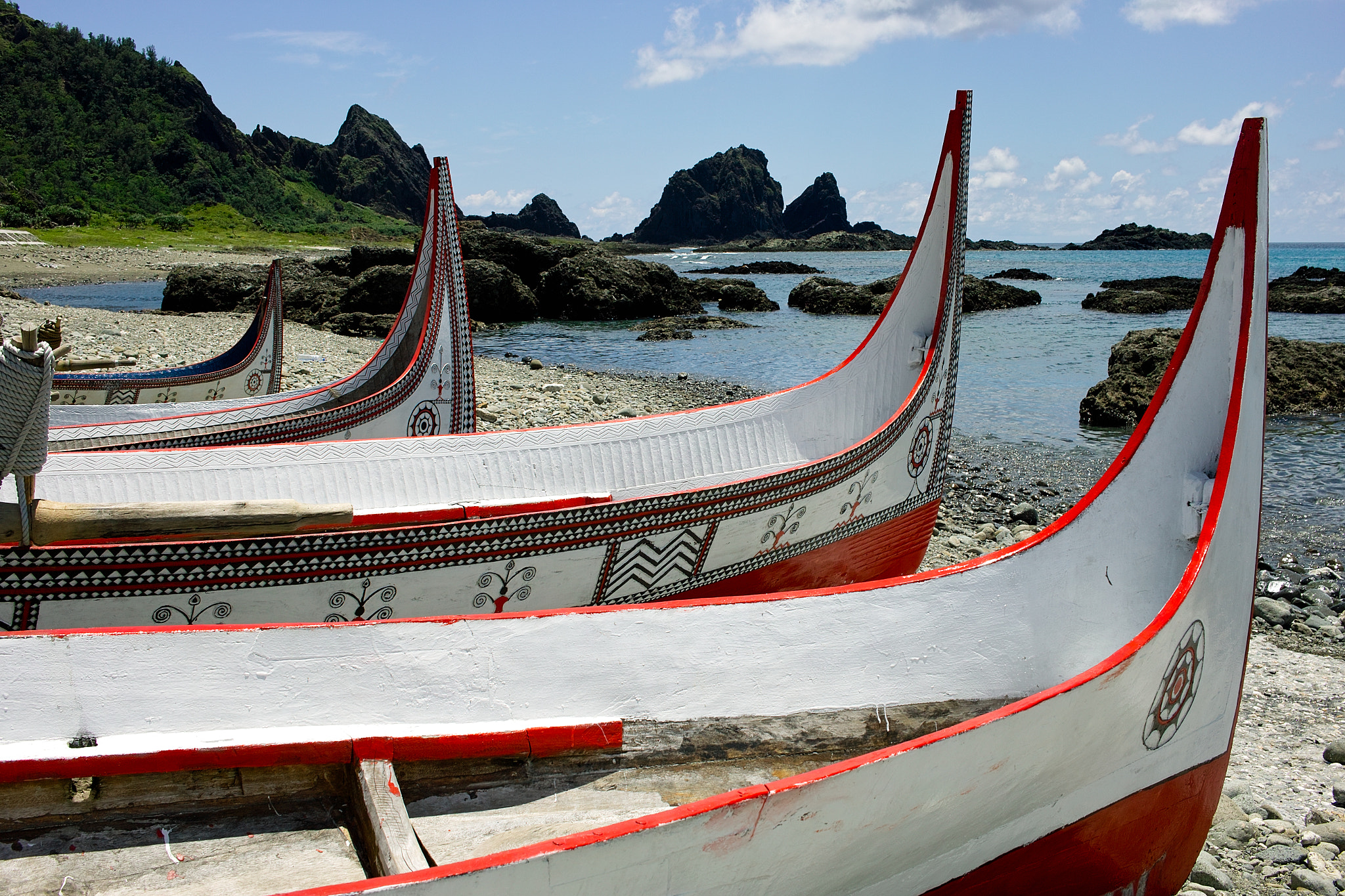
The tatala, traditional Tao boats

The Tao people are the only Taiwanese indigenous people with a maritime culture. The Tao peoples divide their year into three separate fishing seasons: rayon, teyteyka, and amyan. Rayon is equivalent to spring, and spans from February to May. This is considered to be flying fish season, during which the men catch fish for ceremonial use. Teyteyka lasts from June to October, and signifies the end of the period of time in which flying fish can be caught on the surface. Finally, the amyan season signifies the time of year spent waiting for the flying fish to return. This season lasts from November to January. During the latter two seasons, fish cannot be caught for ceremonial use. During these off seasons, the Tao people are charged with producing goods and recreation. Fishing is the main way in which Tao men can make a living on the island.

A crucial component of Tao life centers upon the building of their fishing boats. As a device used for their sole method of securing sustenance and monetary gain, they place great emphasis on the production of these boats. They make their boats using multiple wooden planks shaped with an ax. Due to their boats not being made from a single tree trunk or log, they cannot be considered canoes. They join the wooden planks together with dowels and rattan. Once they have successfully constructed the boat, they carve patterns and paint them using the traditional red, white, and black. They then adorn the bow and stern of the boat with chicken feather decorations. The hull of the boat typically consists of three main patterns: human figure, eye of the boat, and waves. The human figure symbolizes heroism through the representation of the earliest Tao man. The eye of the boat consists of a variety of concentric circles edged with triangles. Their composition represents the sun's rays, and is considered to ward off evil spirits that may cause disasters at sea. They typically make boats to seat 1–3 people, 6 people, 8 people, or 10 people. However, no matter the size of the boat, the shape remains consistent. The bow and the stern of the boat are both steep, upward arcs that allow for stability and sharp turns. They consider a boat an extension of man's body, and thus, boat building is deemed a sacred mission. For the Tao, boat building is the ultimate creation of beauty.

Once the building of the boat is completed, the boat's owner will host a large launching ceremony. To celebrate, Tao women wear their agate bead necklaces and octagonal wooden hats a few days prior to the actual event. On the actual day of the launching ceremony, the Tao people gather and slaughter pigs as a sacrifice, and the boat owner offers meat and taro to all of the families in his community. The men, dressed in traditional garb, circle the launching boat performing ceremonial rituals to ward off evil spirits before sending it into the water. They also throw the boat in the air several times prior to launch. The ceremony is deemed complete once the boat has remained afloat.

=== Attire and dress ===
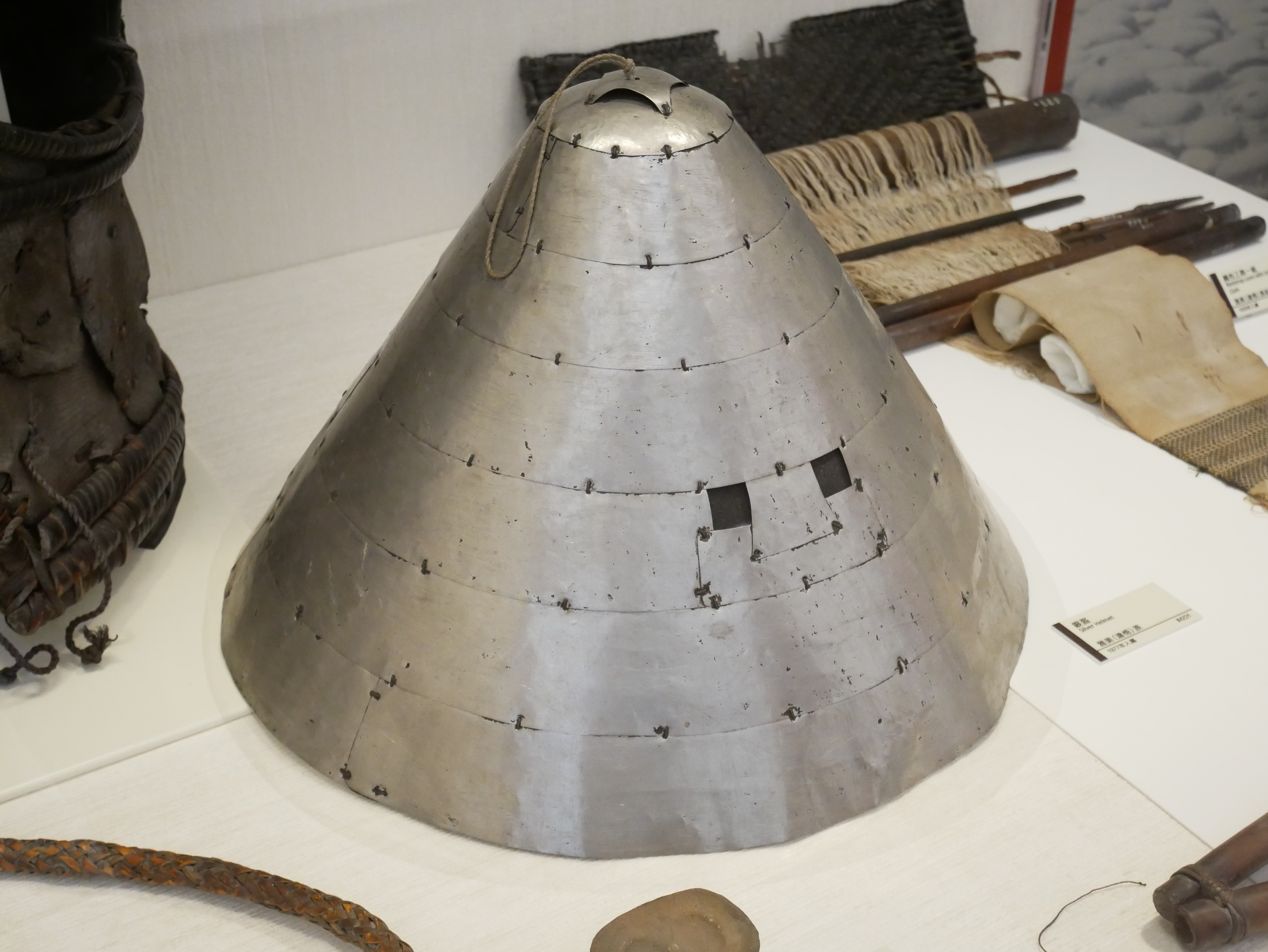
Helmet made of tin

Those of the Yami tribe have traditional clothing with designs described as belonging to the simpler side, unlike many other surrounding local indigenous tribes of Taiwan. Fibers of the flax plant and banana leaf, but then later more commonly cotton, were used to create clothes of white, black, and navy colors. Due to the indigenous group having no head and/or class system, clothing was equal amongst the people, even those who were technically more personally wealthy than others.

Women wore pair square-clothed shirts accompanied by a short skirt. It would be common to see a woman with a large piece of cloth that has four longitudinal strips of white, black, or navy blue sewn together. Short skirts have three white and black or navy blue longitudinal stripes at each end, while five or six-year-old girls wear only one piece. Men wear loincloths, vests and T-bands on their upper body. Jackets have white, black, or navy stripes on the front and back. A common men’s vest design would consist of white nylon fabric with five white and eleven navy horizontal lines woven with navy cotton thread clamp, and the whole garment is hemmed with white nylon thread and two plastic buttons at the front inner waist. T-bands are woven black or navy at both ends.

For special or ceremonial occasions, men and women wear blue and white vests in addition to vibrant accessories, such as an octagonal wooden hat for women, and silver helmets for men. During funerals and times of mourning, women wear their upper garments inside out, and men wear a piece of cloth, reverse side out, on their heads. It is also considered taboo to wear clothing with an odd number of blue or black stripes. Therefore, clothing patterns typically consist of 8 to 12 stripes. Neither in ritualistic or everyday situations do the Tao people wear shoes.

== Diet ==
The Tao people's production methods are divided into two primary categories: agriculture and fishing. Due to taro's ability to grow in a wide array of climates, it is a vital part of the Tao diet. The Tao people plant taro on the narrow coastal plains, and thus their diet consists of wetland taro and taro sweet potatoes. Their food is divided into two groups: kanen and yakan. Kanen is considered an entrée similar to rice, and yakan is deemed a side dish. Women are charged the task of collecting and cooking the kanen, while men are supposed to search for the yakan.

A crucial aspect of the Tao daily diet is seafood. While men are primarily charged with fishing duties, women are responsible for gathering shells, seaweed, and smaller fish from holes along the shore. The men practice both spear and net fishing as a means of sustenance. All fish are categorized as either rahed or oyod. Rahed fish is deemed bad, and thus only eaten by men. The oyod fish is considered the real fish and can be eaten by both men and women.

== Government relations ==
The Council of Indigenous Peoples is a Taiwanese cabinet-level government body that serves the needs of the country's indigenous populations. The Tao people are one of sixteen aborigine populations represented by the council. The Tao people have no formal hierarchical structure. When disputes arise, the involved families are called upon to resolve the situation. Social affairs are governed by the male heads of families and members of the fishing community.

In 1967, the Taiwanese government stepped in to provide the Tao people concrete homes, an act which the aboriginal community deemed an affront to their culture. However, most Tao live in these homes now with the addition of open-air pavilions. Due to the island's relative remoteness, it lacks the equivalent infrastructure in transportation, health care or education in comparison to the main island. However, in 2007, an official of the Council of Indigenous Peoples stated that it would raise its budget to help the aboriginal groups of Taiwan.

== Nuclear waste ==
The Taiwan Power Company (Taipower) completed construction of Orchid Island's nuclear waste storage facility in 1982. The facility houses waste from Taiwan's three operating nuclear power plants. Since its construction, 98,700 barrels of waste have been deposited on the island.

Since its construction, the storage facility has been met with opposition. Due to language barriers, the Tao people were not aware that a nuclear storage facility was being erected on their island. During its construction, workers told the islanders that they were building a food cannery that would help the local economy. In 1987, when the Tao people finally learned of the dangers of nuclear waste, they began protests that lasted for more than twenty years. In the decades since the storage facility was constructed, there have been reports of increased cancer rates. In 2007, Taipower promised to remove all nuclear waste by 2016. On 22 November 2019, the government awarded $2.55 billion NTD ($83.6 million USD) to Orchid Island residents as compensation for the nuclear waste storage facility, which was determined to have been constructed without their knowledge or consent.

== See also ==
- Taitung County
- First Return Voyage in 300 Years
