= BHZ =

BHZ or bhz can refer to:

- Bosnian-Herzegovinian Greens, an environmentalist political party in Bosnia and Herzegovina
- Greater Belo Horizonte, a metropolitan area in Brazil, by IATA airport code; see IATA airport code#Cities with multiple commercial airports
- Bada language, a language spoken in Indonesia, by ISO 639-3 code
- BHZ, a model of engine manufactured by the Volkswagen Group; see List of Volkswagen Group petrol engines
- BHZ, a film and advertisement music selection company that is part of the music label Motor Music
- Bihara train station, in Assam, India
- Joinvilleaceae, a family of flowering plants native near the Pacific Ocean, by Catalogue of Life code
- BHZ, a code for certain railroad cars in New South Wales, Australia; see New South Wales HUB type carriage stock

== See also ==
- BHZ Capital Management LP, a financial analysis firm cofounded by Yaron Brook
