= Lindu (district) =

Coordinates: 1°19′48″S 120°02′55″E

- District
- Interactive map of Lindu
- Country: Indonesia
- Province: Central Sulawesi
- Regency: Sigi Regency

Area
  - Total: 552.03 km^{2} (213.14 sq mi)

Population (mid 2022 estimate)
  - Total: 5,949
  - Density: 10.78/km^{2} (27.91/sq mi)
- Time zone: UTC+8

Lindu is a district of Sigi Regency in Central Sulawesi province, Indonesia. The district concsist of five villages and has its seat in Tomado village. The district has total area of 552.03 square kilometers and had population of 5,949 people as of 2022. The most populated village of the district is Olu with population of 1,966 people in 2022, while the most densely populated village is Puroo with density of 22 people per square kilometre. The district is located inside the Lore Lindu National Park and also contains the Lindu Lake.

== History ==
The district was initially created by Donggala Regency government on 2008 based on Regional Law Number 8 of 2008 before the creation of the Sigi Regency. The native inhabitants of the region are To-Lindu people.

== Culture ==
To-Lindu people who inhabited the district mostly lives in social structures centered around Poboya or villages, mainly in Langko, Tomado, and Anca. They have Suoribunde which is their second house owned by families combined with their personal small garden producing foods, where they spend most of their time on as opposed to their actual house. This is to tend their garden, prepare for transport of the goods to the towns, as well as protecting their plants from wild boars.

The culture around the region held high regards of the Lindu Lake, with various folk legends dedicated to the lake and its formation.

== Economy ==
The district is mainly focused on agriculture with 989 hectares of land dedicated to cocoa plantation and 589 hectares to coffee plantation as of 2022. In addition, the district in 2022 has cultivated area for chili pepper of 7 hectares, from which it produces 22.1 tonnes during the same year.

== Administrative division ==
Lindu has five villages. They are listed below with their respective population as of 2022.

- Puroo (878)
- Langko (936)
- Tomado (1,415)
- Anca (754)
- Olu (1,966)

== Infrastructure ==
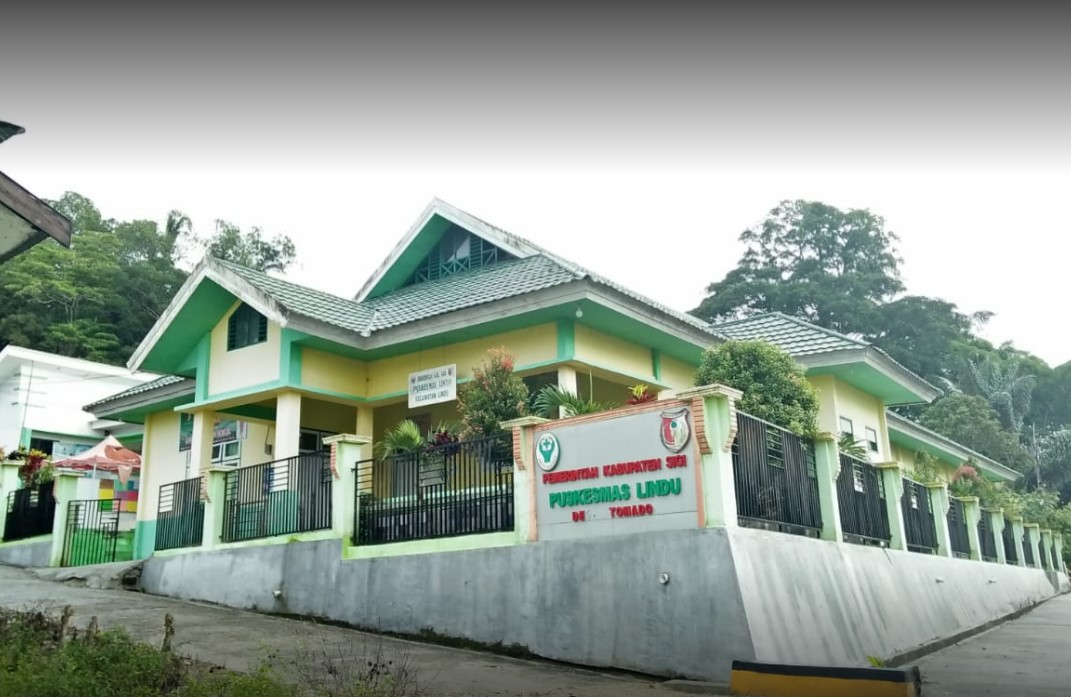
Lindu Puskesmas in Lindu District

The district as of 2022 has 12 kindergartens, 14 elementary schools, 2 junior highschools, as well as 2 senior highschools and one vocational highschool. The district also has 9 mosques, 20 Protestant churches, and 2 Catholic churches as of 2022. On communication infrastructure, the district has 2 base transceiver station with access to 4G as of 2022 according to Statistics Indonesia. On healthcare infrastructure, the district is served only by one puskesmas and 11 healthcare posts as of 2022.
