= Rampi =

Rampi may refer to:

- Rampi people, an ethnic group of Sulawesi, Indonesia
- Rampi language, a language spoken by the Rampi people

== People with the surname ==
- Alfredo Rampi (1975–1981)
- Francesco Rampi (born 1991), Italian footballer
