= Seko languages =

Subgroup of the Austronesian language family

Seko
- Geographic distribution: Sulawesi, Indonesia
- Linguistic classification: Austronesian: Malayo-Polynesian; South Sulawesi; Seko
- Subdivisions: Seko Padang; Seko Tengah; Panasuan; Budong-Budong

Language codes
- Glottolog: seko1241

The Seko languages are a group of four closely related Austronesian languages spoken in West Sulawesi and South Sulawesi provinces, Indonesia. They make up a primary branch of the South Sulawesi subgroup. The languages of the Seko branch are: Seko Padang, Seko Tengah, Panasuan and Budong-Budong.

The Badaic languages (namely Bada, Besoa, and Napu) are classified by Zobel (2020) with the Seko languages as part of a Seko–Badaic group within the South Sulawesi branch.
