= Bxd =

bxd or BXD may refer to:

- The bithoraxoid gene, bxd
- The ticker symbol for the CBOE DJIA BuyWrite Index (BXD)
- Bade Airport in Indonesia
- BXD, a planned line on the Luas light rail system in Dublin, Ireland
- Buxted railway station in south east England
- BXD, former subsidiary of Drecom, Ltd., which was purchased by Bandai Namco Entertainment in 2020 and renamed to Bandai Namco Nexus
