= Sigi Regency =

Regency in Central Sulawesi, Indonesia

Sigi Regency Kabupaten Sigi
- Regency
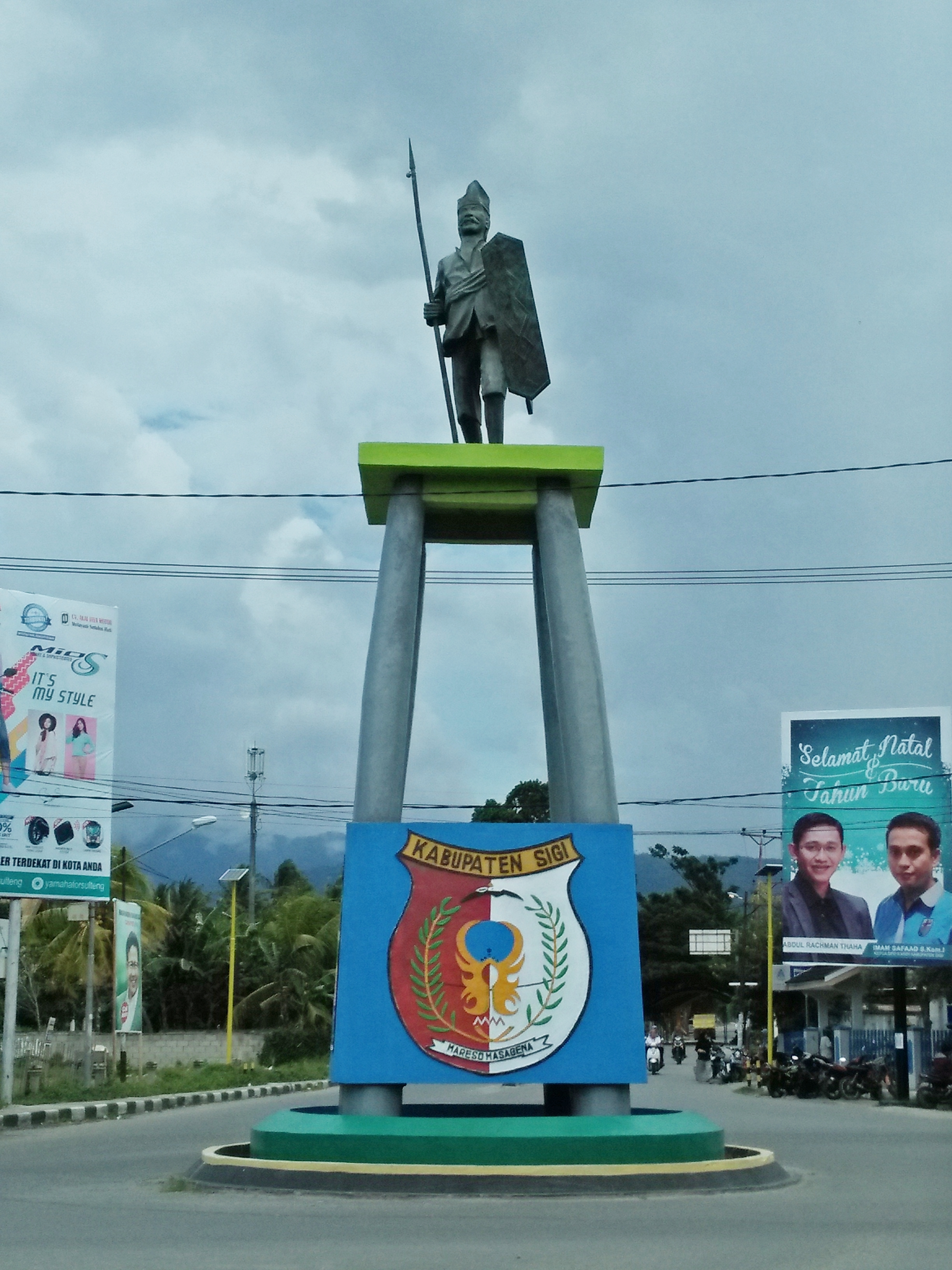
- Monument in Sigi Biromaru

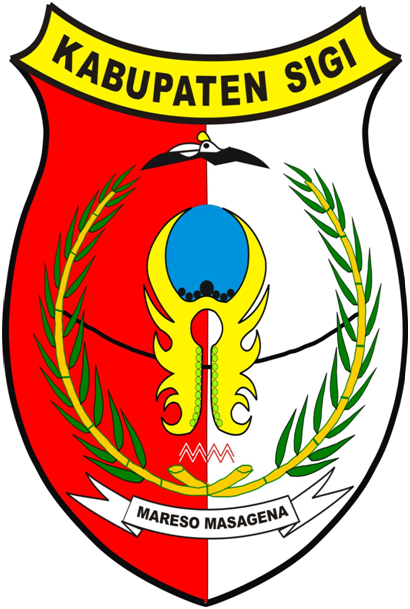
- Coat of arms
- Motto: Mareso Masagena (Kaili) (Difficult and Happy to be Together)
- Location within Central Sulawesi

- Location in Sulawesi and Indonesia Sigi Regency (Indonesia)
- Coordinates: 1°23′06″S 119°58′01″E
- Country: Indonesia
- Province: Central Sulawesi
- Capital: Sigi Biromaru

Government
  - Regent: Mohammad Rizal Intjenae
  - Vice Regent: Samuel Yansen Pongi

Area
  - Total: 5,225.44 km^{2} (2,017.55 sq mi)

Population (mid 2025 estimate)
  - Total: 279,104
  - Density: 53.4125/km^{2} (138.338/sq mi)
- Time zone: UTC+8 (ICST)
- Area code: (+62) 451
- Website: sigikab.go.id

Sigi Regency is a regency of Central Sulawesi, Indonesia. It was created on 21 July 2008 by splitting off the southern districts from Donggala Regency. It lies upstream on the Palu River, and immediately south of Palu city, the provincial capital. The regency is almost landlocked. It has a small coastline between Palu city and the western part of Donggala regency. It covers an area of 5,225.44 km^{2} and had a population of 215,030 at the 2010 Census and 239,421 at the 2020 Census; the official estimate as of mid-2025 was 279,104 (comprising 143,006 males and 136,098 females). The principal town lies at Sigi Biromaru.

The northern part of the Sigi Regency was one of the areas in northwest Sulawesi most affected by the 2018 earthquake and tsunami in Sulawesi. Dozens of people were reported to have been killed by the earthquake and there were reports of "massive liquification" which caused homes to be swept away.

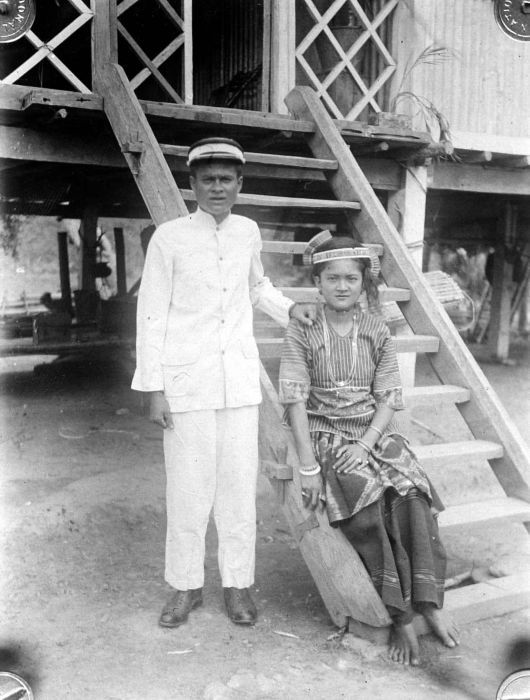
Prince and princess of Kulawi

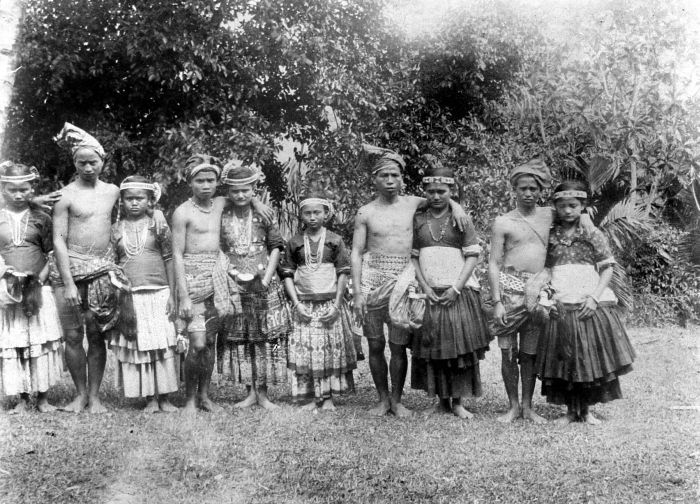
Marego dancers in Kulawi

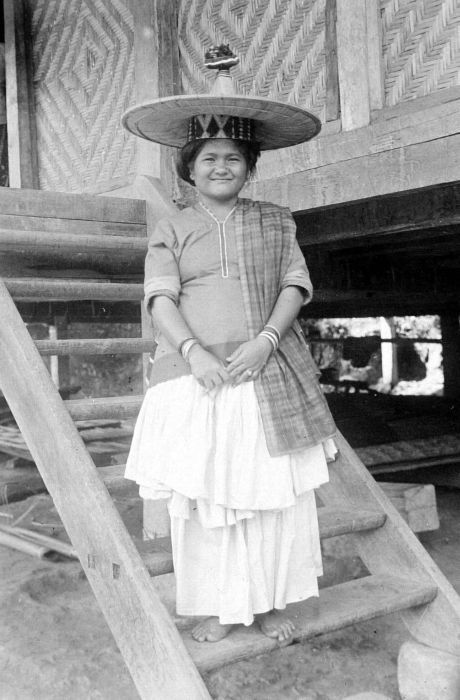
Woman in traditional dress in Kulawi

== Conflicts ==
Following religious conflicts in the neighbouring Poso Regency, the Indonesia government mounted Operation Tinombala in early 2016 to combat local terrorist activities carried out by the East Indonesia Mujahiddin (Mujahiddin Indonesian Timur, or MIT) in the province. In late November 2020, there were indications that the conflict had spread into Sigi Regency when four residents of remote Lembantongoa village were killed in an apparent terrorist attack attributed to MIT. Indonesia's senior Coordinating Political, Legal and Security Minister Mahfud MD issued a statement saying that the government was committed to tracking down those responsible for the murders and the accompanying destruction.

== Administrative districts ==
The Sigi Regency was divided at 2010 and at 2020 into fifteen districts (kecamatan), but on 14 September 2020 a sixteenth district (Sigi Kota) was formed from parts of Sigi Biromaru (7 desa), Dolo (2 desa) and Palolo (1 desa) Districts. The districts are tabulated below with their areas and their populations at the 2010 Census and 2020 Census, together with the official estimates as of mid-2025. The table also includes the locations of the district administrative centres, and the numbers of villages (all rated as rural desa) in each district.

For ease of reference, they are grouped below into two sectors (which have no administrative function); the southern group forms the geographically larger but less well populated part of the regency in the extensive valley of the Palu River, with an average population density of 27 per km^{2}, while the northern group forms the geographically smaller but more populated and faster-growing area to the immediate south of the city of Palu, with an average population density of over 204 per km^{2}. The southern part includes the large Lore Lindu National Park.

Kode Wilayah	Name of District (kecamatan)	Area in km^{2}	Pop'n Census 2010	Pop'n Census 2020	Pop'n Estimate mid 2025	Admin centre	No. of desa
72.10.07	Pipikoro	956.13	7,817	8,720	9,624	Peana	19
72.10.06	Kulawi Selatan (South Kulawi)	418.12	8,473	9,440	10,210	Lawua	12
72.10.05	Kulawi	1,053.56	14,172	15,810	16,662	Bolapopo	16
72.10.04	Lindu	552.03	4,690	5,250	6,473	Tomado	5
72.10.03	Nokilalaki	75.19	5,626	6,260	6,249	Kamarora	5
72.10.02	Palolo	581.48	27,385	30,440	30,791	Makmur	21
73.10.08	Gumbasa	176.49	11,682	13,010	13,397	Pakuli	7
72.10.10	Tanambulava	56.33	7,866	8,770	10,162	Sibalaya Utara	5
72.10.09	Dolo Selatan (South Dolo)	584.71	14,448	16,080	18,440	Baluase	12
Sub-totals	Southern sector	4,454.04	102,159	113,771	122,008		102
72.10.11	Dolo Barat (West Dolo)	112.18	12,576	14,010	15,878	Kalele	12
72.10.12	Dolo	21.79	20,591	22,930	24,827	Kota Pulu	9
72.10.01	Sigi Biromaru	175.29	42,857	47,710	48,797	Mpanau	10
72.10.14	Marawola	38.65	20,991	23,360	31,576	Binangga	11
72.10.15	Marawola Barat (West Marawola)	150.51	6,382	7,100	5,681	Dombu	12
72.10.13	Kinovaro	70.38	9,474	10,540	11,874	Porame	10
72.10.16	Sigi Kota (Sigi Town)	173.10	^{(a)}	^{(a)}	18,463	Bora	11
Sub-totals	Northern sector	741.90	112,871	125,650	157,096		75
Totals for	Regency	5,225.44	215,030	239,421	279,104	Sigi Biromaru	177

Note (a) the population of the new Sigi Kota District in 2010 and 2020 is included in the figures for Sigi Biromaru (8 desa), Dolo (2 desa) and Palolo (1 desa) Districts, from parts of which it was created on 14 September 2020.
