= Lindu =

Lindu may refer to:

- Lindu people, an ethnic group from Indonesia
- Lindu language, a language spoken in Indonesia
- Yichun, Heilongjiang, a city in China nicknamed Lindu (meaning "forest city")
