= TVW (disambiguation) =

TVW may refer to:

== Television ==
- TVW, an Australian television channel
- TVW (Washington), an American television channel in Washington state
- TVW (WISC-TV), an American television channel in Wisconsin
- KTVW-DT, an American television channel in Arizona
- WTVW, an American television station in Indiana

== Other uses ==
- TeamViewer
- Sedoa language
