= KLW =

KLW or klw can refer to:

- Kaliwedi railway station, West Java, Indonesia - see List of railway stations in Indonesia#West Java (station code: KLW)
- Klawock Airport, Alaska (IATA airport code: KLW)
- Knoxville Locomotive Works, a United States railway locomotive manufacturer
- Kulpi railway station, West Bengal, India (Indian railways station code: KLW)
- Lindu language, an Austronesian language spoken in Indonesia (ISO-639-3 code: klw)
