= Ilex celebensis =

Conservation status
- Least Concern (IUCN 3.1)

Scientific classification
- Kingdom: Plantae
- Clade: Tracheophytes
- Clade: Angiosperms
- Clade: Eudicots
- Clade: Asterids
- Order: Aquifoliales
- Family: Aquifoliaceae
- Genus: Ilex
- Species: I. celebensis

Binomial name
- Ilex celebensis Capit.

Species of tree in the holly family

Ilex celebensis is a tree in the family Aquifoliaceae, native to maritime Southeast Asia. It is named for the Indonesian island of Celebes (now Sulawesi).

== Description ==
Ilex celebensis grows up to 18 metres (60 ft) tall. Its smooth bark is greenish. The papery leaves are lanceolate or elliptic and measure up to 9.2 cm (4 in) long. The inflorescences, in cymes, feature white flowers. The roundish fruits are brown to red.

== Distribution and habitat ==
Ilex celebensis is native to Sumatra, Borneo, the Lesser Sunda Islands, Sulawesi, the Maluku Islands and New Guinea. It is found in lower montane forests, at elevations of around 1,500 m (5,000 ft). In Borneo, it is present in Mount Kinabalu National Park. In Sulawesi, it is present in Lore Lindu National Park.

== Varieties ==
Two varieties of Ilex celebensis are recognised:

- Ilex celebensis var. celebensis – Sulawesi, Lesser Sunda Islands, Maluku Islands
- Ilex celebensis var. ranauana S.Andrews – Sumatra, Borneo
