= Pokekea Megalithic Site =

Archaeological site in Indonesia

- Situs Megalitik Pokekea
- Pokekea Megalithic Site in Sulawesi Pokekea Megalithic Site in Indonesia
- 1°41′30″S 120°12′48″E
- Type: Monument
- Periods: Iron Age
- Location: Poso Regency, Sulawesi, Indonesia
- Region: Southeast Asia

Site notes
- Material: stone

The Pokekea Megalithic Site is a megalithic archaeological site in the Lore Lindu National Park in Indonesia. It is located in the Behoa (Besoa) Valley northwest of Bada Valley. It is notable for its preserved kalambas, megaliths shaped like large cylindrical stone vats. The kalambas served as communal funerary urns and resemble in form and function the monuments on the Plain of Jars in Laos.

== Features ==
There are 27 kalambas at Pokekea, as well as decorated stone lids and statues (Indonesian: arcas). A kalamba at the park entrance is decorated by faces arranged in a strip along its outer wall. Their features are similar to the arcas in the Bada Valley.

The lids next to the kalambas are also decorated, some with small protruding carvings of monkeys and lizards around their edge. Excavations at the site carried out in 2008 by Dwi Yuniawati have shown that kalambas served as family burial chambers containing a minimum of ten people. The kalambas probably did not house the remains of the entire tribe, but were reserved for the elite. The remains show traces of tooth mutilation and cremation.

== Dating ==
Analysis of two kalambas at Pokekea carried out in 2006 by Wiebke Kirleis, Valério Pillar and Hermann Behling suggest a date range between 766–898 and 1146–1272 AD.
