= Topoiyo language =

Austronesian language spoken in Sulawesi, Indonesia

Topoiyo
- Native to: Indonesia
- Region: Sulawesi
- Native speakers: 450 (2011)
- Language family: Austronesian: Malayo-Polynesian; Celebic; Kaili–Pamona; Northern; Topoiyo

Language codes
- ISO 639-3: toy
- Glottolog: topo1243

The Topoiyo language is an Austronesian language of West Sulawesi, Indonesia spoken by people in Tabolang Village, Topoyo District, Central Mamuju Regency, West Sulawesi. Usually, Topoiyo speakers also speak Mamuju and Indonesian. Topoiyo is also spoken in other villages in Topoyo District, such as Salulebo, Topoyo, and Salupangkang villages.
