= Seko Tengah language =

Austronesian language spoken in Sulawesi, Indonesia

Seko Tengah
- Native to: Indonesia
- Region: Sulawesi
- Native speakers: (2,500 cited 1987)
- Language family: Austronesian: Malayo-Polynesian; South Sulawesi; Seko; Seko Tengah

Language codes
- ISO 639-3: sko
- Glottolog: seko1242

Seko Tengah is an Austronesian language spoken in the North Luwu Regency of South Sulawesi, Indonesia. Together with Seko Padang, Panasuan and Budong-Budong, it belongs to the Seko branch of the South Sulawesi subgroup.
