= Nokilalaki Mountain =

Mountain in Indonesia

- Location within Sulawesi Location within Indonesia

Highest point
- Elevation: 2,357 m (7,733 ft)
- Coordinates: 1°15′18.4″S 120°9′56.5″E

Geography
- Location: Palolo, Sigi Regency, Central Sulawesi, Indonesia

Nokilalaki Mountain is a mountain located in Palolo, Sigi Regency, Central Sulawesi, Indonesia. It has an elevation of 2,357 meters (7,733 ft).
