= Seko Padang language =

Austronesian language spoken in Sulawesi, Indonesia

Seko Padang
- Native to: Indonesia
- Region: Sulawesi
- Native speakers: (5,000 cited 1985)
- Language family: Austronesian: Malayo-Polynesian; South Sulawesi; Seko; Seko Padang

Language codes
- ISO 639-3: skx
- Glottolog: seko1243

Seko Padang is an Austronesian language spoken in the North Luwu Regency of South Sulawesi, Indonesia. Together with Seko Tengah, Panasuan and Budong-Budong, it belongs to the Seko branch of the South Sulawesi subgroup.
