= Kaili–Pamona languages =

Subgroup of the Austronesian language family

Kaili–Pamona
- Geographic distribution: Sulawesi
- Linguistic classification: Austronesian: Malayo-Polynesian; Celebic; Kaili–Pamona
- Subdivisions: Northern (Kaili–Pamona proper); Southern (Uma–Badaic)

Language codes
- Glottolog: nort2898 Northern Kaili-Wolio bada1260 Badaic
- Map of languages on the island of Sulawesi, Kaili-Pamona languages is colored in dark blue along with other Celebic languages.

The Kaili–Pamona languages are a branch of the Celebic subgroup in the Austronesian language family spoken in western Central Sulawesi province, Indonesia.

== Languages ==
Per the 23rd edition of Ethnologue, languages classed under the Kaili–Pamona languages grouping include the following:

- Northern
  - Kaili: Kaili (Ledo Kaili, Da'a Kaili, Unde Kaili, Baras), Lindu, Moma (Kulawi), Topoiyo, Sedoa
  - Pamona: Pamona (Bare’e), Tombelala
- Southern
  - Rampi
  - Uma
  - Sarudu
  - Badaic: Bada, Behoa (Besoa), Napu

Zobel (2020) lists the Kaili–Pamona languages, which he calls Northern Kaili–Wolio, as Common Kaili, Sedoa, Kulawi, Lindu, Topoiyo, Uma, and Pamona. The Badaic languages (Bada, Besoa, and Napu) are excluded and reclassified with the Seko languages as part of the South Sulawesi branch, while Rampi is excluded as a separate branch coordinate to South Sulawesi and Celebic.
