= Bada Valley =

Megalith site in Indonesia

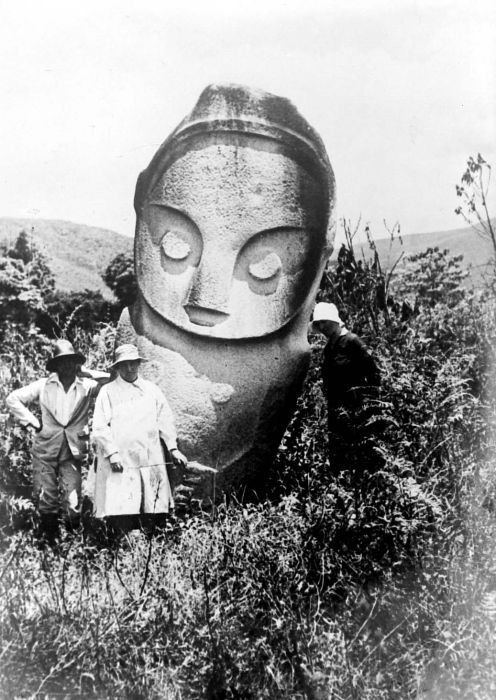
Two Dutch ladies standing by a statue in the Bada Valley in the 1930s

The Bada Valley and Napu Valley, located in the Lore Lindu National Park in Central Sulawesi, Indonesia, contains hundreds of megaliths of undetermined age that are called watu ("stone") in the local Badaic languages and arca ("statue") in Indonesian. The purpose of the megaliths and their builders are unknown.

== Main megaliths ==
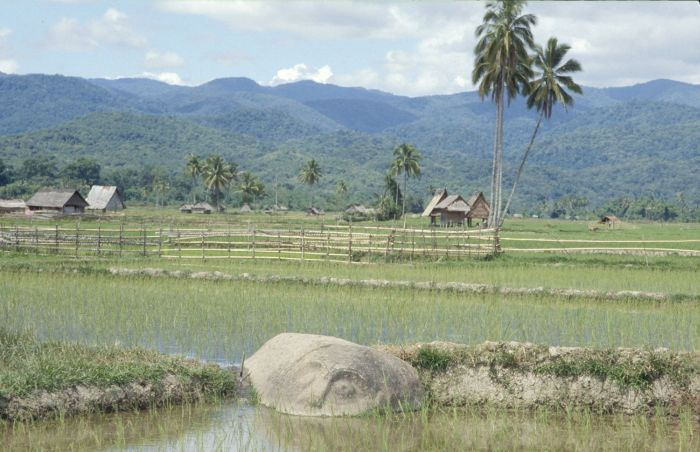
Megalithic Baula statue in the Bada Valley

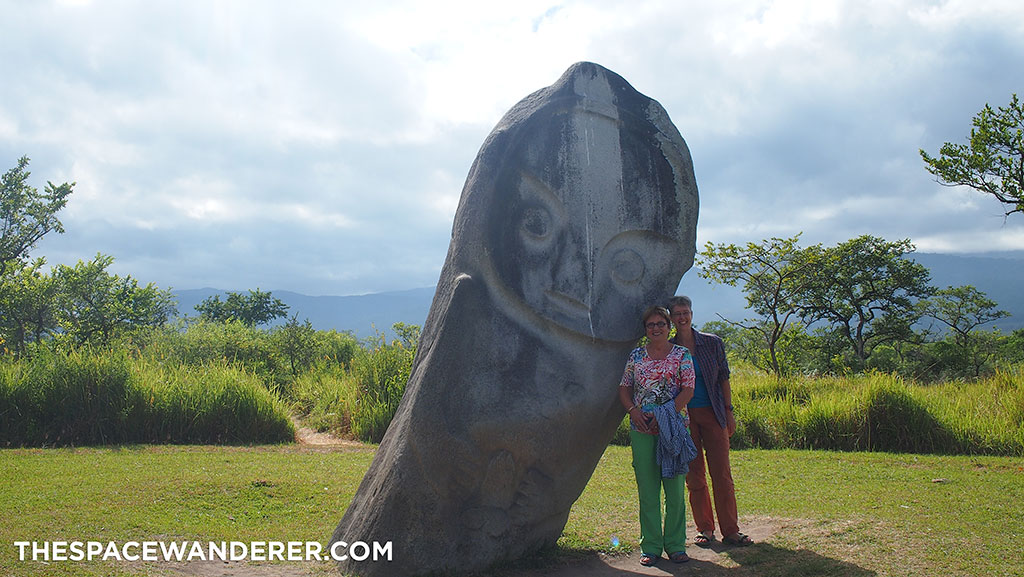
Two tourists next to the Palindo megalith in 2015.

Local Name	Translation	Size	Comments	Location
Palindo	Entertainer	4.5m		1°51′34.54″S 120°15′17.79″E
Mesinga	Wearing a Scarf			
Maturu	Sleeping	3.5m		
Oba	Monkey			1°52′6.99″S 120°13′53.26″E
Naime				
Baula	Buffalo			
Torumpana				
Ari Ipohi				1°52′38.73″S 120°15′20.23″E
Loga	Relieved Heart			1°51′49.50″S 120°16′46.68″E
Langke Bulawa	Golden Bracelet	1.8m		1°51′11.23″S 120°17′29.50″E

== History ==
These ancient statues are said to have existed since the 14th century.

However, in the notes of Albert Christian Kruyt, the Dutch missionary and anthropologist residing in Poso, it is mentioned that before the arrival of the Dutch in Lore in 1908, it was still common for people to make stone tombs. There were still places where Kalamba (stone jars used for burial) were made. Thus, the creation of these objects comes from various periods, with some being as recent as a few hundred years ago or young megaliths.

== Geography ==
The Bada Valley is situated in a relatively flat area surrounded by hills, which creates dramatic scenery with clouds often trapped at the hilltops around the valley. It is common to see one part of the Bada Valley experiencing rain while another part is bathed in sunlight peeking through the clouds.

In the middle of the Bada Valley, the Lariang River flows, merging with the Malei River, making the flow of the Lariang River stronger. For this reason, the Lariang River was once used for river rafting. In the center of the Bada Valley, the current of the Lariang River is quite calm due to the relatively flat terrain.

== Local folklore ==
Palindo, Torompana, Tarae Roe, and Loga are some of the names given by locals to the ancient statues in the Bada Valley. Each statue has a unique story, one of which is Palindo. The local community once believed that Palindo stood upright.

In Lore Lindu National Park, the traditional customs of the Lore tribe are still strong. Besides the stone statues and green rice fields, visitors will also find traditional Lore houses lined up. These wooden houses with ijuk (sugar palm fiber) roofs and bamboo walls are often used as lodging for visitors.

Elders in Sepe Village believe that the Palindo statue, which means "the entertainer" in the local language, represents their ancestors, the Tosaloge tribe. According to legend, the King of Luwuk ordered 1800 statues from Sepe to Palopo to mark his reign over Bada. These statues were supposed to face south, but the mission failed because the Bada people placed them facing west. When the king requested to change their position, the statues fell on the king's troops, killing around 200 people. The Bada people in the past offered sacrifices to these statues before undertaking major tasks, such as opening new farmland.

== Megalithic statues ==
=== Characteristics ===
The megalithic statues in the Bada Valley represent human faces that have been stylized, where the eyebrows and nose are depicted as one, while the mouth is omitted. The statues in the Bada Valley generally have clear gender markers. On the Palindo and Meturu statues, male genitalia are carved. On the Langke Bulawa statue, female genitalia are depicted. Gender differences are also depicted in facial features, where the female statues have faces with a fringe covering the forehead.

Other human statues are about 1.5 meters tall with a diameter of about 50 cm. Besides adult human statues, there is the Oba statue, which is 70 cm tall with a humorous face and unclear gender markers. Locals refer to it as a monkey figure, but it can also be interpreted as representing children.

=== Kalamba ===
Kalamba are artifacts in the form of large jars with lids, 1.5-2 meters in diameter, used for burial, found in the Bada Valley. These Kalamba are often found with a stone cover. Around Kalamba, smaller stones are often found. It is suspected that these smaller stones served as small Kalamba for the remains of babies or children. Additionally, circular stones resembling small tables or stone mortars are also found around Kalamba.

The human statues and Kalamba are suspected to have been created by the same culture. This is based on the presence of small Kalamba and mortar-like stones often found near the human statues.

== See also ==
- Culture of Indonesia
- History of Indonesia
- Prehistoric Indonesia

== Sources ==
- Tarling, Nicholas, The Cambridge history of Southeast Asia: From early times to c.1500, p. 134, Cambridge University Press, 1992, ISBN 0-521-35505-2 and ISBN 0-521-35506-0
