= Yaron Brook =

Israeli-American Objectivist

- ירון ברוק
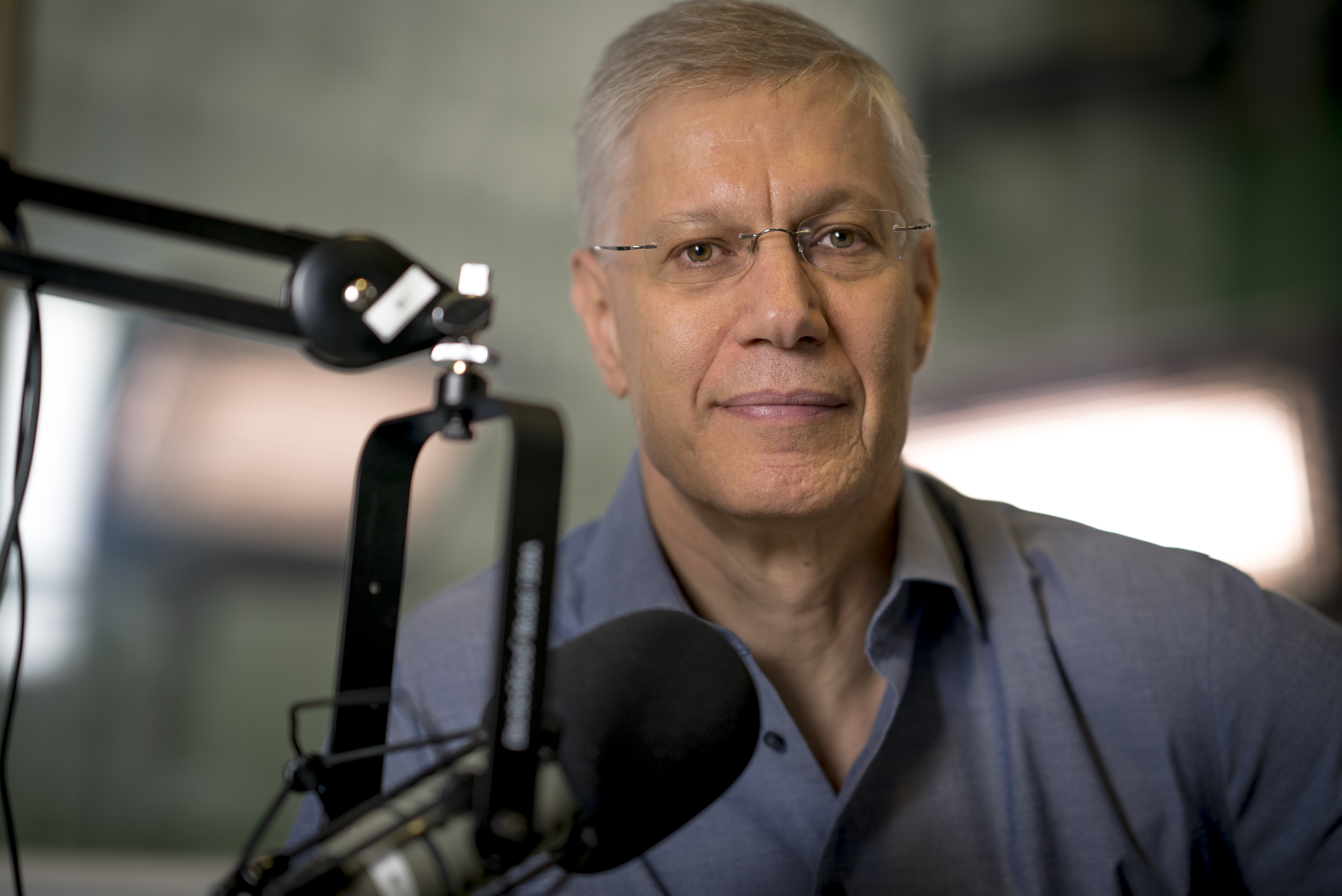
- Born: May 23, 1961 (age 65); Jerusalem, Israel
- Citizenship: American, Israeli
- Education: Technion (BS); UT Austin (MBA, PhD)
- Occupations: Podcaster, The Yaron BrookShow Author, Speaker, Capitalism, Free Markets, Individual Rights Chairman of the Board, Ayn Rand Institute
- Children: 2
- Writing career
- Subjects: Capitalism, Free Markets, Inequallity
- Notable works: In Pursuit of Wealth; Equal Is Unfair; Free Market Revolution; Why Businessmen Need Philosophy; Neoconservatism; Winning the Unwinnable War
- Movement: Objectivism
- Website: yaronbrookshow.com

Yaron Brook (Hebrew: ירון ברוק; born May 23, 1961) is an American writer, commentator, podcast host, and former finance professor who is chairman of the board of the Ayn Rand Institute (ARI). Brook served as president and executive director of ARI from 2000 to 2017. He is the host of The Yaron Brook Show, a podcast program covering news, culture, politics, and philosophy from an Objectivist perspective. An advocate of Ayn Rand's philosophy of Objectivism and laissez-faire capitalism, he has written and spoken on political philosophy, economics, finance, and foreign policy. With Don Watkins, he co-authored Free Market Revolution (2012), Equal Is Unfair (2016), and In Pursuit of Wealth (2017).

== Biography ==
Yaron Brook was born in Jerusalem and raised in Haifa. His parents were Jewish socialists from South Africa. He became interested in Objectivism at age 16 after reading Ayn Rand's novel Atlas Shrugged.

After graduating from high school, he served as a first sergeant in Israeli military intelligence (1979–1982) and then earned a Bachelor of Science in civil engineering in 1986 from the Technion – Israel Institute of Technology in Haifa.

In 1987, he moved to the United States in 1987 to attend the University of Texas at Austin where he earned an MBA in 1989 and a PhD in finance in 1994.

== Career ==
Brook became an associate of leading Objectivist intellectuals, such as philosopher Leonard Peikoff.

In 1994, he co-founded Lyceum International, a company that organized Objectivist conferences and offered distance-learning courses.

=== Finance and academia ===
Brook was an assistant professor of finance at Santa Clara University from 1993 to 2000. His academic research addressed corporate governance, banking, dividends, and the effects of changes in directors’ liability. His articles appeared in publications including the Journal of Financial and Quantitative Analysis, The Journal of Finance, Financial Management, and the Journal of Corporate Finance.

In 1998, Brook co-founded BH Equity Research, a private equity and hedge fund manager.

=== Ayn Rand Institute ===
In 2000, Brook left Santa Clara University to become president and executive director of the Ayn Rand Institute, succeeding Michael Berliner. During his tenure, ARI expanded its educational, public-policy, and media activities. In 2002, the institute moved its headquarters from Marina del Rey to Irvine, California. [5]

Brook served as ARI's president and executive director until 2017 and subsequently continued as chairman of its board. He represents the institute in lectures, debates, interviews, and public forums in the United States and internationally.

=== The Yaron Brook Show ===
Brook launched The Yaron Brook Show as an audio podcast on January 7, 2015; the program expanded to a YouTube fixture in May 2017. The program features Brook's commentary on current events, politics, economics, culture, and philosophy, presented from the perspective of Objectivism. Episodes are distributed on YouTube and podcast services including Apple Podcasts, Spotify, and Spreaker.

For a time, The Yaron Brook Show aired under the Radical Capitalist and Living Objectively on The Blaze Radio and on Chicago's AM 560 WIND (AM 560 The Answer) radio station from 2015 - 2018.

=== Books and commentary ===
Brook and Don Watkins published Free Market Revolution: How Ayn Rand's Ideas Can End Big Government in 2012. The book presents a moral and political defense of laissez-faire capitalism based on Rand's philosophy. They subsequently wrote Equal Is Unfair: America's Misguided Fight Against Income Inequality (2016), which argues that public policy should emphasize individual liberty and opportunity rather than equality of economic outcomes, and In Pursuit of Wealth: The Moral Case for Finance (2017), a defense of the economic and moral role of finance.

Brook has also appeared on television, radio, podcasts, and public debate programs.

== Views and opinions ==
=== Objectivism ===
Brook advocates Objectivism, Rand's philosophical system, and argues that capitalism requires a moral defense grounded in reason, rational self-interest, individual rights, and the pursuit of personal happiness. He rejects the view that capitalism should be defended only for its economic efficiency. He has characterized Objectivism as distinct from both political conservatism and progressivism, particularly on religion, economic regulation, and the role of government.

=== Politics and economics ===
Brook is an outspoken proponent of laissez-faire capitalism. In appearances on CNBC and several articles and speeches, he has defended and upheld what he views as the rights of companies and businessmen and the virtues of capitalism. In a January 7, 2007, editorial in USA Today, he defended multimillion-dollar CEO pay packages against the attempt by the government to regulate them. In a 2010 interview, Brook called the efforts of Democrats to raise taxes on multi-millionaires "totally immoral." He criticized George W. Bush for signing the Sarbanes-Oxley Act, which regulates corporate accounting practices.

Brook has also argued that antitrust laws are "unjust and make no sense ethically or economically." Along with antitrust law, Brook opposes extensive business regulation, and redistributive taxation. In a 2000 online discussion hosted by The Washington Post, he argued that business ethics should be based on the voluntary pursuit of value rather than sacrifice or government direction.

Brook and his co-author Don Watkins argue that differences in income are not inherently unjust and that government efforts to equalize outcomes can restrict economic freedom and impede upward mobility in their book Equal is Unfair: America's Misguided Fight Against Income Inequality (2016). Brook and Watkins assert “What we care about is whether individuals are able to rise by merit—and the fact is that many of the policies the inequality critics say will improve mobility actually make rising by merit much harder.”

Brook continues his fight for capitalism with Watkins in his book In Pursuit of Wealth: The Moral Case for Finance (2017), they defend financial institutions and profit-seeking as essential to investment, innovation, and economic growth.

=== Foreign Policy ===
Brook argues that the proper purpose of foreign policy is the defense of the lives and rights of a country's citizens. He has criticized Western responses to terrorism as insufficiently focused on defeating the states and ideological movements that support it. He uses the term “Islamic totalitarianism” to distinguish the political ideology he opposes from terrorism as a tactic.

=== Israel ===
Brook supports Israel's right to defend itself while criticizing religious and collectivist rationales for Zionism. He has opposed both the confiscation of Arab-owned property for Jewish settlement and religious claims to territory. At the same time, he has argued that Israel should take stronger military action against organizations such as Hamas and should place the protection of its citizens above international approval.

On Zionism, Brook argued that "Zionism fused a valid concern—self-preservation amid a storm of hostility—with a toxic premise: ethnically based collectivism and religion."

=== Islam ===
In 2018, a public event featuring Brook and Carl Benjamin, a controversial YouTuber known as "Sargon of Akkad", as speakers was protested by masked activists. Brook has claimed that "Islamic ideology" is not compatible with the moral values of the contemporary Western world.

=== Personal life ===
Yaron is married and has two sons.

== Published works ==
=== Books ===
- Brook, Yaron; Watkins, Don (September 21, 2017). In Pursuit of Wealth: The Moral Case for Finance. Ayn Rand Institute. ISBN 978-0996010115.
- Watkins, Don; Brook, Yaron (March 29, 2016). Equal Is Unfair: America's Misguided Fight Against Income Inequality. St. Martin's Press. ISBN 978-1250084446.
- Brook, Yaron; Watkins, Don (September 18, 2012). Free Market Revolution: How Ayn Rand's Ideas Can End Big Government. St. Martin's Press. ISBN 978-0230341692.
- Thompson, C. Bradley; Brook, Yaron (May 30, 2010). Neoconservatism: An Obituary for an Idea. Routledge. ISBN 978-1594518317.

=== Other ===
- Corporate governance: a study of director liability, firm performance and shareholder wealth, University of Texas, Austin, 1994 [thesis]
- Shareholder wealth effects of directors' liability limitation provisions, Brook, Yaron; Rao, Ramesh K. S., Journal of Financial & Quantitative Analysis, vol. 3, 1994, 481–497
- Terrorism in Israel, Yaron Brook, The Intellectual Activist, Vol. 10, No. 4, July 1996
- The gains from takeover deregulation: Evidence from the end of interstate banking restrictions, Brook, Yaron; Hendershott, Robert; Darrell Lee, Journal of Finance the journal of the American Finance Association, {Malden, Mass. et al.: Blackwell}, vol. 6, 1998, 2185–2204
- Brook, Yaron; Charlton, William T. Jr.; Hendershott, Robert J. "Do Firms Use Dividends to Signal Large Future Cash Flow Increases?". Financial Management. 27 (3): 46–57. Archived from the original on December 18, 2007 – via FindArticles.
- Corporate Governance and Recent Consolidation in the Banking Industry, Brook, Yaron; Hendershott, Robert J.; Lee, Darrell, Journal of Corporate Finance: contracting, governance and organization, (Santa Clara U; Kennesaw State U), vol. 2, 2000, pp. 141–164
- Hype and Internet Stocks, Brook, Yaron; Hendershott, Robert J., The Journal of Investing, vol. 2, 53–64
- Just War Theory vs. American Self-Defense, Yaron Brook, Alex Epstein, The Objective Standard, Vol. 1, No. 1, Spring 2006
- The Forward Strategy For Failure, Yaron Brook, Elan Journo, The Objective Standard, Vol. 2, No. 1, Spring 2007
- Brook's article on CEO compensation in USA Today
- Opposing View: Government Tries to Do Too Much, coauthored with Don Watkins, USAToday.com,1/26/14
- Obamacare Creates a New Class of Free Riders, coauthored with Rituparna Basu, The Daily Caller, 1/23/14
- "You Didn't Build That," Conservative Style, coauthored with Steve Simpson, The Daily Caller, 12/9/13
- Ayn Rand rewrote the story of capitalism to show that it is a necessary good, coauthored with Don Watkins, London School of Economics, 10/2013
- To Be Born Poor Doesn't Mean You'll Always Be Poor, coauthored with Don Watkins, Forbes.com, 4/12/13
- Capitalism In No Way Created Poverty, It Inherited It, coauthored with Don Watkins, Forbes.com, 02/25/2013
- 3 Crucial Lessons Ayn Rand Can Teach Us Today, coauthored with Don Watkins, FoxNews.com, 02/02/2013
- Ayn Rand and the Fight to Limit Government, coauthored with Don Watkins, Foxnews.com, 1/29/13
- Why the Glass, Steagall Myth Persists, coauthored with Don Watkins, Forbes.com, 11/12/2012
- President Obama Duels With Ayn Rand Over What Makes America Great, coauthored with Don Watkins, Forbes.com, 10/29/2012
- The nature of freedom, Trud Daily (Bulgaria), 10/19/2012
- Why Ayn Rand's Absence From Last Thursday's Debate Benefits Big Government, coauthored with Don Watkins, Forbes.com, 10/15/2012
- Opposing View: Celebrate Private Equity, USA Today, 05/2012
- The ‘On Your Own’ Economy, coauthored with Don Watkins, Forbes.com, 02/201
