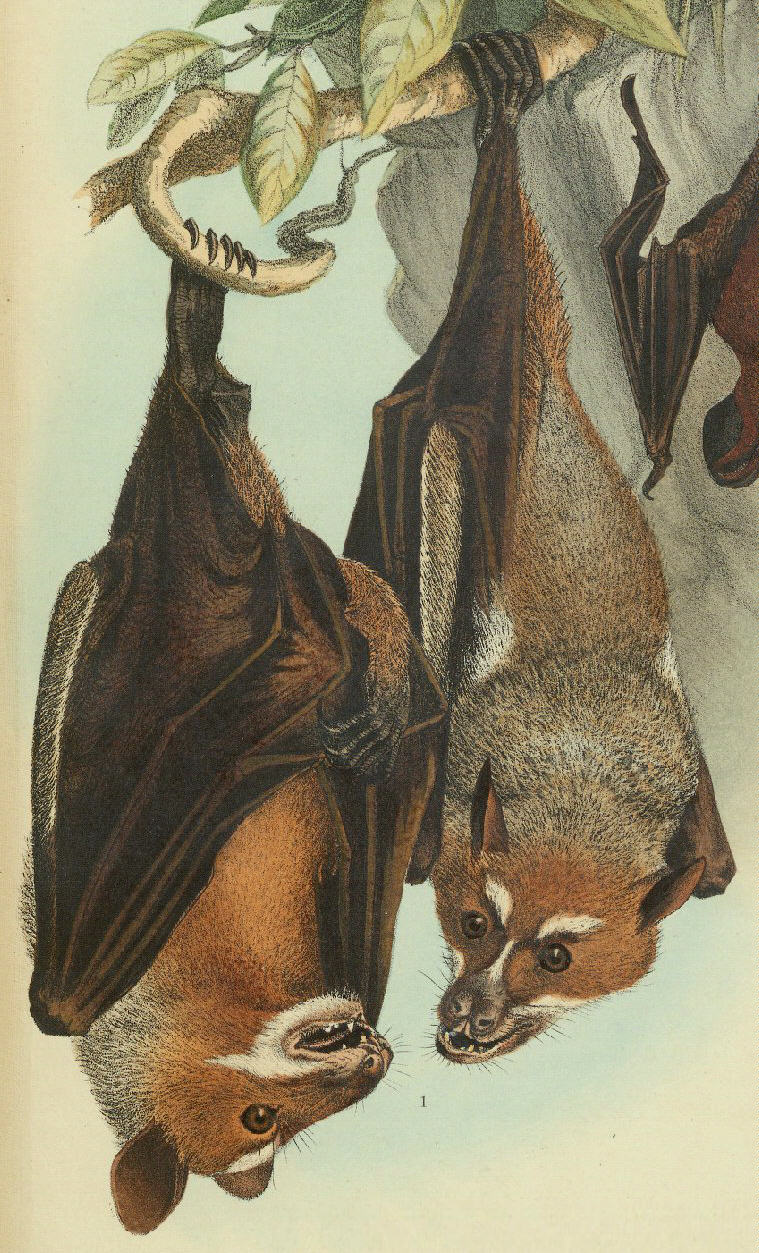

Scientific classification
- Kingdom: Animalia
- Phylum: Chordata
- Class: Mammalia
- Order: Chiroptera
- Family: Pteropodidae
- Genus: Styloctenium; Matschie, 1899

Type species
- Pteropus wallacei Gray, 1866

Species
- Styloctenium mindorensis Styloctenium wallacei

= Styloctenium =

Genus of bats

Styloctenium (known as stripe-faced fruit bat or stripe-faced flying fox) is a genus of stripe-faced fruit bat in the Pteropodidae (megabat) family. It comprises the following species:

- Mindoro stripe-faced fruit bat, Styloctenium mindorensis
- Sulawesi stripe-faced fruit bat, Styloctenium wallacei

== Bibliography ==
- "Styloctenium". Integrated Taxonomic Information System.
- Esselstyn, J. A. 2007. "A new species of stripe-faced fruit bat (Chiroptera: Pteropodidae: Styloctenium) from the Philippines." Journal of Mammalogy, 88:951-958
