= Moma language =

Austronesian language spoken in Sulawesi, Indonesia

Moma
- Kulawi
- Native to: Indonesia
- Region: Sulawesi
- Ethnicity: Kulawi
- Native speakers: (5,500 cited 2000)
- Language family: Austronesian: Malayo-Polynesian; Celebic; Kaili–Pamona; Northern; Kaili; Moma

Language codes
- ISO 639-3: myl
- Glottolog: moma1242

Moma (also Kulawi) is an Austronesian language spoken in Central Sulawesi, Indonesia. Historically, it is derived from the Kaili dialect cluster, but is divergent due to strong influence from Uma.

== Phonology ==
The sound inventory of Moma below had been described by Adriani and Esser (1939).

Consonants
			Labial	Alveolar	Palatal	Velar	Glottal
Nasal			m	n	ɲ	ŋ	
Plosive	plain	voiceless	p	t		k	ʔ
Plosive	plain	voiced	b	d	ɟ	g	
Plosive	prenasalized	voiceless	ᵐp	ⁿt	ᶮc	ᵑk	
Plosive	prenasalized	voiced	ᵐb	ⁿd			
Fricative			β				h
Trill				r			
Approximant				l	j		

Vowels
	Front	Back
Close	i	u
Close-Mid	e	o
Open	a	

Like many other languages on Sulawesi, Moma has only open syllables.

== Grammar ==
Moma has the following pronoun sets:

Moma personal pronouns
	Independent	Enclitic	Prefixed	Suffixed
First-person singular	aku	-a	ku-	-ku
Second-person singular	iko	-ko	nu-	-mu
Third-person singular	hia	-i	na-	-na
First-person plural (inclusive)	kita	-ta	ta-	-ta
First-person plural (exclusive)	kami	-kami	ki-	-kami
Second-person plural	komi	-komi	ni-	-mi
Third-person plural	hira	-ra	ra-	-ra
