= Sarudu language =

Austronesian language spoken in Sulawesi, Indonesia

Sarudu
- Native to: Indonesia
- Region: Sulawesi
- Native speakers: (4,000 cited 1987)
- Language family: Austronesian: Malayo-Polynesian; Celebic; Kaili–Pamona; Southern; Sarudu

Language codes
- ISO 639-3: sdu
- Glottolog: saru1242

Sarudu is an Austronesian language of West Sulawesi, Indonesia. It is closely related to (and reportedly mutually intelligible with) Uma.
