= Rampi people =

To Rampi
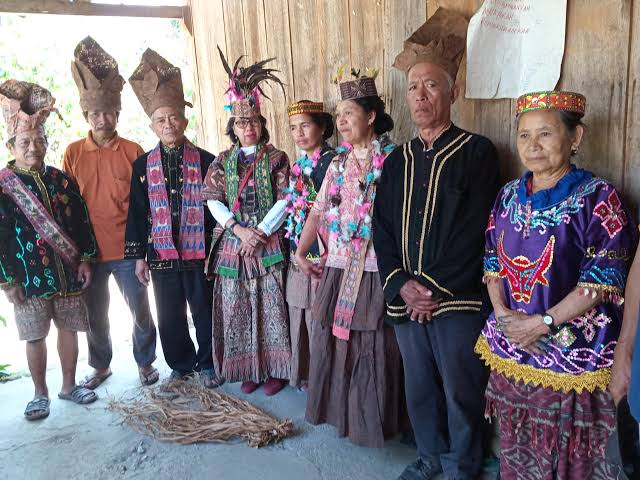
- Rampi people in traditional costume

Total population
- ±8,000

Regions with significant populations
- Indonesia (North Luwu Regency, South Sulawesi, Sulawesi)

Languages
- Rampi

Religion
- Protestant Christianity

Related ethnic groups
- Bugis, Pamona, Seko

The Rampi people (Rampi: To Rampi; Indonesian: Orang Rampi) are an Austronesian ethnic group that inhabit the mountainous area of Rampi District, North Luwu Regency, South Sulawesi, Sulawesi, Indonesia. The region inhabited by the Rampi is an isolated and mountainous one, namely the North Luwu Mountains, in the northern part of South Sulawesi.

== Language ==
The mother tongue of the Rampi people is the Rampi language, an endangered language from the Kaili–Pamona branch of the Celebic subgroup in the Austronesian family. Rampi is spoken by around 8,000 people in Rampi, North Luwu, and is also known as Ha'uwa, Leboni, or Rampi-Leboni.

== Culture ==
=== Hunting tradition ===
The Rampi people have a tradition of hunting anoa (dwarf buffalo), which is one of the main food sources for people who live in the central mountains of Sulawesi.

=== Society ===
Rampi people maintain strong kinship ties between villages and neighbors, and use Rampi surnames, which is one of their distinguishing characteristics among other ethnic groups of Indonesia. Economically, the main livelihood of the Rampi is farming.

=== Customary law ===
The Rampi still firmly uphold the role of customary institutions led by the Tokei Tongko Rampi in resolving various social issues. They enforce customary rules related to social life, such as the penalty for adultery, which is the slaughtering of three buffaloes, which are then eaten together. This is followed by powahe lori (a purification ritual), which involves slaughtering one of the three buffaloes and then eating together. This is then followed by the "washing away of shame" or "cleansing the soil," followed by the pehilu or garing ritual, which serves as a "binding of the hands" intended to deter the perpetrator from repeating the offense. Another customary violation, peruhe or pebamba involves stealing someone's spouse, which results in a fine of one buffalo.

=== Traditional feast ===
The Rampi hold a traditional sacred festival called magambo once per year. They perform various traditional arts and dances, including preparing eight buffaloes for slaughter.

=== Traditional clothing ===
Rampi traditional dress is made from banyan tree bark (sampollo), and the process of making it takes about three months. This traditional dress was worn by a Rampi participant, Dewi Anggraeni, at the Puteri Indonesia beauty pageant auditions in 2015.

== See also ==
- Rampi language
- North Luwu Regency
