= Lindu people =

Ethnic group from Indonesia

To Lindu
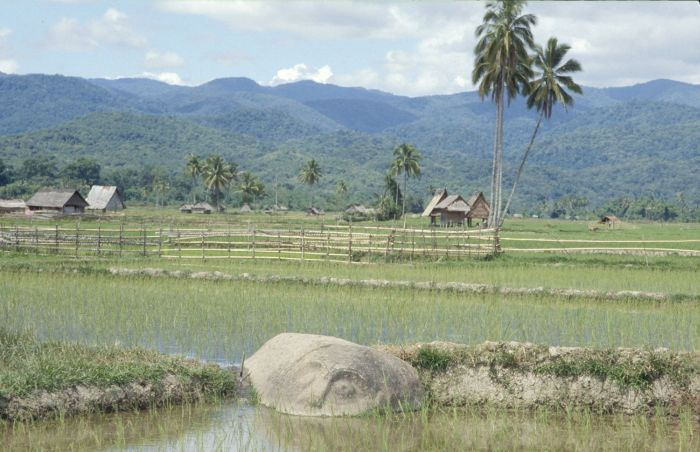
- A village and a megalith in a paddy field at the Lore Lindu National Park, Central Sulawesi, Indonesia.

Total population
- 2,870

Regions with significant populations
- Indonesia (Central Sulawesi)

Languages
- Lindu, Indonesian

Religion
- Christianity (predominantly), Folk religion

Related ethnic groups
- Lore • Pamona • Kaili • Kulawi

The Lindu people (Tado: To Lindu) are an ethnic group divided into four indigenous communities known as Anca, Tomado, Langko, and Puroo in areas around Lindu Lake in Central Sulawesi, Indonesia. They belonged to the Kaili-Tomini people cluster of Sulawesi.
