= Mbelala language =

Austronesian language spoken in Sulawesi, Indonesia

Mbelala
- Tombelala
- Native to: Indonesia
- Region: Sulawesi
- Native speakers: (1,100 cited 1991)
- Language family: Austronesian: Malayo-Polynesian; Celebic; Kaili–Pamona; Northern; Mbelala

Language codes
- ISO 639-3: ttp
- Glottolog: tomb1245
- ELP: Tombelala

Mbelala (Belala), or Tombelala, is an Austronesian language of Central Sulawesi, Indonesia.
