= Panasuan language =

Austronesian language spoken in Indonesia

Panasuan
- To Panasean
- Native to: Indonesia
- Region: West Sulawesi
- Native speakers: 800 (2004)
- Language family: Austronesian: Malayo-Polynesian; South Sulawesi; Seko; Panasuan

Language codes
- ISO 639-3: psn
- Glottolog: pana1303
- ELP: Panasuan

Panasuan is an Austronesian language spoken in the border area of West Sulawesi and South Sulawesi provinces, Indonesia. Together with Seko Padang, Seko Tengah and Budong-Budong, it belongs to the Seko branch of the South Sulawesi subgroup.
