= Budong-Budong language =

Austronesian language spoken in Sulawesi, Indonesia

Budong-Budong
- Tongkou
- Native to: Indonesia
- Region: West Sulawesi
- Native speakers: 180 (2010)
- Language family: Austronesian: Malayo-Polynesian; South Sulawesi; Seko; Budong-Budong

Language codes
- ISO 639-3: bdx
- Glottolog: budo1241
- ELP: Budong-Budong

Budong-Budong is an Austronesian language of Sulawesi, Indonesia, spoken in the village of Tongkou, Budong-Budong District, Central Mamuju Regency. Together with Seko Padang, Seko Tengah and Panasuan, it belongs to the Seko branch of the South Sulawesi subgroup.
