= CBOE DJIA BuyWrite Index =

- Foundation: 2002
- Operator: S&P Dow Jones Indices
- Exchanges: Cboe Global Markets
- Trading symbol: BXD
- Related indices: Dow Jones Industrial Average
- Website: www.cboe.com/micro/bxd/introduction.aspx

The CBOE S&P DJIA BuyWrite Index (ticker symbol BXD) is a benchmark index designed to show the hypothetical performance of a portfolio that engages in a buy-write strategy on the Dow Jones Industrial Average (DJIA).

== Descriptions ==
The term buy-write is used because the investor buys stocks and writes call options against the stock position. The writing of the call option provides extra income for an investor who is willing to forgo some upside potential.

The BXD Index is designed to show the hypothetical performance of a strategy in which an investor buys a portfolio of the 30 stocks in the DJIA, and also sells (or writes) covered call options on the DJIA Index.

== History ==
Investors have used exchange-listed options to engage in buy-write strategies since the 1970s, but prior to 2002 there was no major benchmark for buy-write strategies. In 2000 and 2001, options portfolio managers requested that Cboe Global Markets develop benchmark indexes for buy-write strategies. The CBOE S&P 500 BuyWrite Index (BXM) was introduced in 2002, and the CBOE DJIA BuyWrite Index (BXD) was introduced in 2005.

Investors have used covered call strategies for more than three decades. In 2002, Cboe Global Markets introduced the first major benchmark index for covered call strategies, the CBOE S&P 500 BuyWrite Index (ticker BXM). In 2004, Ibbotson Associates published a case study on buy-write strategies. More than forty new buy-write investment products have been introduced since mid-2004.

== Samples of Buy-write Investment Products Based on the DJIA ==
- Merrill Lynch 8% Monthly Income Strategic Return Notes Linked to the CBOE DJIA BuyWrite Index (ticker symbol BWR).
- Morgan Stanley 8% Targeted Income STARS on CBOE’s BXD Index (ticker symbol DBY).
- Morgan Stanley STARS on the CBOE DJIA BuyWrite Index (BXD) Index (ticker symbol DBZ).
- Dow 30 Premium & Dividend Income Fund Inc. (ticker symbol DPD).

== Published Studies by Consulting Firms on the Buywrite Strategy ==
In 2007 Fund Evaluation Group (FEG) issued a study entitled "Evaluation of BuyWrite and Volatility Indexes—Using the CBOE DJIA BuyWrite Index (BXD) and the CBOE DJIA Volatility Index (VXD) for Asset Allocation and Diversification Purposes." The paper studied the 109-month period from October 1997 to November 2006. The FEG study presented several findings on the 9-year performance of the BXD Index, including:

- Income Generation. Selling index options 12 times per year can produce significant income. Over the 109-month period studied, the average monthly options premium received was 1.84%, or an annualized rate of 24.46%.
- Diversification and Reduced Volatility. The volatility of the BXD was 25% less than that of the DJIA and 46% lower than the Russell 2000. The study found that if an investor had allocated 25% of an otherwise all-stock portfolio to the BXD, the portfolio volatility would have declined by about 9%.
- Improved Risk-Adjusted Returns. Incorporating a 10% allocation to the BXD could have improved the risk-adjusted returns (as measured by the Sharpe ratio) of all four comparative portfolios studied (i.e., all-stocks, all fixed income, aggressive and conservative portfolios).

In 2006 Callan Associates published A Review of the CBOE S&P 500 BuyWrite Index.

In 2004 Ibbotson Associates published a case study on buywrite strategies.

== News Clips ==
- Crawford, Gregory. “Buy Writing Makes Comeback as Way to Hedge Risk.” Pensions & Investments, (May 16, 2005).
- Demby, E. R. “Maintaining Speed -- In a Sideways or Falling Market, Writing Covered Call Options Is One Way To Give Your Clients Some Traction.” Bloomberg Wealth Manager, (February 2005).
- Feldman, Barry and Dhuv Roy. "Passive Options-Based Investment Strategies: The Case of the CBOE S&P 500 BuyWrite Index." The Journal of Investing, (Summer 2005).
- Ferry, John. "An Array of Options - A Buy-write Strategy Can Add Some Octane to Portfolios When the Markets Lack Direction." Worth Magazine, (April 2005), pp. 102 – 104.
- Hadi, Mohammed. "Buy-Write Strategy Could Help in Sideways Market." Wall Street Journal. (April 29, 2006) pg. B5.
- Hill, Joanne, Venkatesh Balasubramanian, Krag (Buzz) Gregory, and Ingrid Tierens. "Finding Alpha via Covered Index Writing." Financial Analysts Journal. (Sept.-Oct. 2006). pp. 29–46.
- Moran, Matt. “BuyWrite's Strategy for Higher Yields and Lower Volatility.” Research Magazine. (2006).
- Roeder, David. "New Funds Try Options to Boost Stock Income." Chicago Sun-Times, (October 10, 2004).
- Schneeweis, Thomas, and Richard Spurgin. "The Benefits of Index Option-Based Strategies for Institutional Portfolios" The Journal of Alternative Investments, (Spring 2001), pp. 44 – 52.
- Smith, Steven. “Options on Covered Calls.” RealMoney, (Dec. 20, 2006).
- Tan, Kopin, "Yield Boost -- Firms Market Covered-call Writing to Up Returns." Barron's, (Oct. 25, 2004).
- Wasik, J. “Used Wisely, Options Can Help Dodge Stock Losses.” Bloomberg News, (May 15, 2005).
- Whaley, Robert. "Risk and Return of the CBOE BuyWrite Monthly Index" The Journal of Derivatives, (Winter 2002), pp. 35 – 42.
- Woolley, S. “Squeeze Your Portfolio Harder,” BusinessWeek, (December 27, 2004).

== External links -- Education and Benchmark Indexes ==
- Characteristics and Risks of Listed Options
- CBOE DJIA BuyWrite Index (BXD)
- Options Toolbox
- Yahoo! Covered Calls
- Covered Calls Worksheet
