= Tado language =

Tado may be:

- Chami language (Colombia)
- Lindu language (Sulawesi, Indonesia)
- Adja language (Benin & Togo)
