= List of districts of West Sulawesi =

The province of West Sulawesi (Sulawesi Barat) in Indonesia is divided into six regencies (kabupaten), which are subdivided in turn administratively into 69 districts (kecamatan).

The districts of West Sulawesi, with the regency each falls into, are as follows:

- Allu, Polewali Mandar
- Anreapi, Polewali Mandar
- Aralle, Mamasa
- Balanipa, Polewali Mandar
- Bambalamotu, Pasangkayu
- Banggae, Majene
- Baras, Pasangkayu
- Binuang, Polewali Mandar
- Bonehau, Mamuju
- Budong-Budong, Mamuju
- Campalagian, Polewali Mandar
- Kalukku, Mamuju
- Kalumpang, Mamuju
- Karossa, Mamuju
- Limboro, Polewali Mandar
- Luyo, Polewali Mandar
- Malunda, Majene
- Mamasa, Mamasa
- Mambi, Mamasa
- Mamuju, Mamuju
- Mapilli, Polewali Mandar
- Matakali, Polewali Mandar
- Matangnga, Polewali Mandar
- Messawa, Mamasa
- Nosu, Mamasa
- Pamboang, Majene
- Pana, Mamasa
- Pangale, Mamuju
- Papalang, Mamuju
- Pasangkayu, Pasangkayu
- Polewali, Polewali Mandar
- Sampaga, Mamuju
- Sarudu, Pasangkayu
- Sendana, Majene
- Sesena Padang, Mamasa
- Simboro dan Kepulauan, Mamuju
- Sumarorong, Mamasa
- Tabang, Mamasa
- Tabulahan, Mamasa
- Tapalang Barat, Mamuju
- Tapalang, Mamuju
- Tapango, Polewali Mandar
- Tinambung, Polewali Mandar
- Tobadak, Mamuju
- Tommo, Mamuju
- Topoyo, Mamuju
- Tutallu, Polewali Mandar
- Wonomulyo, Polewali Mandar
