= Badaic languages =

Subgroup of the Austronesian language family

Badaic
- Geographic distribution: Sulawesi, Indonesia
- Ethnicity: Lore peoples (excl. Sedoa)
- Linguistic classification: Austronesian: Malayo-Polynesian; South Sulawesi; Seko–Badaic; Badaic
- Subdivisions: Bada; Behoa; Napu; Limola

Language codes
- Glottolog: bada1260

The Badaic languages include three closely related Austronesian languages spoken in the North Lore and South Lore districts in Poso Regency, Central Sulawesi, Indonesia, viz. Bada (Bada’), Behoa (Besoa), and Napu, and also Limola, spoken in North Luwu Regency, South Sulawesi. Bada, Besoa, and Napu are 80–91% lexically similar and to a great degree mutually intelligible, but their speakers are culturally distinct.

== Classification ==
The classification of the Badaic languages has been controversial. While traditionally held to be a branch of the Kaili-Pamona languages, they share many features with languages of the Seko branch of the South Sulawesi languages and have been reclassified in recent subgrouping proposals as South Sulawesi languages that were strongly influenced by Kaili-Pamona languages.

Zobel (2020) classifies Badaic with the Seko languages as part of a Seko–Badaic group within the South Sulawesi branch.
