= Behoa language =

Austronesian language spoken in Sulawesi, Indonesia

Behoa
- Besoa
- Native to: Indonesia
- Region: Sulawesi
- Ethnicity: Behoa people
- Native speakers: 10,000 (2007)
- Language family: Austronesian: Malayo-Polynesian; Celebic; Kaili–Pamona; Southern; Badaic; Behoa

Language codes
- ISO 639-3: bep
- Glottolog: beso1237
- ELP: Besoa

Behoa (also Besoa) is an Austronesian language spoken in the North Lore district of Central Sulawesi, Indonesia. Together with Napu and Bada, it belongs to the Badaic subgroup. Based on lexical similarity, Behoa occupies an immediate position within Badaic between Napu and Bada; nevertheless it is geographically, politically and culturally distinct.
