= Lindu language =

Austronesian language spoken in Sulawesi, Indonesia

Lindu
- Tado
- Native to: Indonesia
- Region: Sulawesi
- Ethnicity: Lindu
- Native speakers: (2,400 cited 2000)
- Language family: Austronesian: Malayo-Polynesian; Celebic; Kaili–Pamona; Northern; Kaili; Lindu

Language codes
- ISO 639-3: klw
- Glottolog: lind1248

Lindu or Tado is an Austronesian language of Central Sulawesi, Indonesia spoken by the Lindu people. It is closely related to Moma.
