= Bxd (gene) =

Long non-coding RNA

Bithoraxoid conserved region 1
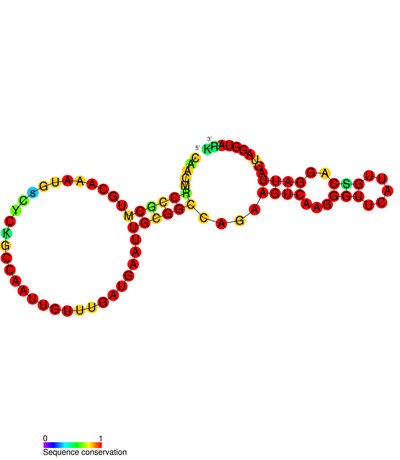
- Conserved secondary structure of Bithoraxoid conserved region 1

Identifiers
- Symbol: bxd_1
- Rfam: RF01929

Other data
- RNA type: Gene
- Domain(s): Drosophila
- PDB structures: PDBe

Bithoraxoid (bxd) is a long non-coding RNA found in Drosophila. It silences the expression of the Ultrabithorax (Ubx) gene by transcriptional interference.
