= Napu language =

Austronesian language spoken in Sulawesi, Indonesia

Napu
- Native to: Indonesia
- Region: Sulawesi
- Ethnicity: Napu people
- Native speakers: (6,100 cited 2000)
- Language family: Austronesian: Malayo-Polynesian; Celebic; Kaili–Pamona; Southern; Badaic; Napu

Language codes
- ISO 639-3: npy
- Glottolog: napu1241
- ELP: Napu

Napu is an Austronesian language spoken in the North Lore district of Central Sulawesi, Indonesia. Together with Bada and Behoa, it belongs to the Badaic subgroup.
