= Uma language =

Austronesian language spoken in Sulawesi, Indonesia

Uma
- Pipikoro
- Native to: Indonesia
- Region: Sulawesi
- Native speakers: (20,000 cited 1990)
- Language family: Austronesian: Malayo-Polynesian; Celebic; Kaili–Pamona; Southern; Uma

Language codes
- ISO 639-3: ppk
- Glottolog: umaa1242

Uma (known natively as Pipikoro) is an Austronesian language spoken in Central and South Sulawesi, Indonesia.

== Phonology ==
=== Consonants ===
Consonant inventory
		Bilabial	Alveolar	Palato- (alveolar)	Retroflex	Velar	Glottal
Nasal		m	n	ɲ		ŋ	
Plosive/ Affricate	voiceless	p	t			k	ʔ
Plosive/ Affricate	voiced	b	d	dʒ		g	
Plosive/ Affricate	prenasalized	ᵐp	ⁿt	ⁿtʃ		ᵑk	
Fricative		β	s				h
Trill			r				
Approximant			l	j	(ɭ)		

Notes:

- /h/ acts as a nasal in some respects and causes the nasalization of non-front vowels (e.g., [hampulu'] 'ten'→/haᵐpuluʔ/ with nasal vowels).
- /l/ is realized as retroflex [ɭ] contiguous to non-front vowels.
- /ʔ/ is neutralized word-initially, and is the only consonant that can occur in the coda or word-finally.
- In the Lincio variety of Central Uma, /ⁿtʃ/ is pronounced /ns/.
- The semivowel [j] is rare, found mainly in loan words.
- The affricate /tʃ/ is found only following /n/, i.e., in the prenasalized stop /ⁿtʃ/.

Orthographic notes:

- /β/ is 'w'
- /ɲ/ is 'ny'
- /ŋ/ is 'ng'
- /j/ is 'y'
- /dʒ/ is 'j'
- /tʃ/ is 'c'
- /ʔ/ is an apostrophe or simply 'ʔ'

=== Vowels ===
Vowel inventory
	Front	Central	Back
Close	i		u
Close-Mid	e		o
Open		a	

== Pronouns ==
Pronominals
	Free	ABS	ERG	GEN
1P (SG)	akuʔ	-a	ku-	-ku
1P (PL.ex)	kaiʔ	-kai	ki-	-kai
1P (PL.in)	kitaʔ	-ta	ta-	-ta
2P (SG)	iko	-ko	nu-	-nu
2P (PL)	koiʔ	-koi	ni-	-ni
3P (SG)	hiʔa	-i	na-	-na
3P (PL)	hiraʔ	-ra	ra-	-ra

Notes:

- ABS refers to pronominals in the absolutive case, while ERG refers to the ergative and GEN to the genitive.
- 1P means 'first person,' 2P means 'second person,' and 3P means 'third person.'
- (SG) means 'singular' and (PL) means 'plural.' (PL.ex) means 'plural exclusive' and (PL.in) means 'plural inclusive.'
- [∅-] means that ∅ is a proclitic.
- [-∅] means that ∅ is an enclitic.
- In the Tobaku, Tolee', and Winatu dialects, the possessives [-nu] and [-ni] are [-mu] and [-mi] respectively.
- In the Tolee' and Winatu dialects, the absolutives [-kai] and [-koi] are [-kami] and [-komi] respectively. The free forms [kaiʔ] and [koiʔ] are [kamiʔ] and [komiʔ] respectively.

== Numerals ==
The cardinal numbers from 1 to 10 are:

1. isaʔ
2. dua
3. tolu
4. opoʔ
5. lima
6. ono
7. pitu
8. walu
9. sio
10. hampuluʔ

== Classification of Uma varieties ==
Ethnologue (17th ed., 2013) recognizes seven dialects of Uma.

- Bana
- Benggaulu (= Bingkolu)
- Kantewu (= Central Uma)
- Aria (= Southern Uma)
- Tobaku (= Ompa, Dompa, Western Uma)
- Tolee' (= Eastern Uma)
- Winatu (= Northern Uma)

Martens (2014) recognized six major dialects of Uma, noting that the Tori'untu dialect is nearly extinct due to the encroachment of the Kantewu dialect and non-Uma languages.

- Kantewu (= Central)
- Southern
- Tolee'
- Tobaku
- Winatu
- Tori'untu

Martens also identifies two dialects closely related to Uma spoken in the Pasangkayu Regency.

- Sarudu
- Benggaulu (= Bingkolu)

== Bibliography ==
- Martens, Michael (1988a). "Notes on Uma Verbs". In Steinhauer, H. (ed.). Papers in Western Austronesian Linguistics No. 4. Pacific Linguistics Series A – No. 79. Canberra: The Australian National University. pp. 167–237. doi:10.15144/PL-A79.167. hdl:1885/145108. ISBN 0-85883-3832.
- Martens, Martha A.; Martens, Michael P. (1988). "Some Notes on the Inelegant Glottal: A Problem in Uma Phonology". In Steinhauer, H. (ed.). Papers in Western Austronesian Linguistics No. 4. Pacific Linguistics Series A – No. 79. Canberra: The Australian National University. pp. 279–281. doi:10.15144/PL-A79.279. hdl:1885/145108. ISBN 0-85883-3832.
