= Sedoa language =

Austronesian language spoken in Sulawesi, Indonesia

Sedoa
- Tawailia
- Native to: Indonesia
- Region: Sulawesi
- Ethnicity: Sedoa people; 4,000 (2007)
- Native speakers: 900 in the village (2009); 3,000 ethnic Sedoa live outside the village, but most do not speak the language
- Language family: Austronesian: Malayo-Polynesian; Celebic; Kaili–Pamona; Northern; Sedoa

Language codes
- ISO 639-3: tvw
- Glottolog: sedo1237

Sedoa is an Austronesian language of Central Sulawesi, Indonesia. It belongs to the Kaili–Pamona branch of the Celebic subgroup.
