= Bihara =

Railway station in Assam, India

Bihara is a village in the outskirts of Silchar Town in Cachar district of Assam, India. This village is known for some major religious centers in the area.

Bengali and Meitei (Manipuri) are the official languages of this place.

== Transport ==
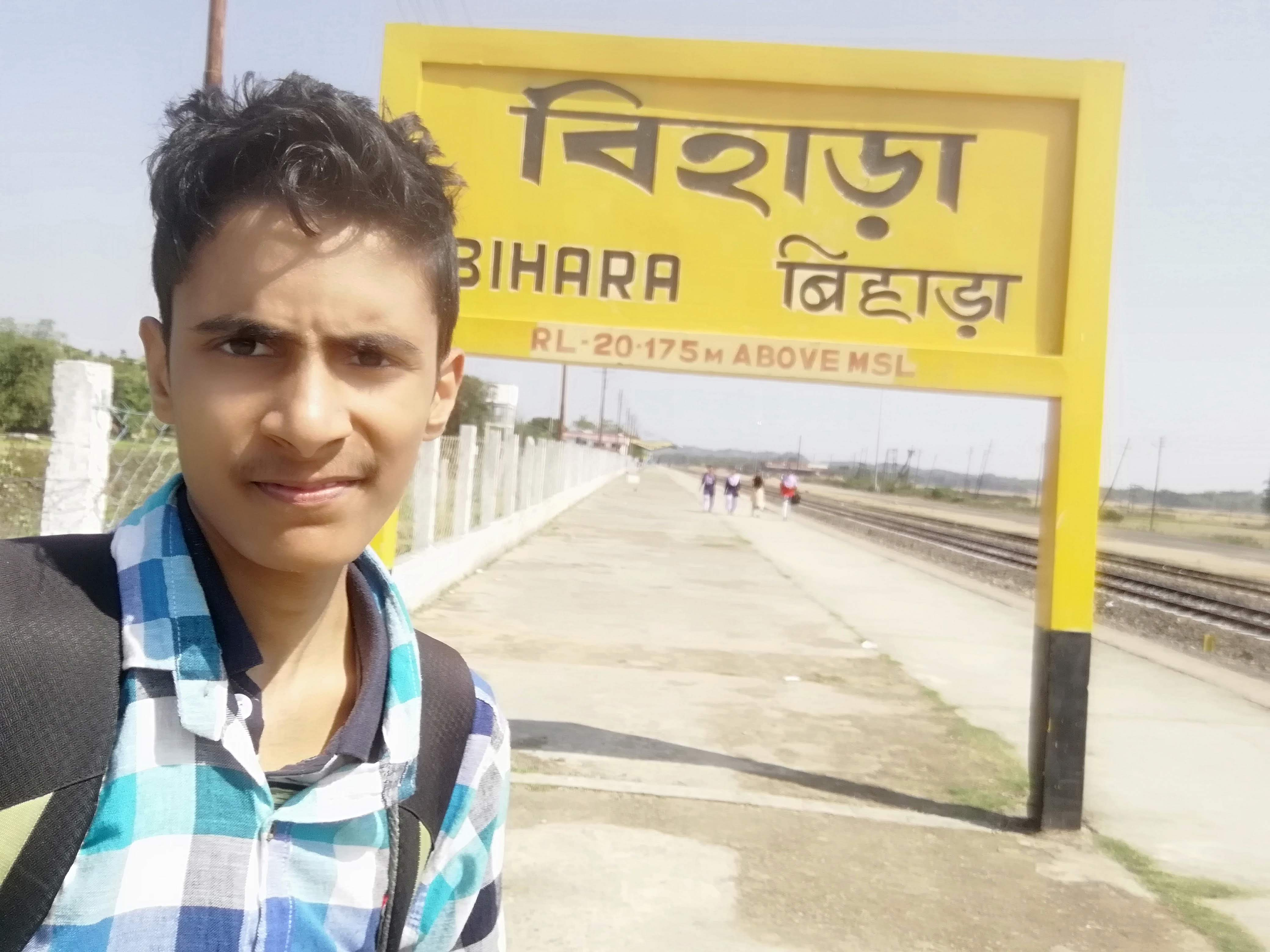
Bihara Station Selfie (Person)

Bihara Railway Station is situated in Chandranathpur, Assam. Station code of Bihara is BHZ. Here are some trains that are passing through Bihara railway station like

- 15615 – Guwahati Silchar Express
- 15616 – Silchar Guwahati Express
- 13173 – Sealdah–Sabroom Kanchanjungha Express
- 13174 – Silchar-Sabroom Kanchanjungha Express
- 13175 – Sealdah–Silchar Kanchanjungha Express
- 13176 – Silchar-Sealdah Kanchanjungha Express
