= Rampi language =

Austronesian language spoken in Sulawesi, Indonesia

Rampi
- Native to: Indonesia
- Region: Sulawesi
- Ethnicity: Rampi
- Native speakers: 10,000 (2006)
- Language family: Austronesian: Malayo-Polynesian; Celebic; Kaili–Pamona; Southern; Rampi
- Dialects: Leboni

Language codes
- ISO 639-3: lje
- Glottolog: ramp1243

Rampi is a language of Central and South Sulawesi, Indonesia. The main speakers are located in the Rampi district in North Luwu, besides that, the Rampi people also migrated to the north of Lake Poso who are known as Leboni dialect speakers.

== Classification ==
Rampi is classified as a Kaili–Pamona language by Ethnologue 23. Zobel (2020) classifies Rampi as a separate branch coordinate to South Sulawesi and Celebic.
