= Kaili language =

Austronesian language of Sulawesi, Indonesia

Kaili
- Basa Kaili
- Native to: Indonesia
- Region: Central Sulawesi
- Ethnicity: Kaili
- Native speakers: 430,000 (2007)
- Language family: Austronesian: Malayo-Polynesian; Celebic; Kaili–Pamona; Northern; Kaili
- Dialects: Ledo; Inde; Da'a; Unde; Baras; Ado; Edo; Rai; Doi; Tae

Language codes
- ISO 639-3: Variously: lew – Ledo Kaili kzf – Da'a Kaili unz – Unde Kaili brs – Baras
- Glottolog: comm1248
- ELP: Baras
- Map of languages on the island of Sulawesi, Kaili-Pamona languages is colored in dark blue along with other Celebic languages.

Kaili (Basa Kaili) is an Austronesian dialect cluster of the Celebic branch, and is one of the principal languages of Central Sulawesi. The heartland of the Kaili area is the broad Palu River valley which stretches southward from Central Sulawesi's capital city, Palu. Kaili is also spoken in the mountains which rise on both sides of this valley, and along the coasts of the Makassar Strait and the Gulf of Tomini.

== Dialects ==
Taking a fine-grade view, it is possible to distinguish sixteen regional varieties of Kaili. Following the practice of Kaili people themselves, each variety is named after its negator. For example, in the Tawaili region northeast of Palu, Kaili speakers use rai as their word for 'no,' while speakers in the Parigi region on the Gulf of Tomini use tara. These two varieties can be referred to as 'Kaili Rai' and 'Kaili Tara,' irrespective of whether one intends for these varieties to be regarded as languages, dialects, or subdialects. These varieties can also be referred to as 'Tawaili' and 'Parigi.'

The following table is a list of lowest-level Kaili varieties, presented by negator and alternate name(s) by which each has been known.

Negator	Other name(s)
ende	ToriBara, Baras
tado	To ri Io, Torio, Toriu
inde	To Kanggone, Banja
da'a	Dombu, To Dombu
unde	Loli, Lole
ndepuu	Ganti
ledo	Palu
doi	Mamboro, Kayu Malue
ija	Sigi
ado	Pakuli
edo	Sibalaya, Sidondo
taa	Palolo
rai	Tawaili, Tawaili-Sindue
raio	Kori
tara	Parigi, Pahigi
ta'a	Sausu, Dolago-Sausu

== Classification of Kaili varieties ==
=== Adriani 1914 ===
The linguist Nicolaus Adriani recognized eight languages. In this early work, several Kaili varieties were as yet unknown to the author.

- Tawaili (= Rai)
- Palu (= Ledo)
- Lole (= Unde)
- Ganti (= Ndepuu)
- Sigi (= Ija)
- Pakuli (= Ado)
- Sidondo (= Edo)
- Parigi (= Tara)
- Sausu (= Ta’a)

=== Esser 1938 ===
The linguist S. J. Esser divided Kaili into western, central and eastern groups. Esser was unclear whether his divisions represented dialects or languages, but Noorduyn concluded he intended one language with three principal dialects.

- West Kaili (= Ende, Tado, Inde, Da’a, Unde, Ndepuu)
- Central Kaili (= Ledo, Ado, Edo, Ija, Taa)
- East Kaili (= Rai, Tara, Ta’a)

=== Kruyt 1938 ===
Using anthropological rather than linguistic criteria, Alb. C. Kruyt divided peoples of this area into three 'rings' or 'circles.'

- Pakawa ring (= Ende, Tado, Inde, Da’a)
- Kaili ring (= Unde, Ndepuu, Rai, Tara, Ta’a, Doi, Ledo)
- Sigi ring (= Ado, Edo, Ija, Taa)

=== Barr and Barr 1979 ===
Barr and Barr recognized one language with six dialects (they also included Kulawi as a seventh dialect, but left Ende and Tado out of consideration since those varieties are not spoken in Central Sulawesi).

- Pekava (= Inde, Da’a)
- Banava (= Unde, Ndepuu)
- Tawaili-Sindue (= Rai)
- Parigi (= Tara, Ta’a)
- Palu (= Doi, Ledo)
- Sigi ( = Ado, Edo, Ija, Taa)

=== Ethnologue 2009 ===
The Ethnologue (16th ed., 2009) recognizes four languages. In this subclassification, Kaili Ledo is best regarded as an 'everything else' category 'awaiting further research.'

- Baras (= Ende)
- Kaili Da’a (= Tado, Inde, Da’a)
- Kaili Unde (= Unde, Ndepuu)
- Kaili Ledo (= Raio, Rai, Tara, Ta’a, Doi, Ledo, Ado, Edo, Ija, Taa)
