= The Journal of Investing =

- Discipline: Finance, investment
- Language: English
- Edited by: Brian Bruce

Publication details
- History: 1992–present
- Publisher: Portfolio Management Research
- Frequency: Quarterly

Standard abbreviations
- ISO 4: J. Invest.

Indexing
- ISSN: 1068-0896 (print); 2168-8613 (web)
- LCCN: 93640512
- OCLC no.: 231871201

Links
- Journal homepage; Online access; Online archive

The Journal of Investing is a quarterly peer-reviewed academic journal that covers research on investment management, asset allocation, performance measurement, benchmarking, mutual funds, investing strategies such as 130/30 funds, global allocation, and practical investment ideas and portfolio strategies for the institutional buy-side such as pension funds. It is published by Portfolio Management Research and the editor-in-chief is Brian R. Bruce (Hillcrest Asset Management).

== Reception ==
The School of Management of Cranfield University ranked the journal C (on a scale of A to D) in an internal document recommending outlets for management and business research to their faculty. Similarly, a 2011 ranking of finance journals by Cranfield classed the journal 2 (on a scale of 1 to 4, with 4 being the highest).

== Abstracting and indexing ==
The journal is abstracted and indexed in EBSCO databases, Emerging Sources Citation Index, ProQuest databases, and Scopus.
