= Bada language =

Austronesian language spoken in Sulawesi, Indonesia

Bada
- Native to: Indonesia
- Region: Sulawesi
- Ethnicity: Bada people
- Native speakers: 10,000 (2010)
- Language family: Austronesian: Malayo-Polynesian; Celebic; Kaili–Pamona; Southern; Badaic; Bada

Language codes
- ISO 639-3: bhz
- Glottolog: bada1261

Bada (also Badaʼ) is an Austronesian language spoken in the South Lore district of Central Sulawesi, Indonesia. Together with Napu and Behoa, it belongs to the Badaic subgroup.

== Grammar ==
Bada has the following pronoun sets:

	independent	enclitic	prefixed	suffixed
1.sg.	kodoʔ (koʔo)	-aʔ (-naʔ)	ku-	-(ng)kuʔ
2.sg.	io	-koʔ	nu-	-mu
3.sg.	ia	---	na-	-na
1.pl. inclusive	kitaʔ	-keʔ	ta-	-(n)taʔ
1.pl. exclusive	kaiʔ	-kaʔ	ki-	-(ng)kiʔ
2.pl.	kamiu	-komi	ni-	-mi
3.pl.	hera	-heʔ	ra	-nda
