= Lore Lindu National Park =

National parks of Indonesia

- IUCN category II (national park)
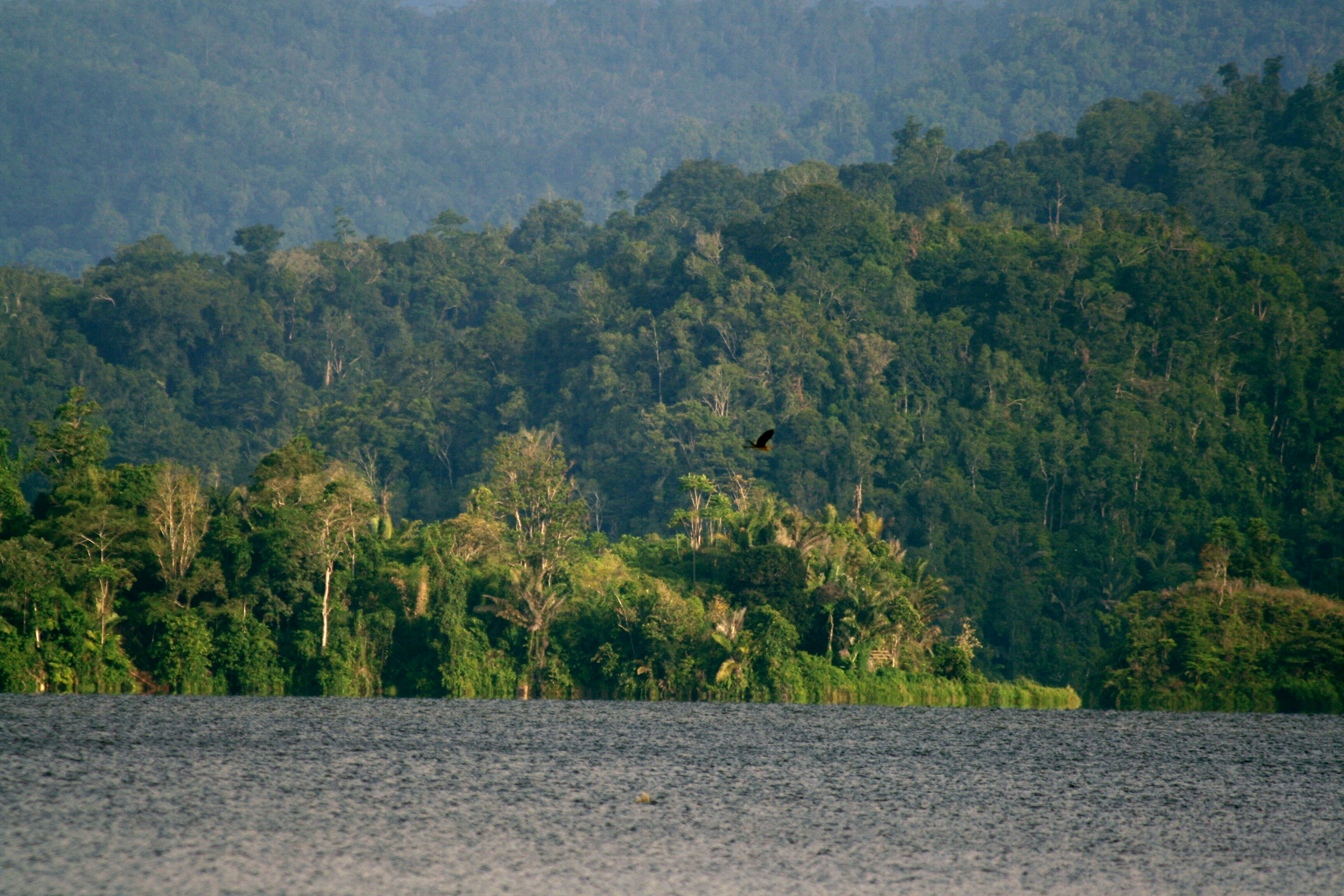
- Lake Lindu in the national park

- Location within Sulawesi
- Location: Central Sulawesi, Indonesia
- Nearest city: Palu
- Coordinates: 1°28′S 120°11′E
- Area: 2,180 km^{2} (840 sq mi)
- Established: 1982
- Visitors: 2,000 (in 2007)
- Governing body: Ministry of Environment and Forestry

Lore Lindu National Park is a protected area of forest on the Indonesian island of Sulawesi, in the province of Central Sulawesi. The Indonesian national park is 2,180 km^{2} covering both lowland and montane forests (200 to 2,610 meters above mean sea level). It provides habitat to numerous rare species, including 77 bird species endemic to Sulawesi. The national park is designated as part of the UNESCO World Network of Biosphere Reserves. In addition to its rich wildlife, the park also contains megaliths dating from between 3000 BC to 1300 AD.

The easiest access to visit the national park is from Palu to Kamarora (50 kilometers in 2.5 hours drive). Due to up to 4,000 mm of rainfall per year in the southern part of the national park, the best time to visit is from July to September.

== Geography and climate ==
The boundaries of the park are defined by the Palolo Valley to the north, Napu Valley to the east and Bada Valley to the south. The western boundary is formed by a series of narrow valleys, known collectively as the Kulawi Valley. The Palolo, Napu, Lindu and Besoa valleys were once lakes, now partially filled with sediment. Lake Lindu (Danau Lindu) is the only large lake remaining today. The altitude ranges from 200 to 2,500 m above sea-level.

The climate is tropical with high humidity. Temperatures vary only a few degrees over the course of the year, between 26 °C–32 °C in lowland areas. The temperature drops in the highland areas about 6 °C (11 °F) with every 1,100 metres (3,600 ft) rise in altitude. The heaviest rain period occurs during the monsoon which lasts from November to April.

== Flora and fauna ==
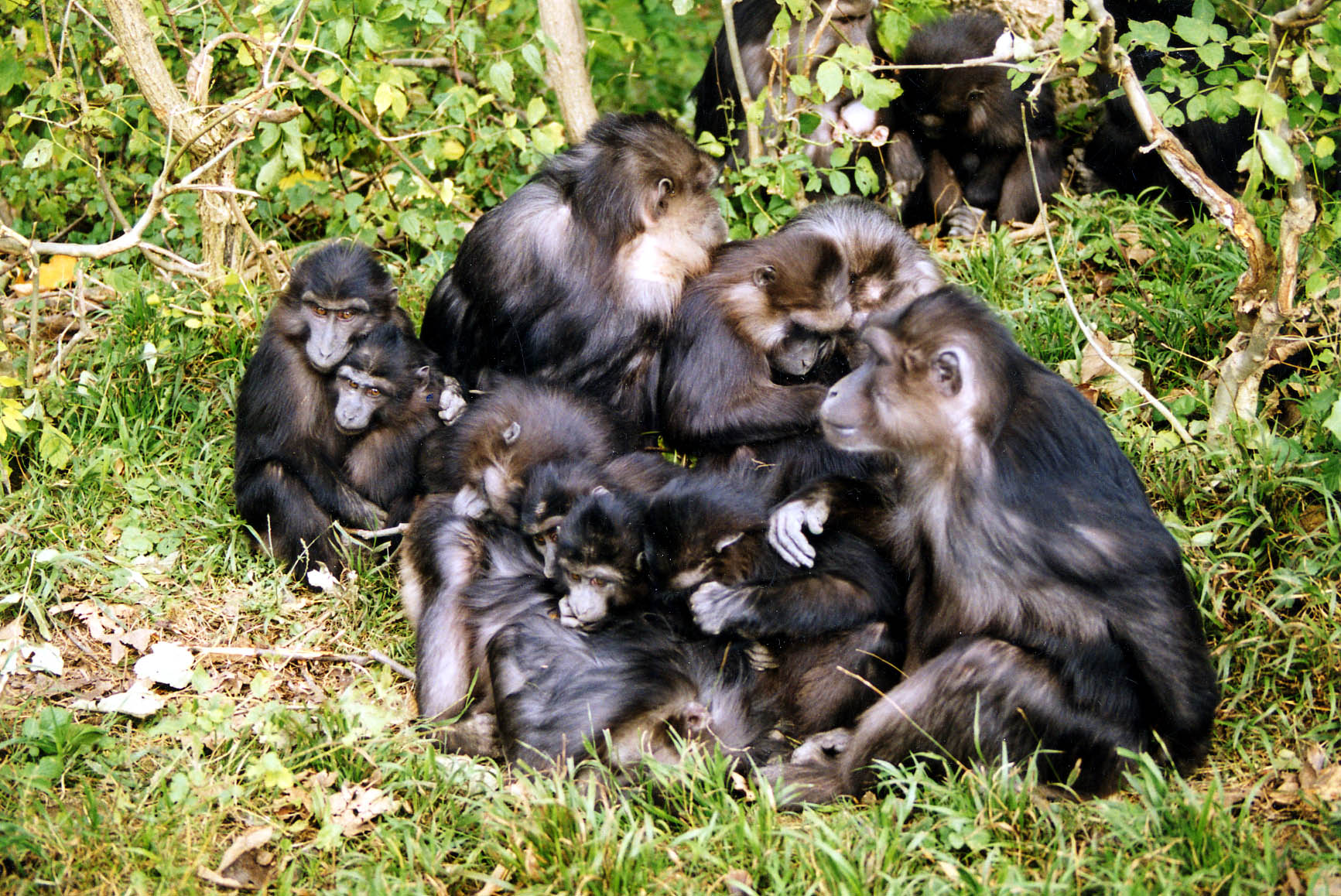
The park provides habitat to the Tonkean macaque, endemic to Sulawesi

Lore Lindu National Park stretches over multiple ecosystem types, including lowland tropical forest, sub-montane forest, montane forest, as well as sub-alpine forest at altitudes over 2,000 metres (6,600 ft).

Plant species include Eucalyptus deglupta, Pterospermum celebicum, Cananga odorata, Gnetum gnemon, Castanopsis argentea, Agathis philippinensis, Phyllocladus hypophyllus, medicinal plants, and rattans.

Endemic Sulawesi mammals found in the national park include the Tonkean macaque (Macaca tonkeana), lowland anoa (Bubalus depressicornis), North Sulawesi babirusa (Babyrousa celebensis), pygmy tarsier (Tarsius pumilus), Dian's tarsier (Tarsius dianae), Sulawesi bear cuscus (Ailurops ursinus), Sulawesi dwarf cuscus (Strigocuscus celebensis), Celebes rat (Taeromys celebensis), Sulawesi palm civet (Macrogalidia musschenbroekii) and Sulawesi stripe-faced fruit bat (Styloctenium wallacei). Endemic Sulawesi birds found in Lore Lindu include the maleo (Macrocephalon maleo), purple-bearded bee-eater (Meropogon forsteni), geomalia (Geomalia heinrichi), and many others. Reptiles and amphibians include the gold snake (Elaphe erythrura and E. janseni) and Sulawesian toad (Ingerophrynus celebensis). The fish Oryzias bonneorum and Oryzias sarasinorum, and the Parathelphusid crab Parathelphusa linduensis are endemic to Lake Lindu.

== Megaliths ==
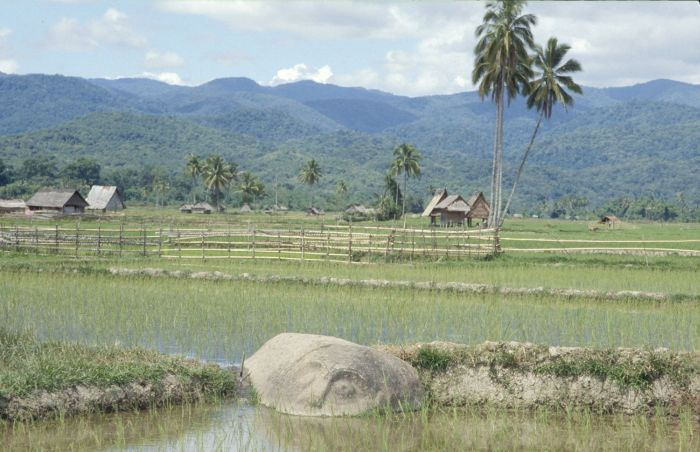
Megalithic stone in a rice field, Central Sulawesi ("Baula", Bada Valley)

There are over 400 granite megaliths in the area, of which about 30 represent human forms. They vary in size from a few centimetres to ca.4.5 metres (15 ft). The original purpose of the megaliths is unknown. Other megaliths in the area are large stone pots (Kalamba) accompanied by stone lids (Tutu'na). The megaliths are spread over the Napu, Behoa (Pokekea Megalithic Site) and Bada valleys. Various archaeological studies have dated the carvings from between 3000 BC to 1300 AD.

== Human habitation ==
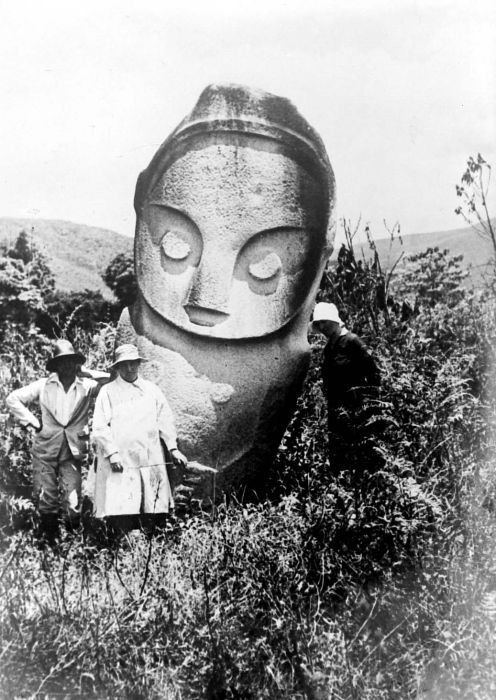
Three Europeans by a megalith ("Palindo", Bada Valley)

Surrounding the park there are 117 villages, from which 62 are located on the borders of the park and one is within the park. The local population belongs to the Kaili, Kulavi and Lore ethnic groups. There are also immigrants from South Sulawesi, Java and Bali.

== Conservation and threats ==
Lore Lindu has been declared a UNESCO Biosphere Reserve in 1978. The national park was formed through the amalgamation of three existing reserves: the Lore Kalamanta Nature Reserve, the Lake Lindu Recreation and Protection Forest, and the Lore Lindu Wildlife Reserve. While in 1982 an area of 2,310 km^{2} has been "declared" for the national park, when the park has been officially designated in 1999, its size was reduced to 2,180 km^{2}.

Deforestation as result of illegal logging and land encroachment for agricultural activities is one of the main threats to the park. Management challenges include lack of awareness of the importance of forest preservation and lack of law enforcement.

Since 2000, the Indonesian-German Collaborative Research Center "STORMA" (Stability of the Rainforest Margin in Indonesia) is intensively investigating Lore Lindu National Park and its buffer zone. STORMA's analysis of the effect of environmental protection on the level of deforestation in the park, suggests a reduction of the deforestation rate of around 9% as result of the protected areas status of the park. This estimate was based on a methodology involving propensity score matching rather than the conventional satellite image comparison.

== Tourism ==
To boost tourism, the Lore Lindu National Park decided to develop access road, electricity, clean water and resorts for visitors who visit the breeding ground for Maleo birds Macrocephalon maleo and the Tambing Lake. Nowadays the visitors are mainly college students and researchers from abroad.

== See also ==
- List of national parks of Indonesia
