= 2021 Liga 3 West Sulawesi =

Tournament details
- Venue(s): Gelora Djiwa Stadium, Pasangkayu Regency
- Dates: 18 November–4 December 2021
- Teams: 9

Final positions
- Champions: PS Sandeq (1st title)
- Runners-up: OTP37

The 2021 Liga 3 West Sulawesi was the sixth season of Liga 3 West Sulawesi as a qualifying round for the national round of the 2021–22 Liga 3.

OTP37 were the defending champion.

== Teams ==
There are 9 teams participated in the league this season.

Team	Location
Gasman Majene	Majene
OTP37	Mamuju
Persema Mamasa	Mamasa
Persimaju Mamuju	Mamuju
Pespa Pasangkayu	Pasangkayu
PS Mamuju Tengah	Central Mamuju
PS Matra	Pasangkayu
PS Sandeq	Polewali Mandar
Sarudu	Pasangkayu

== Venues ==
- Gelora Djiwa Stadium, Pasangkayu Regency

== Group stage ==
=== Group A ===
Pos	Team	Pld	W	D	L	GF	GA	GD	Pts	Qualification
1	PS Matra	4	3	0	1	5	3	+2	9	Qualified
2	Sarudu	4	2	2	0	6	2	+4	8	Qualified
3	Gasman Majene	4	1	2	1	8	5	+3	5	
4	Persema Mamasa	4	1	2	1	8	6	+2	5	
5	Pespa Pasangkayu	4	0	0	4	1	12	−11	0	

Source: 2021 Liga 3 West Sulawesi

=== Group B ===
Pos	Team	Pld	W	D	L	GF	GA	GD	Pts	Qualification
1	PS Sandeq	3	2	1	0	8	4	+4	7	Qualified
2	OTP37	3	2	0	1	6	4	+2	6	Qualified
3	Persimaju Mamuju	3	1	0	2	5	9	−4	3	
4	PS Mamuju Tengah	3	0	1	2	3	5	−2	1	

Source: 2021 Liga 3 West Sulawesi

== Knockout stage ==
Semifinals
A1	PS Matra	0
B2	OTP37	1
B1	PS Sandeq	0 (6)
A2	Sarudu	0 (5)

Finals
OTP37	0
PS Sandeq	2

=== Semifinal ===
November 30, 2021
15.00 UTC+8

PS Matra	0–1	OTP37
	Report

Gelora Djiwa Stadium, Pasangkayu Regency

December 1, 2021
15.00 UTC+8

PS Sandeq	0–0 (6–5)	Sarudu
	Report

Gelora Djiwa Stadium, Pasangkayu Regency

=== Final ===
December 4, 2021
15.00 UTC+8

OTP37	0–2	PS Sandeq
	Report

Gelora Djiwa Stadium, Pasangkayu Regency
