= Regencies of West Sulawesi =

When created in 2004, the Indonesian province of West Sulawesi (Provinsie Sulawesi Barat) was divided into five regencies (kabupaten), including the recently created regencies of Mamasa, which had been cut out of Polewali Mamasa Regency on 10 April 2002, and North Mamaju (Mamuju Utara), which had been cut out of Mamuju Regency on 25 February 2003. A sixth regency - Central Mamuju (Mamuju Tengah) - was cut out of the existing Mamuju Regency on 14 December 2012. North Mamuju Regency was renamed as Pasangkayu Regency in March 2018. These regencies are listed below with their areas and their populations at the 2010 and 2020 censuses, together with the official estimates as at mid 2025. The table also includes the locations of the regency administrative capitals and the Human Development Index for each regency as at 2014.

| Kode Wilayah | Name of Regency | Area in km^{2} | Pop'n Census 2010 | Pop'n Census 2020' | Pop'n Estimate mid 2025 | Capital | HDI 2014 estimate |
|---|---|---|---|---|---|---|---|
| 76.05 | Majene Regency | 900.53 | 151,107 | 174,407 | 186,337 | Majene | 0.637 (Medium) |
| 76.04 | Polewali Mandar Regency | 2,074.19 | 396,120 | 478,534 | 507,212 | Polewali | 0.600 (Medium) |
| 76.03 | Mamasa Regency | 3,016.13 | 140,082 | 163,383 | 175,508 | Mamasa | 0.628 (Medium) |
| 76.02 | Mamuju Regency | 4,942.04 | 231,324 | 278,764 | 301,879 | Karema, Mamuju | 0.647 (Medium) |
| 76.01 | Pasangkayu Regency | 2,901.70 | 134,369 | 188,861 | 206,581 | Pasangkayu | 0.640 (Medium) |
| 76.06 | Central Mamuju Regency (Mamuju Tengah) | 2,756.08 | 105,649 | 135,280 | 147,788 | Tobadak | 0.614 (Medium) |
| | Total Province | 16,590.67 | 1,158,651 | 1,419,229 | 1,525,335 | Mamuju | 0.622 (Medium) |
