= 2025–26 Liga 4 West Sulawesi =

Liga 4 West Sulawesi
- Season: 2025–26
- Dates: 20–28 April 2026
- Teams: 7
- Champions: Persimaju
- Runner up: PS Taeso Putra
- National phase: Persimaju
- Matches: 12
- Goals: 45 (3.75 per match)

The 2025–26 Liga 4 West Sulawesi (also known as the 2025–26 Liga 4 West Sulawesi Governor's Cup for sponsorship reasons) is the second season of Liga 4 West Sulawesi after the restructuring of the Indonesian football league system. The competition serves as a qualifying round for the national phase of the 2025–26 Liga 4.

The competition is organized by the West Sulawesi Provincial PSSI Association and kicked off on 20 April 2026 at the Manakarra Stadium in Mamuju.

== Teams ==
A total of 7 teams participated in this competition based on the official draw conducted on 18 April 2026.

=== Location map ===
Locations of teams competing in the 2025–26 Liga 4 West Sulawesi:
Mamuju – OTP37, Persimaju Mamuju, PS Taeso Putra

=== Participating teams ===
| No | Teams | Location | 2024–25 season |
|---|---|---|---|
| 1 | Gasman | Majene Regency | Semi-finalist |
| 2 | PS Mamuju Tengah | Central Mamuju Regency | Group stage |
| 3 | OTP37 | Mamuju Regency | — |
| 4 | Persimaju | Mamuju Regency | — |
| 5 | PS Taeso Putra | Mamuju Regency | Group stage |
| 6 | PS Matra | Pasangkayu Regency | Runner-up |
| 7 | Mandar United | Polewali Mandar Regency | Semi-finalist |

== Venue ==
All match will held in Manakarra Stadium, Mamuju Regency.

== Group stage ==
=== Group A ===
| Pos | Team | Pld | W | D | L | GF | GA | GD | Pts | Qualification | TAE | OTP | GSM | MTG |
|---|---|---|---|---|---|---|---|---|---|---|---|---|---|---|
| 1 | PS Taeso Putra | 3 | 2 | 1 | 0 | 6 | 3 | +3 | 7 | Qualification to the knockout stage | | | | 3–2 |
| 2 | OTP37 | 3 | 2 | 0 | 1 | 5 | 2 | +3 | 6 | Qualification to the knockout stage | 0–2 | | 3–0 | |
| 3 | Gasman | 3 | 0 | 2 | 1 | 2 | 5 | −3 | 2 | | 1–1 | | | 1–1 |
| 4 | PS Mamuju Tengah | 3 | 0 | 1 | 2 | 3 | 6 | −3 | 1 | | | 0–2 | | |

Source: PSSI West Sulawesi

==== Match details ====
Matchday 1 (20 April 2026)
20 April 2026
14:00 WITA

| Gasman | 1–1 | PS Mamuju Tengah |
|---|---|---|
| | Report |

Manakarra Stadium, Mamuju
20 April 2026
16:00 WITA

| OTP37 | 0–2 | PS Taeso Putra |
|---|---|---|
| | Report |

Manakarra Stadium, Mamuju

Matchday 2 (22 April 2026)
22 April 2026
14:00 WITA

| PS Mamuju Tengah | 0–2 | OTP37 |
|---|---|---|
| | Report |

Manakarra Stadium, Mamuju
22 April 2026
16:00 WITA

| Gasman | 1–1 | PS Taeso Putra |
|---|---|---|
| | Report |

Manakarra Stadium, Mamuju

Matchday 3 (24 April 2026)
24 April 2026
14:00 WITA

| OTP37 | 3–0 | Gasman |
|---|---|---|
| | Report |

Manakarra Stadium, Mamuju
24 April 2026
16:00 WITA

| PS Taeso Putra | 3–2 | PS Mamuju Tengah |
|---|---|---|
| | Report |

Manakarra Stadium, Mamuju

=== Group B ===
| Pos | Team | Pld | W | D | L | GF | GA | GD | Pts | Qualification | PMJ | MUN | MTR |
|---|---|---|---|---|---|---|---|---|---|---|---|---|---|
| 1 | Persimaju | 2 | 2 | 0 | 0 | 11 | 0 | +11 | 6 | Qualification to the knockout stage | | 4–0 | |
| 2 | Mandar United | 2 | 1 | 0 | 1 | 1 | 4 | −3 | 3 | Qualification to the knockout stage | | | 1–0 |
| 3 | PS Matra | 2 | 0 | 0 | 2 | 0 | 8 | −8 | 0 | | 0–7 | | |

Source: PSSI West Sulawesi

==== Match details ====
Matchday 1 (21 April 2026)
21 April 2026
16:00 WITA

| PS Matra | 0–7 | Persimaju |
|---|---|---|
| | Report |

Manakarra Stadium, Mamuju

Matchday 2 (23 April 2026)
23 April 2026
16:00 WITA

| Mandar United | 1–0 | PS Matra |
|---|---|---|
| | Report |

Manakarra Stadium, Mamuju

Matchday 3 (25 April 2026)
25 April 2026
16:00 WITA

| Persimaju | 4–0 | Mandar United |
|---|---|---|
| | Report |

Manakarra Stadium, Mamuju

== Knockout stage ==
The winners and runners-up of each group advance to the knockout stage. All matches are held at Manakarra Stadium, Mamuju.

=== Bracket ===
Semi-finals
26 April 2026 — Manakarra Stadium, Mamuju
A1 | PS Taeso Putra | 5
B2 | Mandar United | 4
26 April 2026 — Manakarra Stadium, Mamuju
B1 | Persimaju | 3
A2 | OTP37 | 1

Final
28 April 2026 — Manakarra Stadium, Mamuju
SF1 | PS Taeso Putra | 0
SF2 | Persimaju | 4

=== Semi-finals ===
26 April 2026
14:00 WITA

| PS Taeso Putra | 5–4 | Mandar United |
|---|---|---|
| | Report |

Manakarra Stadium, Mamuju
26 April 2026
16:00 WITA

| Persimaju | 3–1 | OTP37 |
|---|---|---|
| | Report |

Manakarra Stadium, Mamuju

=== Final ===
28 April 2026
15:30 WITA

| PS Taeso Putra | 0–4 | Persimaju |
|---|---|---|
| | Report |

Manakarra Stadium, Mamuju

== See also ==
- 2025–26 Liga 4
- 2025–26 Liga 4 South Sulawesi
- 2025–26 Liga 4 Central Sulawesi
- 2025–26 Liga 4 North Sulawesi
- 2025–26 Liga 4 Southeast Sulawesi
- 2025–26 Liga 4 Gorontalo
