= COVID-19 pandemic in West Sulawesi =

- Disease: COVID-19
- Pathogen: SARS-CoV-2
- Location: West Sulawesi, Indonesia
- First outbreak: Wuhan, Hubei, China
- Index case: Mamuju Regency
- Arrival date: 29 March 2020

The COVID-19 pandemic in West Sulawesi is a part of wider outbreak in Indonesia. The virus was confirmed to reach the province on 29 March 2020. As of 8 December 2021, there are confirmed 12,357 cases detected with 12,007 recoveries and 346 deaths.

== Background ==
On 12 January 2020, the World Health Organization (WHO) confirmed that a novel coronavirus was the cause of a respiratory illness in a cluster of people in Wuhan City, Hubei Province, China, which was reported to the WHO on 31 December 2019.

The case fatality ratio for COVID-19 has been much lower than SARS of 2003, but the transmission has been significantly greater, with a significant total death toll.

== Timeline ==
=== April 2020 ===
The provincial government took measures such as spraying disinfectant on public spaces in late March. On 27 March, Ali Baal Masdar, governor of West Sulawesi implemented semi-lockdown, closing public spaces, and movement restriction from outside of the province to prevent the spread of the virus. Tourist destinations were also closed as early as 22 March. The provincial government threatened sanctions against government civil servants that were found on public cafes on 24 March 2020. The province also sent letter to Ministry of Transportation to close ports in the province and suspend all ship routes to the province. The province confirmed its first positive case on 29 March 2020.

=== May 2020 ===
On 5 May 2020, new 12 positive cases were confirmed thought to be from local transmission in Polewali Mandar Regency. In the same day, there are total 58 cases in the entire province, with 32 cases from Central Mamuju Regency, 15 cases from Polewali Mandar Regency, 5 cases from Pasangkayu, 4 cases in Mamuju Regency, and 2 cases from Majene Regency.

=== January 2021 ===
On 6 January, the number of cases were 2,020 positive case. The province was struck by 2021 West Sulawesi earthquake on 16 January 2021, which destroyed much of healthcare infrastructures and government buildings. As the result, the pandemic that previously relatively-contained start to worsen as many positive cases were found in refugee sites. Two main hospitals in the province were destroyed by the earthquake. The government quickly tried to contain the spread of the virus by testing refugees with COVID-19 antigens. Emergency tents were set up in Manakarra Stadion, Mamuju as emergency hospitals. Groups vulnerable to COVID-19 were separated from the rest of the refugee to avoid deaths from the virus.

=== February 2021 ===
On late February, it was found that due to the earthquake which destroys much of the healthcare infrastructure, the number of positive cases have been doubled to 4,701 positive cases as of 15 February. On 19 February, the number have risen again to 5,042 positive cases.
