= List of incumbent regional heads and deputy regional heads in West Sulawesi =

The following is an article about the list of Regional Heads and Deputy Regional Heads in 6 regencies/cities in West Sulawesi who are currently still serving.

== List ==
Regency/ City	Photo of the Regent/ Mayor	Regent/ Mayor	Photo of Deputy Regent/ Mayor	Deputy Regent/ Mayor	Taking Office	End of Office (Planned)	Ref.
Majene; Regency List of Regents/Deputy Regents		Andi Achmad Syukri Tammalele		Andi Ritamariani	20 February 2025	20 February 2030	
Mamasa; Regency List of Regents/Deputy Regents		Welem Sambolangi		Sudirman	20 February 2025	20 February 2030	
Mamuju; Regency List of Regents/Deputy Regents		Sitti Sutinah Suhardi		Yuki Permana	20 February 2025	20 February 2030	
Central Mamuju; Regency List of Regents/Deputy Regents		Arsal Aras		Askary Anwar	20 February 2025	20 February 2030	
Pasangkayu; Regency List of Regents/Deputy Regents		Yaumil Ambo Djiwa		Herny Agus	20 February 2025	20 February 2030	
Polewali Mandar; Regency List of Regents/Deputy Regents		Samsul Mahmud		Andi Nursami Masdar	20 February 2025	20 February 2030	

Notes

- "Commencement of office" is the inauguration date at the beginning or during the current term of office. For acting regents/mayors, it is the date of appointment or extension as acting regent/mayor.
- Based on the Constitutional Court decision Number 27/PUU-XXII/2024, the Governor and Deputy Governor, Regent and Deputy Regent, and Mayor and Deputy Mayor elected in 2020 shall serve until the inauguration of the Governor and Deputy Governor, Regent and Deputy Regent, and Mayor and Deputy Mayor elected in the 2024 national simultaneous elections as long as the term of office does not exceed 5 (five) years.

== See also ==
- West Sulawesi
