= 2024–25 Liga 4 West Sulawesi =

Liga 4 West Sulawesi
- Season: 2024–25
- Dates: 8–17 February 2025
- Champions: PS Sandeq (1st title)
- National phase: PS Sandeq
- Matches: 12
- Goals: 35 (2.92 per match)
- Biggest win: Mandar United 4–0 Balanipa Mandar (8 February 2025); Gasman Majene 4–0 PS Mamuju Tengah (10 February 2025); Balanipa Mandar 1–5 Gasman Majene (12 February 2025)
- Highest scoring: Balanipa Mandar 1–5 Gasman Majene (12 February 2025)

The 2024–25 Liga 4 West Sulawesi will be the inaugural season of Liga 4 West Sulawesi after the structural changes of Indonesian football competition and serves as a qualifying round for the national phase of the 2024–25 Liga 4. The competition will be organised by the West Sulawesi Provincial PSSI Association.

== Teams ==
=== Participating teams ===
A total of 7 teams are competing in this season.

No	Team	Location	2023–24 season
1	PS Matra	Pasangkayu Regency	Semi-finalist
2	PS Mamuju Tengah	Central Mamuju Regency	—
3	PS Taeso Putra	Mamuju Regency	Quarter-finalist
4	Balanipa Mandar	Polewali Mandar Regency	First round (3rd in Group B)
5	Mandar United	Polewali Mandar Regency	Semi-finalist
6	PS Sandeq	Polewali Mandar Regency	Runner-up
7	Gasman Majene	Majene Regency	First round (4th in Group C)

== Schedule ==
The schedule of the competition is as follows.

Round	Matchday	Date
Group stage	Matchday 1	8–10 February 2025
Group stage	Matchday 2	11–12 February 2025
Group stage	Matchday 3	13–14 February 2025
Knockout stage	Semi-final	15–16 February 2025
Knockout stage	Final	17 February 2025

== Group stage ==
A total of 7 teams will be drawn into two groups. The group stage will be played in a home tournament format of single round-robin matches.

The top two teams of each group will qualify for the knockout stage.

=== Group A ===
All matches will be held at H. S. Mengga Stadium, Polewali Mandar.

Pos	Team	Pld	W	D	L	GF	GA	GD	Pts	Qualification	SDQ	MTR	TSO
1	PS Sandeq	2	1	1	0	4	2	+2	4	Qualification to the Knockout stage	—	—	2–2
2	PS Matra	2	1	0	1	4	3	+1	3	Qualification to the Knockout stage	0–2	—	—
3	PS Taeso Putra	2	0	1	1	3	6	−3	1		—	1–4	—

Source: Liga 4 West Sulawesi
Rules for classification: 1) Points; 2) Head-to-head points; 3) Head-to-head goal difference; 4) Head-to-head goals scored; 5) Goal difference; 6) Goals scored; 7) Fair-play points; 8) Draw.

Group A Matches

Matchday 1 (9 February 2025)
9 February 2025
15.00 WITA (UTC+8)

PS Matra	0–2	PS Sandeq
	Report

H. S. Mengga Stadium, Polewali Mandar

Matchday 2 (11 February 2025)
11 February 2025
15.00 WITA (UTC+8)

PS Sandeq	2–2	PS Taeso Putra
	Report

H. S. Mengga Stadium, Polewali Mandar

Matchday 3 (13 February 2025)
13 February 2025
15.00 WITA (UTC+8)

PS Taeso Putra	1–4	PS Matra
	Report

H. S. Mengga Stadium, Polewali Mandar

=== Group B ===
All matches will be held at H. S. Mengga Stadium, Polewali Mandar.

Pos	Team	Pld	W	D	L	GF	GA	GD	Pts	Qualification	MUN	MJN	MJU	BAL
1	Mandar United	3	3	0	0	6	0	+6	9	Qualification to the Knockout stage	—	1–0	—	4–0
2	Gasman Majene	3	2	0	1	9	2	+7	6	Qualification to the Knockout stage	—	—	4–0	—
3	PS Mamuju Tengah	3	0	1	2	2	7	−5	1		0–1	—	—	2–2
4	Balanipa Mandar	3	0	1	2	3	11	−8	1		—	1–5	—	—

Source: Liga 4 West Sulawesi
Rules for classification: 1) Points; 2) Head-to-head points; 3) Head-to-head goal difference; 4) Head-to-head goals scored; 5) Goal difference; 6) Goals scored; 7) Fair-play points; 8) Draw.

Group B Matches

Matchday 1 (8–10 February 2025)
8 February 2025
15.00 WITA (UTC+8)

Mandar United	4–0	Balanipa Mandar
	Report

H. S. Mengga Stadium, Polewali Mandar
10 February 2025
15.00 WITA (UTC+8)

Gasman Majene	4–0	PS Mamuju Tengah
	Report

H. S. Mengga Stadium, Polewali Mandar

Matchday 2 (12 February 2025)
12 February 2025
16.00 WITA (UTC+8)

Balanipa Mandar	1–5	Gasman Majene
	Report

H. S. Mengga Stadium, Polewali Mandar
12 February 2025
16.00 WITA (UTC+8)

PS Mamuju Tengah	0–1	Mandar United
	Report

H. S. Mengga Stadium, Polewali Mandar

Matchday 3 (14 February 2025)
14 February 2025
14.00 WITA (UTC+8)

Mandar United	1–0	Gasman Majene
	Report

H. S. Mengga Stadium, Polewali Mandar
14 February 2025
16.00 WITA (UTC+8)

PS Mamuju Tengah	2–2	Balanipa Mandar
	Report

H. S. Mengga Stadium, Polewali Mandar

== Knockout stage ==
The knockout stage will be played as a single match. If tied after regulation time, extra time and, if necessary, a penalty shoot-out will be used to decide the winning team.

=== Bracket ===
Semi-finals
15 February 2025 — Polewali Mandar
A1	PS Sandeq	2
B2	Gasman Majene	0
16 February 2025 — Polewali Mandar
B1	Mandar United	0 (4)
A2	PS Matra (p)	0 (5)

Final
17 February 2025 — Polewali Mandar
PS Sandeq (p)	1 (4)
PS Matra	1 (3)

=== Semi-finals ===
15 February 2025
15.00 WITA (UTC+8)

PS Sandeq	2–0	Gasman Majene
	Report

H. S. Mengga Stadium, Polewali Mandar

16 February 2025
15.00 WITA (UTC+8)

Mandar United	0–0	PS Matra
	Report
Penalties
	4–5

H. S. Mengga Stadium, Polewali Mandar

=== Final ===
17 February 2025
15.00 WITA (UTC+8)

PS Sandeq	1–1	PS Matra
	Report
Penalties
	4–3

H. S. Mengga Stadium, Polewali Mandar

== See also ==
- 2024–25 Liga 4
