= Tampa Padang Airport =

Airport in Indonesia

Tampa Padang Airport Bandar Udara Tampa Padang
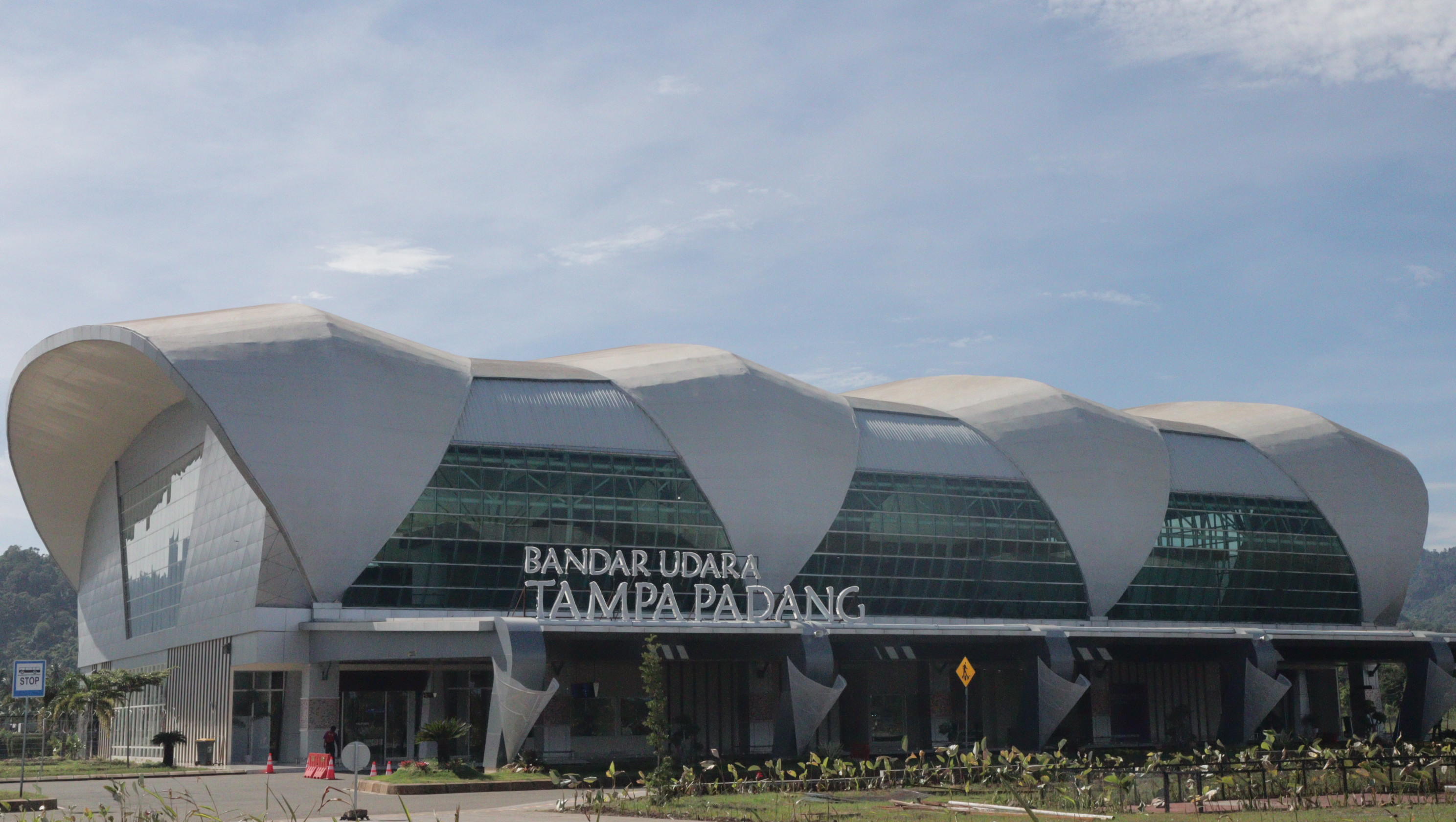
- IATA: MJU; ICAO: WAFJ

Summary
- Airport type: Public
- Owner: Government of Indonesia
- Operator: Directorate General of Civil Aviation
- Serves: Mamuju
- Location: Kalukku, Mamuju Regency, West Sulawesi, Sulawesi Island, Indonesia
- Time zone: WITA (UTC+08:00)
- Elevation AMSL: 2 m (6.6 ft)
- Coordinates: 02°35′12″S 119°01′45″E

Maps
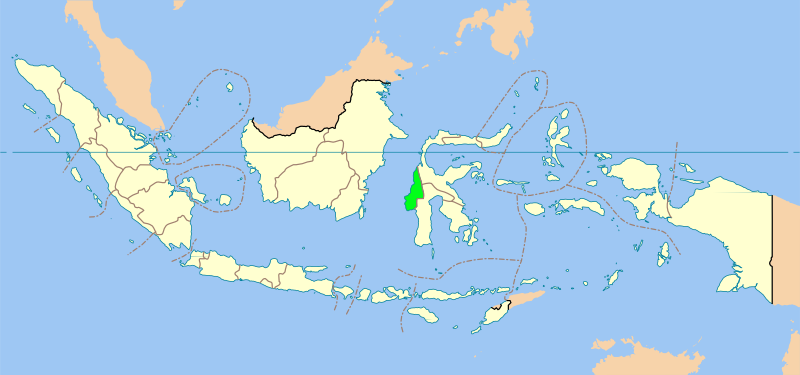
- West Sulawesi region in Indonesia

- Location of the airport in Sulawesi

Runways
Direction	Length		Surface
Direction	m	ft	Surface
05/23	2,240	7,349	Asphalt

Statistics (2024)
- Passengers: 42,178 (▼22.57%)
- Cargo (tonnes): 137.45 (▲267.02%)
- Aircraft movements: 616 (▼47.84%)
- Source: DGCA

Tampa Padang Airport (IATA: MJU, ICAO: WAFJ) is a domestic airport serving Mamuju, the capital and largest town of the province of West Sulawesi on the island of Sulawesi, Indonesia. The airport is located in Kalukki District, Mamuju Regency, approximately 30 km (18.6 miles) from Mamuju city center. As the only airport in West Sulawesi currently serving scheduled commercial flights, it serves as the province’s main gateway by air to Mamuju and the surrounding areas. Flight services to the airport are currently very limited, with only two routes connecting Mamuju to Makassar and Balikpapan, both operated exclusively by Wings Air. The airport was previously served by other airlines, including Batik Air, Citilink, and Garuda Indonesia, but all have since discontinued their services to Mamuju.

== History ==
=== Construction and early history ===
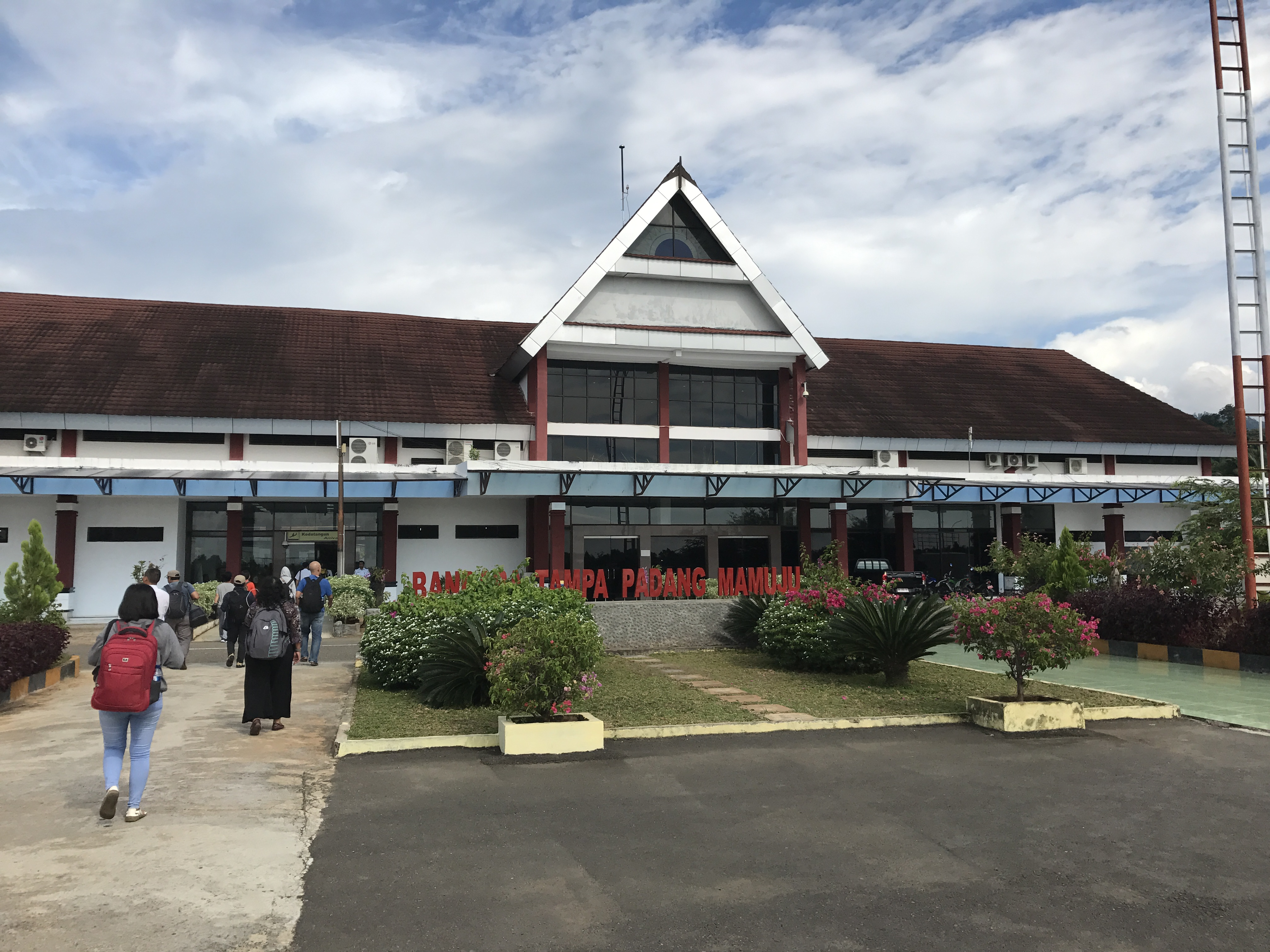
Former terminal of Tampa Padang Airport, prior to its relocation in 2023

During the early decades of the 1960s and 1970s, the people of Mamuju and the surrounding areas were relatively isolated due to the lack of adequate infrastructure. The region’s mountainous terrain made it particularly difficult to access, resulting in very low levels of mobility. At the time, the only reasonably accessible means of transportation was by sea. However, maritime transport was also difficult to access for communities north of Mamuju, while road infrastructure both within the city and in the surrounding areas remained limited and in poor condition. To address the region’s isolation, a pioneer airfield was constructed to improve access to Mamuju and the surrounding areas, which at the time were still part of South Sulawesi Province. Strategically located to serve communities in and around Mamuju, the new airfield was intended to provide an alternative means of transportation, improve regional mobility, and promote economic growth and social development. The construction of the new airport cost approximately 35.3 million rupiah at the time.

Tampa Padang Airport was inaugurated on 14 June 1979 by Air Marshal Kardono, the head of the Directorate General of Civil Aviation, on behalf of the Minister of Transportation, Emil Salim. At the time, the airport had a single 710-metre-long and 19-metre-wide runway, which remained unpaved and surfaced with grass. The airport’s initial operations were marked by the arrival of a de Havilland Canada DHC-6 Twin Otter operated by Merpati Nusantara Airlines, with a capacity of 18 passengers. Scheduled services continued for several years, supported in particular by the rapidly growing timber industry in Mamuju at the time. Timber entrepreneurs were among the airport’s most frequent users, alongside local residents who relied on air transport as an alternative means of transportation. Regular flights operated daily and continued until around 1982. However, irregular and charter flights continued to operate, primarily serving visits by government officials, regional dignitaries, and private-sector representatives.

Regular scheduled services resumed around 1987, with Merpati reintroducing flights between Mamuju and Makassar, the provincial capital of South Sulawesi. However, services remained irregular and were not operated on a consistent schedule. At the time, the airport’s facilities were still very basic. There was no dedicated passenger or cargo terminal, while essential facilities such as aircraft rescue and firefighting services (PKP-PK) were also unavailable. The only building on the airport grounds was a small office building, which served as both the administrative center and the facility for passenger processing and airport operations.

=== Contemporary history ===
As demand for air transportation increased and efforts were made to improve airport services, several important facilities were constructed in 1990, including a passenger terminal, an aircraft rescue and firefighting (PKP-PK) building, and other supporting infrastructure. These facilities became operational in the same year.

The increase in flight activity was closely associated with the gradual improvement of the airport’s facilities, as well as growing demand for fast and safe air transportation. The airport’s runway was progressively upgraded and extended over the following decades. In 1979, the runway was still an unpaved grass strip measuring 710 meters in length. It was subsequently paved and extended to 1,260 meters long and 23 meters wide. From 2007 to 2009, the runway was further extended to 1,500 meters, with its width increased to 30 meters.

During the COVID-19 pandemic in 2020, the airport was briefly closed to all commercial flights, with the exception of VIP operations, including presidential and military flights, as well as flights transporting logistical supplies and medical supplies.

The aircraft sustained minor damage during the West Sulawesi earthquake on 15 January 2021. The airport’s ATC tower and AirNav Indonesia’s Mamuju office also sustained minor damage, prompting the temporary relocation of AirNav Indonesia’s Mamuju unit to Makassar. It was not until 20 January that AirNav Indonesia brought a mobile control tower from Makassar to Mamuju to support air traffic navigation. Despite the damage, the airport remained fully operational and served as a temporary hub for aircraft delivering aid and relief supplies to earthquake victims across West Sulawesi.

In 2022, the West Sulawesi Provincial Government proposed renaming the airport Andi Depu Tampa Padang Airport, in honor of Andi Depu, a Mandarese revolutionary from present-day West Sulawesi who played a role in the Indonesian National Revolution and was later recognized as a national hero of Indonesia. The proposed name was subsequently approved by the provincial government and is awaiting approval from the Ministry of Transportation and the central government. However, the renaming proposal has faced some opposition, with some protesters demonstrating outside the West Sulawesi Regional House of Representatives (DPRD). They argued that Andi Depu, who was originally from present-day Polewali Mandar Regency, was not an appropriate figure to represent Mamuju. Instead, they proposed naming the airport after heroes with ties to Mamuju, such as Punggawa Malolo or Ahmad Kirang.

== Facilities and development ==
Major redevelopment of the airport began in 2015, involving the construction of a new terminal, the extension of the runway and apron, and the construction and upgrading of other airport facilities. Preparatory work began in 2014, when a total of 50 hectares of land was cleared. However, the development was plagued by numerous problems and delays, including a land dispute with the original landowners over compensation.

Following multiple delays, the new terminal commenced operations on 19 September 2023. The new terminal is located approximately 2 km (1.2 miles) from the old terminal and covers an area of 5,087 m². A total of IDR 112 million was invested in the construction of the new terminal and other supporting facilities on both the landside and airside. The terminal is equipped with a comprehensive range of facilities, including escalators, elevators, check-in counters, passenger waiting areas, baggage claim conveyors, and a BRI ATM. Following the opening of the new terminal, the original master plan called for the old terminal to be converted into a VIP terminal for high-ranking dignitaries. However, there have also been proposals to convert the old terminal into a pilot training school.

As part of the development, the runway was subsequently extended and widened in 2023 to 2,240 × 45 m, with a total built length of 2,500 m. Its pavement strength has also been progressively upgraded to accommodate larger and heavier aircraft. Following the upgrade, the largest aircraft currently capable of operating at Tampa Padang Airport are narrow-body types such as the Boeing 737 and Airbus A320. The airport also developed two 75-meter-long and 18-meter-wide taxiways, as well as an apron measuring 180 meters by 40 meters, which can accommodate two ATR 72s and two Boeing 737s.

== Airlines and destinations ==
Airlines	Destinations
Wings Air	Balikpapan, Makassar

== Statistics ==
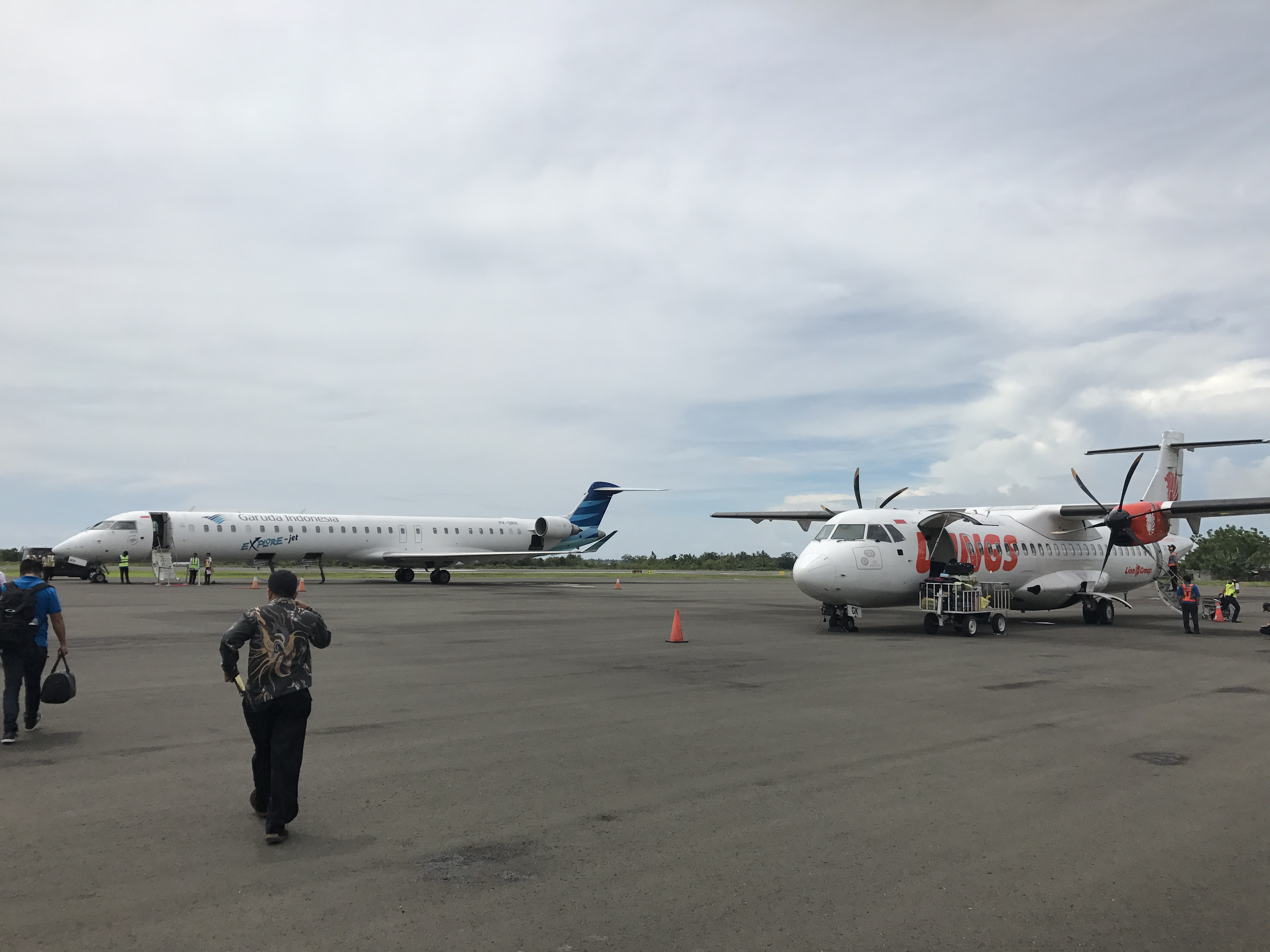
A Garuda Indonesia Bombardier CRJ1000 and a Wings Air ATR 72-500 at Tampa Padang Airport. Wings Air is currently the sole airline operating at the airport

Annual passenger numbers and aircraft statistics
Year	Passengers handled	Passenger % change	Cargo (tonnes)	Cargo % change	Aircraft movements	Aircraft % change
2006	N/A	Steady	0.4	Steady	534	Steady
2007	5,878	Steady	N/A	Steady	398	▼25.47
2008	15,027	▲155.65	N/A	Steady	604	▲51.76
2009	15,539	▲3.41	N/A	Steady	710	▲17.55
2010	38,077	▲145.04	N/A	Steady	1,104	▲55.49
2011	48,478	▲27.32	20.89	▼97.18	1,078	▼2.36
2012	53,524	▲10.41	0.59	Steady	1,226	▲13.73
2013	44,417	▼17.01	N/A	Steady	906	▼26.10
2014	42,524	▼4.26	N/A	Steady	879	▼2.98
2015	82,135	▲93.15	5.85	Steady	1,971	▲124.23
2016	123,145	▲49.93	N/A	Steady	2,240	▲13.65
2017	172,868	▲40.38	N/A	Steady	2,994	▲33.66
2018	174,441	▲0.91	83.92	Steady	3,350	▲11.89
2019	131,684	▼24.51	25.53	▼69.58	2,600	▼22.39
2020	53,617	▼59.28	29.19	▲14.34	1,338	▼48.54
2021	42,772	▼20.23	170.53	▲484.21	1,672	▲24.96
2022	51,463	▲20.32	51.83	▼69.61	1,304	▼22.01
2023	54,473	▲5.85	37.45	▼27.74	1,181	▼9.43
2024	42,178	▼22.57	137.45	▲267.02	616	▼47.84
^{Source: DGCA, BPS}
