= PS Sandeq =

Indonesian football club

- Full name: Persatuan Sepakbola Sandeq
- Nickname: Tim Sandeq (The Sandeq Team)
- Founded: 1960; 66 years ago; as PS Polmas
- Ground: Salim Mengga Stadium; Polewali Mandar, West Sulawesi
- Capacity: 3,000
- Owner: PSSI Polewali Mandar
- Manager: Irham Nasaruddin
- Coach: Ahmad Sukri
- League: Liga 4
- 2024–25: 1st (West Sulawesi Round); First round, 3rd in Group C (National phase)
Home colours	Away colours

Persatuan Sepakbola Sandeq (previously known as PS Polmas) is an Indonesian football club based in Polewali Mandar, West Sulawesi. They currently competes in Liga 4.

== History ==
Founded in 1960 as Persatuan Sepakbola Polewali Mamasa (simply known as PS Polmas), they represent the Polewali Mamasa Regency, which is currently divided into two separate regencies: Polewali Mandar and Mamasa.

The club played its first professional competition in the 1994–95 Liga Indonesia Second Division, following the merger of two previous Indonesian football competitions, Perserikatan and Galatama. In their first season, they were eliminated in the first stage after finishing third in Group B.

== Honours ==
- Liga 3 West Sulawesi
  - Champions (2): 2019, 2021
  - Runner-up (1): 2023
- Liga 4 West Sulawesi
  - Champions (1): 2024–25
- Habibie Cup
  - Champions (4): 1994, 1998, 2000, 2007
