= Pespa Pasangkayu =

Association football team in Indonesia

- Full name: Persatuan Sepakbola Pasangkayu
- Nickname: Pasukan Boenjamata
- Founded: 1956; 70 years ago
- Ground: Gelora Djiwa Stadium; Pasangkayu Regency, West Sulawesi
- Capacity: 1,000
- Owner: Askab PSSI Pasangkayu
- Coach: Akmal
- League: Liga 4
- 2021: 5th in Group A, (West Sulawesi zone)
Home colours	Away colours

Persatuan Sepakbola Pasangkayu (simply known as Pespa Pasangkayu) is an Indonesian football club based in Pasangkayu Regency, West Sulawesi. They currently compete in the Liga 4.
