= Sampaga =

- Location in West Sulawesi and Indonesia Sampaga (Indonesia)
- Coordinates: 2°18′24.8976″S 119°8′46.6152″E
- Country: Indonesia
- Province: West Sulawesi
- Regency: Mamuju Regency
- District: Sampaga District
- Elevation: 13 ft (4 m)

Population (2010)
  - Total: 1,371
- Time zone: UTC+8 (Indonesia Central Standard Time)

Sampaga is a village in Sampaga district, Mamuju Regency in West Sulawesi province. The district covers an area of 110.27 km^{2} and had a population of 15,925 at the 2020 Census.

== Climate ==
Sampaga has a tropical rainforest climate (Af) with heavy rainfall year-round.

Climate data for Sampaga
Month	Jan	Feb	Mar	Apr	May	Jun	Jul	Aug	Sep	Oct	Nov	Dec	Year
Mean daily maximum °C (°F)	30.3 (86.5)	30.4 (86.7)	30.6 (87.1)	30.9 (87.6)	31.1 (88.0)	30.4 (86.7)	29.8 (85.6)	30.8 (87.4)	31.0 (87.8)	32.0 (89.6)	31.3 (88.3)	30.7 (87.3)	30.8 (87.4)
Daily mean °C (°F)	26.8 (80.2)	26.8 (80.2)	26.9 (80.4)	27.2 (81.0)	27.5 (81.5)	26.8 (80.2)	25.9 (78.6)	26.6 (79.9)	26.7 (80.1)	27.7 (81.9)	27.4 (81.3)	27.1 (80.8)	27.0 (80.5)
Mean daily minimum °C (°F)	23.3 (73.9)	23.3 (73.9)	23.3 (73.9)	23.5 (74.3)	23.9 (75.0)	23.2 (73.8)	22.1 (71.8)	22.5 (72.5)	22.5 (72.5)	23.4 (74.1)	23.5 (74.3)	23.5 (74.3)	23.2 (73.7)
Average precipitation mm (inches)	229 (9.0)	216 (8.5)	247 (9.7)	251 (9.9)	288 (11.3)	261 (10.3)	175 (6.9)	196 (7.7)	192 (7.6)	181 (7.1)	250 (9.8)	209 (8.2)	2,695 (106)
Source: Climate-Data.org
