= Polewali =

Coordinates: 3°25′12″S 119°21′00″E

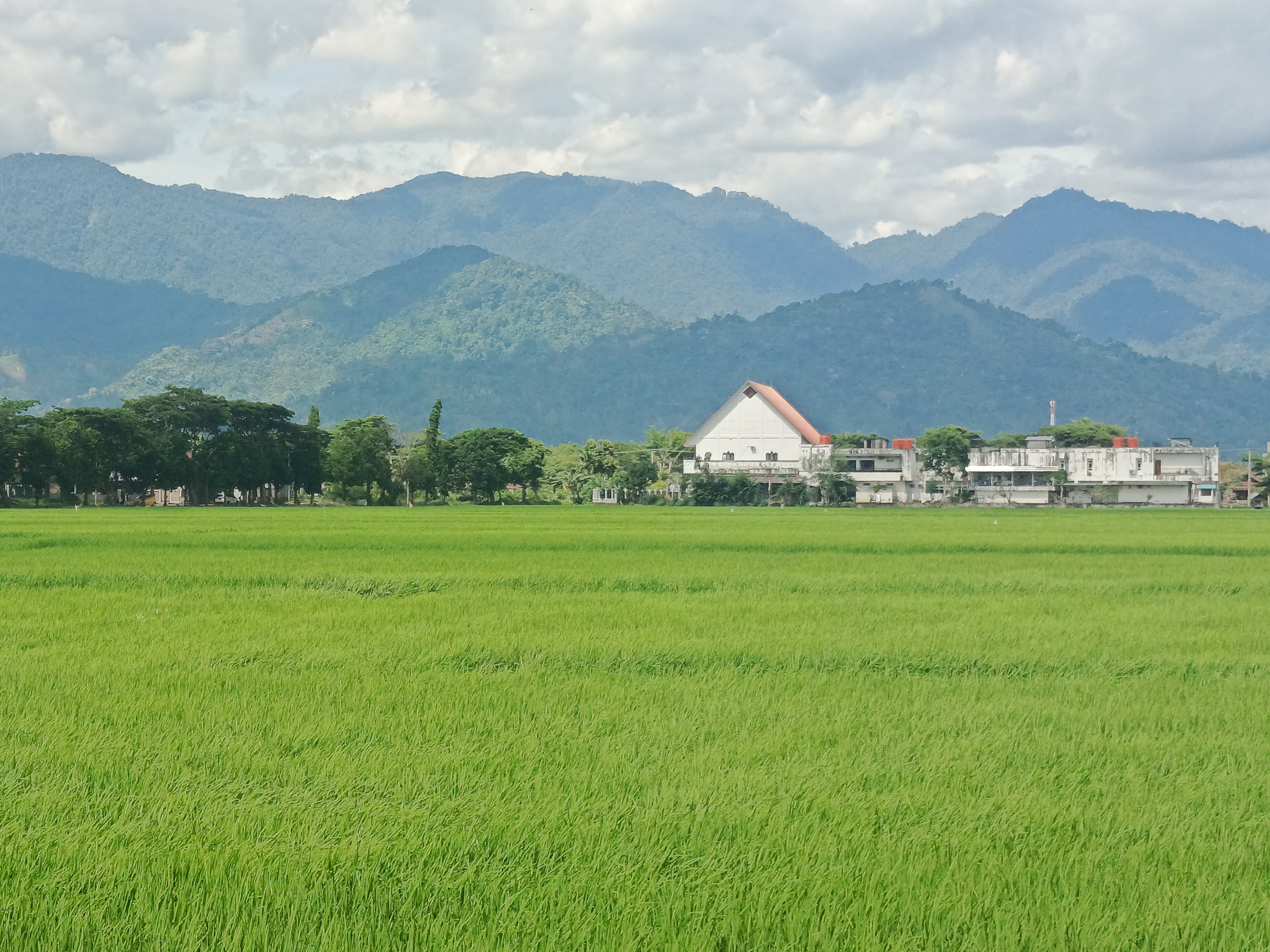
- Paddy field in Polewali
- Interactive map of Polewali
- Country: Indonesia
- Province: West Sulawesi
- Regency: Polewali Mandar

Population
  - Total: 67,745

Polewali is the capital of the Polewali Mandar Regency of West Sulawesi, Indonesia.

It is a large seaside town on the coast of the Mandar Gulf. Polewali is the largest town in the province of West Sulawesi with 54,843 inhabitants at the 2010 Census and 65,800 at the 2020 Census; the official estimate as of mid 2024 was 67,745 (making it slightly larger than the town of Mamuju).

== Climate ==
Polewali has a tropical rainforest climate (Af) with moderate rainfall from July to September and heavy rainfall in the remaining months.

Climate data for Polewali
Month	Jan	Feb	Mar	Apr	May	Jun	Jul	Aug	Sep	Oct	Nov	Dec	Year
Mean daily maximum °C (°F)	30.0 (86.0)	30.2 (86.4)	30.5 (86.9)	30.9 (87.6)	31.1 (88.0)	30.4 (86.7)	30.2 (86.4)	31.0 (87.8)	31.4 (88.5)	32.1 (89.8)	31.3 (88.3)	30.3 (86.5)	30.8 (87.4)
Daily mean °C (°F)	26.6 (79.9)	26.7 (80.1)	26.9 (80.4)	27.1 (80.8)	27.3 (81.1)	26.5 (79.7)	25.9 (78.6)	26.4 (79.5)	26.7 (80.1)	27.5 (81.5)	27.3 (81.1)	26.8 (80.2)	26.8 (80.3)
Mean daily minimum °C (°F)	23.2 (73.8)	23.3 (73.9)	23.3 (73.9)	23.3 (73.9)	23.5 (74.3)	22.7 (72.9)	21.7 (71.1)	21.8 (71.2)	22.0 (71.6)	22.9 (73.2)	23.3 (73.9)	23.3 (73.9)	22.9 (73.1)
Average rainfall mm (inches)	289 (11.4)	187 (7.4)	186 (7.3)	242 (9.5)	209 (8.2)	156 (6.1)	104 (4.1)	96 (3.8)	121 (4.8)	149 (5.9)	207 (8.1)	254 (10.0)	2,200 (86.6)
Source: Climate-Data.org
