= Kalumpang, Indonesia =

Kalumpang is a district (kecamatan) in the Mamuju Regency of West Sulawesi, Indonesia. The population is composed of the Kalumpang people, most of whom rely solely on subsistence-level agriculture, especially the growing of rice, to survive.

The language spoken throughout Kalumpang is also called Kalumpang and is similar to that of the neighbouring area, Toraja.

Kalumpang has undergone minimal development, for example electricity is obtained from single motor generators which are of poor quality. However, the Government provides the area with a satellite feed so they may obtain Nationalist News. Infrastructure is quite under-developed and it is difficult to travel between villages during the wet season. Jeeps, motorbikes, out-rigger canoes, rafts and walking are used as modes of transport.

== Religion ==
Kalumpang is predominantly Christian, with few Muslims in the area. There are no mosques in the region, which causes some tension between Christians and Muslims. The main village in the Kalumpang region is also called Kalumpang, with other villages such as Tambing-Tambing, Buttu, Batuisi, Hinua and Pambentengan mostly lying close to the river, in order to irrigate the rice fields.

== Health care ==
The only health care available is a Puskemas (public health centre) in the main village, Kalumpang. In outlying regions, health problems and disease pose a great mortality threat.

== Education ==
In Tambing-Tambing and in the main village Kalumpang, education extends to SMP (III), which is equivalent to the 9th Grade in Western Systems. To obtain higher education, students must travel to Mamuju and pay hefty tuition fees. It is impossible for most villagers to pay as the primary form of living is subsistence agriculture. Thus there is minimal opportunity for students to receive higher education.

== Archaeology ==
The Kalumpang archaeological site is one of the two oldest Neolithic sites in Indonesia which preserves the long history of the Austronesian civilization, which became the forerunner for most of the ancestors of most of the Indonesians. Archaeological evidence at this site shows that Austronesian people have long lived there and developed their culture, similar to the Neolithic culture of Taiwan and the Lapita culture in Oceania.
