= Sandeq =

Traditional fishing boat from Indonesia

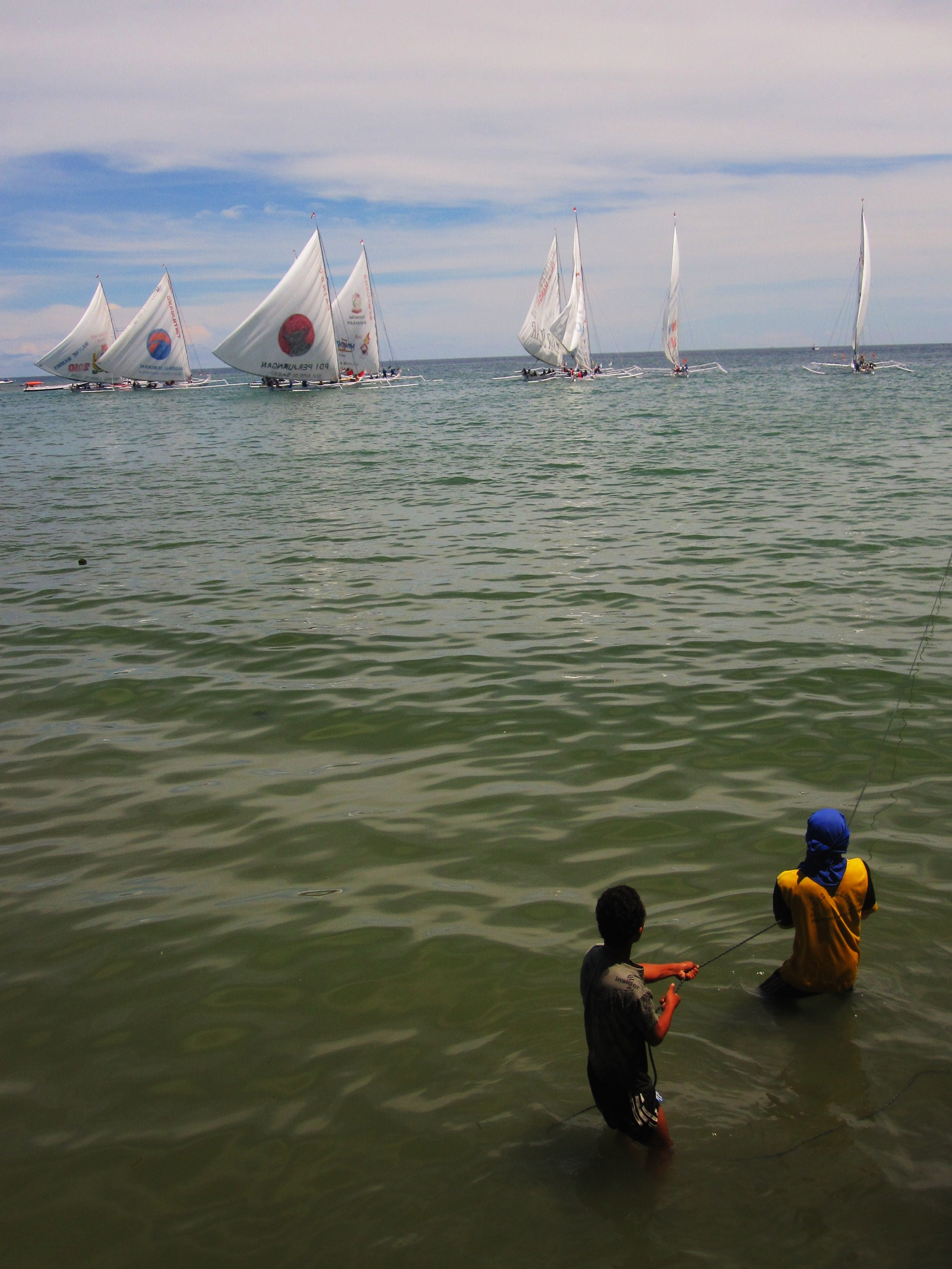
Sandeq in Majene

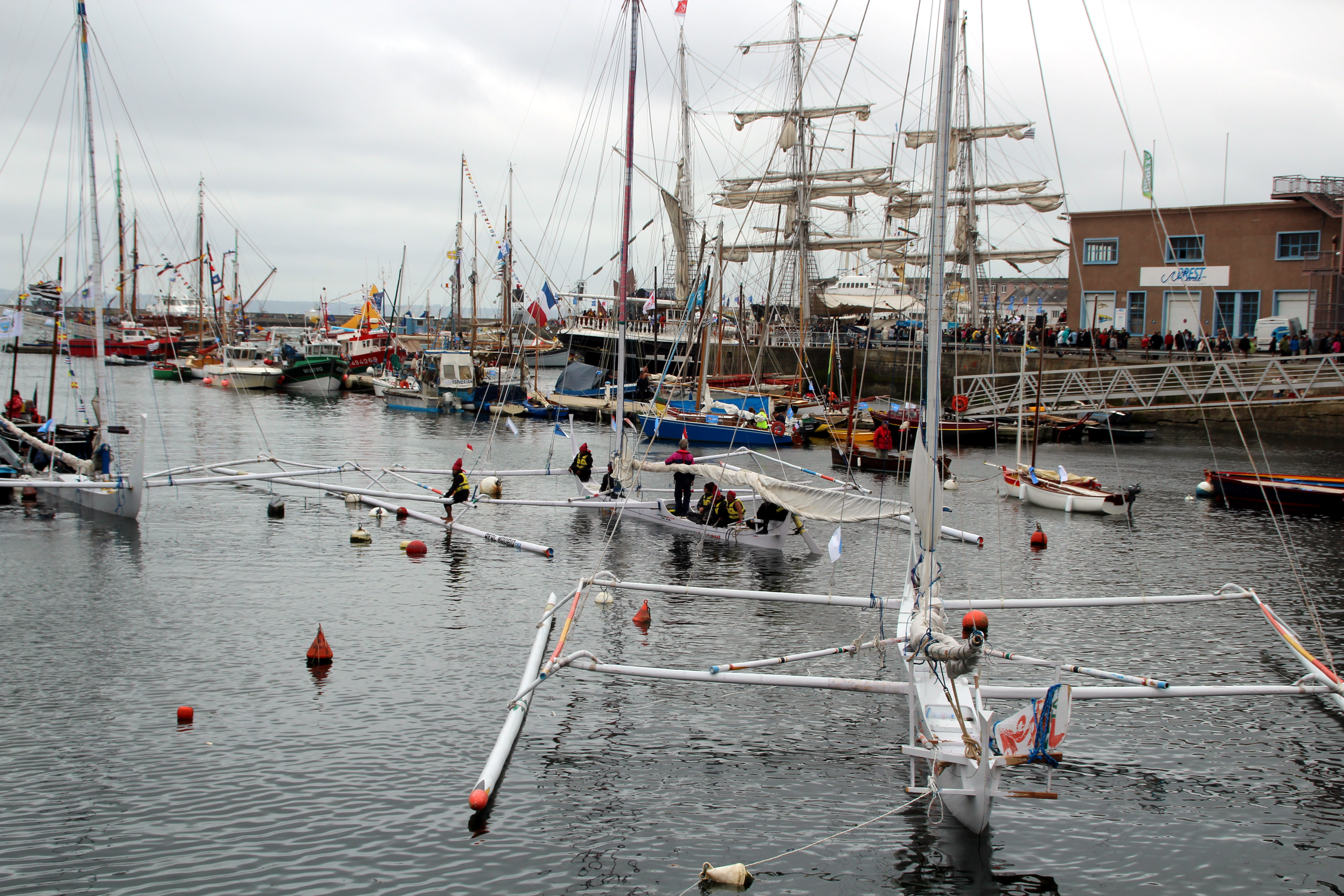
Sandeq in Brest

A Sandeq is a type of outrigger sailboat or trimaran used by the Mandarese people for fishing and as a means of transportation between islands. The size of Sandeq varies, with hulls ranging from 5 to 15 metres (16 to 49 ft) long and 0.5 to 1.5 metres (1 ft 8 in to 4 ft 11 in) wide. Its carrying capacity ranges from a few hundred kilograms to over 2 tons. The sleek shape of the Sandeq makes it more agile and faster than other sailboats. The name of the vessel comes from a word in the Mandar language that means pointy, referring to the bow's shape.

This boat is a well-known piece of maritime cultural heritage to the Mandarese people in West Sulawesi, Indonesia. Before the use of outboard motors, the Sandeq was one of the dominant means travelling between islands of the archipelago, not only because of its smoothness and speed, but also thanks to its ability to sail close-hauled almost directly against the direction of the wind. The zig-zag technique called beating in English is called Makkarakkayi in the Mandar language. Although Mandarese seafarers have developed many types of boats, both big and small, the Sandeq is the only fully wind-powered vessel that is still commonly used in West Sulawesi today.

The two smaller outrigger hulls serve to balance the vessel, which relies on the wind force captured by the triangular sail. The Sandeq can reach speeds of up to 15 to 20 knots (28 to 37 km/h; 17 to 23 mph).

A Sandeq is also able to survive the wind and waves while chasing a herd of tuna. During the fishing season, skippers use Sandeq to trap eggs from a series of coconut leaves and seaweed. The Sandeq can also be used to collect spices from Ternate and Tidore to be delivered to the city of Makassar.

Every year, a Sandeq race is held in mid-August. The route from Mamuju, West Sulawesi to Makassar, South Sulawesi covers a distance of 300 nautical miles (560 km; 350 mi).

== Type of Sandeq ==
- Sandeq pangoli: Used to catch fish near the reef edge and in the region where currents meet by dragging lure made of chicken feathers behind the boat (mangoli). This type of boat is very fast and agile and able to reverse its course quickly in order to hunt fish and not hit by coral.
- Sandeq parroppo: Used for fishing in rappo/rumpon (FAD) in the open sea; this type of boat is big enough so that (1) it can load two or three canoes that will be unloaded in rumpon to expand the catching area, (2) sailors can carry shipping supplies that last for two to five days, (3) the boat can withstand big waves and strong winds in the open sea.
- Sandeq potangnga: Used to sail the high seas to catch fish and searching for flying fish and their eggs. The type of boat is large in order to be able to load provisions and equipment needed in navigating the ocean for two or three weeks, especially sufficient salt to conserve the fish. In order that the high waves that are usually found in fishing areas will not have the chance to disturb and wet the anglers, this type of sandeq often had additional platform that are higher than the hull deck of the boat, mounted at the left and right side, behind the mast.

== See also ==
- Kora kora
- Balangay
- Lepa (ship)
- Paduwang
- Bago
