= PS Matra =

Association football team in Indonesia

- Full name: Persatuan Sepakbola Mamuju Utara
- Nickname: Brigade Vovasanggayu
- Founded: 2004; 22 years ago
- Ground: Gelora Djiwa Stadium; Pasangkayu, West Sulawesi
- Capacity: 1,000
- Owner: Askab PSSI Pasangkayu
- Coach: Muhammad Rusli
- League: Liga 4
- 2025–26: 3rd in Group B, (West Sulawesi zone)
Home colours	Away colours

Persatuan Sepakbola Mamuju Utara (simply known as PS Matra) is an Indonesian football club based in Pasangkayu, West Sulawesi. They currently compete in the Liga 4.

== Honours ==
- Liga 3 West Sulawesi
  - Champion (1): 2017
  - Runner-up (1): 2016
