= OTP37 F.C. =

Indonesian association football team

OTP37
- Full name: One Team Pride 37 Football Club
- Nickname: The Wild Maleo
- Founded: 2015; 11 years ago
- Ground: Manakarra Stadium; Mamuju, West Sulawesi
- Capacity: 5,000
- Coach: Herman Bahri
- League: Liga 4
- 2021: 2nd, (Liga 3 West Sulawesi zone)
Home colours

One Team Pride 37 Football Club, commonly known as OTP37, is an Indonesian football club based in Mamuju, West Sulawesi. They are currently compete in Liga 4 and their homebase is Manakarra Stadium.

== Honours ==
- Liga 3 West Sulawesi
  - Champion (1): 2018
  - Runner-up (1): 2021
