= Balabalagan Islands =

Indonesian island group in the Makassar Strait

Coordinates: 2°31′20″S 117°56′10″E

Balabalagan Islands (also spelled Bala-balakang and historically known as Little Paternoster Islands) are an Indonesian archipelago forming an administrative district of Mamuju Regency located in the Makassar Strait off the east coast of Kalimantan (Borneo), between it and Sulawesi and closer to the former island. The archipelago is also located near the geographic center of Indonesia.

In the 19th century, the islands were recorded as numbering 14, with the largest named Sebunkatang; the channels were shallow and unnavigable, but provided a fertile fishing ground for the island natives, called Biajoo. The islands rest on a coral reef, itself placed on an undersea bank which extends out from Kalimantan, presenting a major hazard to navigation; the Admiralty Pilot has warned that "No vessel should venture among [them] without local knowledge." The islands cover a land area of only 5.31 km^{2} and had a population of 2,201 at the 2020 Census. The official estimate as at mid 2024 was 2,242.

== See also ==
- Geography of Sulawesi
- Geography of Indonesia
