= Mandarese people =

Indonesian ethnic group

Mandarese Mandar people ᨔᨘᨀᨘ ᨆᨊᨛᨉᨑᨛ سوكو ماندار
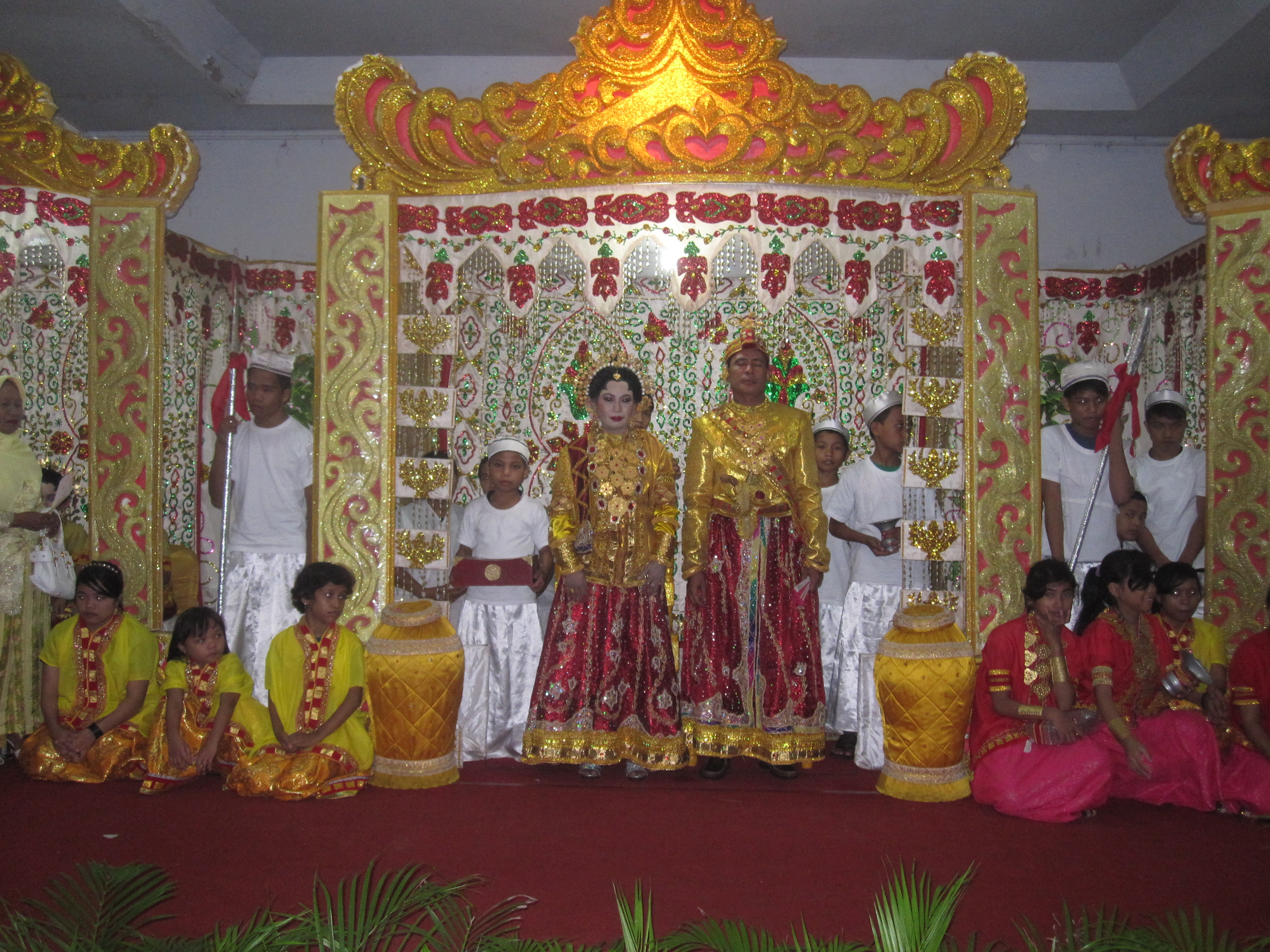
- Traditional Mandar Wedding at Mandar, West Sulawesi, 2011.

Total population
- Approximately 1 million

Regions with significant populations
- Indonesia
- West Sulawesi: 565,225
- South Sulawesi: 489,986
- South Kalimantan: 49,322
- East Kalimantan: 33,000

Languages
- Mandar, Mamasa, Mamuju, Indonesian

Religion
- 95% Islam, 5% Christianity

Related ethnic groups
- Austronesian peoples; Buginese; Makassarese; Kangeanese; Toraja

The Mandarese are an Austronesian ethnic group native to province of West Sulawesi. The Mandar language belongs to the Northern subgroup of the South Sulawesi languages group of the Malayo-Polynesian branch of the Austronesian language family. The closest language to Mandar is the Toraja-Sa'dan language.

== Identity ==
Before there was a regional expansion, the Mandarese along with the Bugis people, Makassar people and Toraja people formed a cultural diversity in South Sulawesi. Although politically West Sulawesi and South Sulawesi are divided by a border, the Mandarese are historically and culturally close knitted to their cognate relatives in South Sulawesi. The term "Mandar" is actually a unified name among the seven coastal kingdoms (Pitu Ba'ba'na Binanga) and seven river kingdoms (Pitu Ulunna Salu). In terms of ethnicity, the Pitu Ulunna Salu or commonly known as Kondo Sapata are classified as a part of the Toraja group (Mamasa Regency and part of Mamuju Regency), while at Pitu Ba'ba'na Binanga itself there are a variety of dialects and languages. The strength of these fourteen kingdoms complement each other and the term Sipamandar (meaning, brotherhood and unification of the Mandarese community) as one people through a covenant that was sworn by their ancestors at Allewuang Batu in Luyo.

== History ==
The Mandarese are made up of seventeen kingdoms. Seven upstream kingdoms which are called Pitu Ulunna Salu, seven estuary kingdoms that are known as Pitu Ba'bana Binanga and three kingdoms that are called Kakarunna Tiparittiqna Uhai.

The seven kingdoms that merged in the Pitu Ulunna Salu Alliance region are:

- Rante Bulahang Kingdom
- Aralle Kingdom
- Tabulahang Kingdom
- Mambi Kingdom
- Matangnga Kingdom
- Tabang Kingdom
- Bambang Kingdom

The seven kingdoms that merged in the Pitu Baqbana Binanga Alliance region are:

- Balanipa Kingdom
- Sendana Kingdom
- Banggae Kingdom
- Pamboang Kingdom
- Tapalang Kingdom
- Mamuju Kingdom
- Benuang Kingdom

The three kingdoms that called Kakaruanna Tiparittiqna Uhai in the Lembang Mapi region are:

- Alu Kingdom
- Tuqbi Kingdom
- Taramanuq Kingdom

The upstream kingdoms are well versed with the conditions of the mountains while the estuary kingdoms are experienced with the conditions of the ocean. With the boundaries on the south which borders Pinrang Regency, South Sulawesi, on the eastern side borders with Tana Toraja Regency, South Sulawesi, on the north part borders with Palu, Central Sulawesi, and on the west coast border is Straits of Makassar.

Throughout the history of Mandar kingdoms, many notable freedom fighters arose against the Dutch East Indies such as Imaga Daeng Rioso, Puatta I Sa'adawang, Maradia Banggae, Ammana Iwewang, Andi Depu, Mara'dia Batulaya and so forth, although later regions occupied by the Mandarese was successfully captured by the Dutch East Indies. From the zeal of the Mandarese which is referred as "the spirit of Assimandarang" until later in 2004 the Mandar region became recognized as a province in Indonesia as West Sulawesi.

== Social structure ==
The Mandarese people are dominated by the vestiges of traditional relations. Feudal nobility, including royal rulers of the past mara'dia (prince), participates with the administrative and governmental system.

However, the following interesting trend was observed in Mandarese society is that many women left their traditional work at the loom and began to engage in the fish trade instead.

== Culture ==
In Mandarese culture, they are quite similar to the Bugis people. They engage in fisheries by exporting dried, salted or fermented fish and also in agriculture by cultivating coconut palm, dried rice, coffee, tobacco, as well as forestry. It is believed that the Mandarese people are some of the best sailors in Sulawesi, who serve in the sea transportation sector.

A traditional musical instrument is a two-stringed lute. The traditional house of the Mandarese is called boyang. Customary festivals such as Sayyang Pattu'du (Dancing horse), and Passandeq (Sailing on an outrigger canoe) are practiced by the Mandarese. In South Pulau Laut District, Kota Baru Regency, the Mandarese practice the Mappando'esasi (Sea bathing) ceremony. Traditional food such as Jepa, Pandeangang Peapi, Banggulung Tapa and so on are Mandarese specialty.

The Mandarese are predominantly Muslim. The Mandarese adopted Islam in the early 17th century.
