= Mamuju (city) =

Capital district of West Sulawesi, Indonesia

- Town
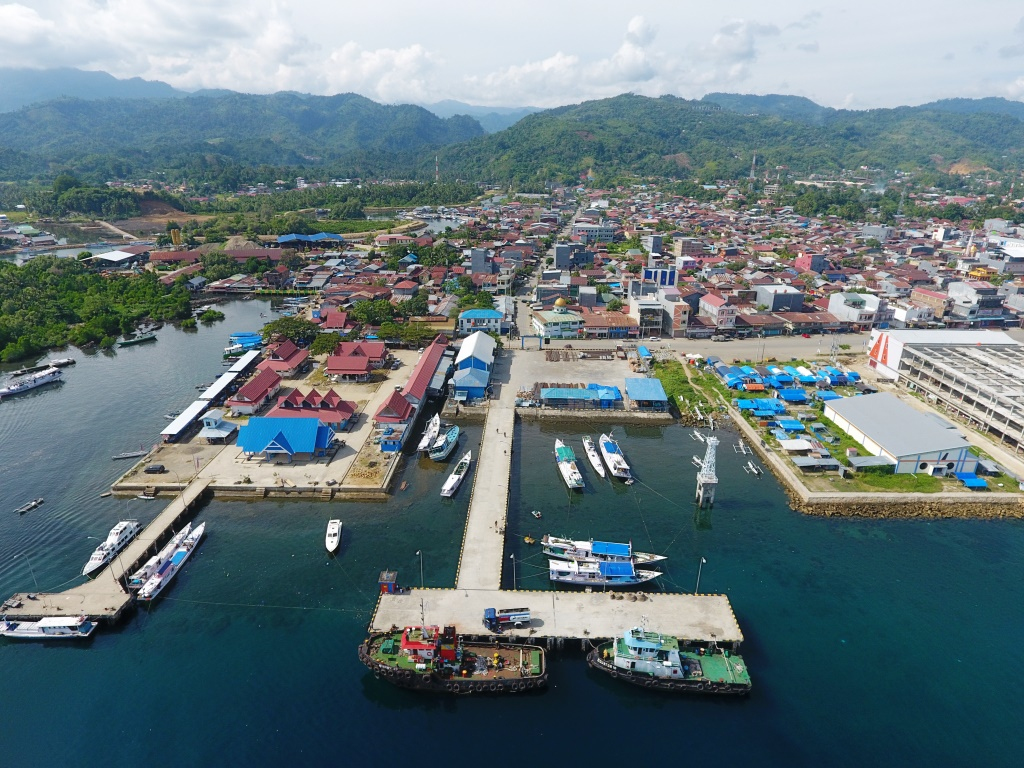
- Aerial view of the port of Mamuju
- Interactive map of Mamuju
- Location in Sulawesi and Indonesia Mamuju (Indonesia)
- Coordinates: 2°40′07″S 118°51′44″E
- Country: Indonesia
- Province: West Sulawesi
- Regency: Mamuju Regency
- Founded: 14 July 1540

Area
  - Total: 206.64 km^{2} (79.78 sq mi)
- Elevation: 390 m (1,280 ft)

Population (2010)
  - Total: 107,864
  - Density: 521.99/km^{2} (1,351.9/sq mi)
- Time zone: UTC+8 (Indonesia Central Time)
- Area code: (+62) 426

Mamuju is the capital of the Indonesian province of West Sulawesi. The town was formerly part of South Sulawesi province.

== Education ==
Education in Mamuju extends up to SMA class III (Year 12) and people from surrounding areas (especially the area of Kalumpang) will travel to Mamuju to further their education. Students who wish to pursue a tertiary education must travel to larger towns like Makassar.

== Agriculture ==
Agriculture in this area includes jackfruit, rambutan, durian, rice, and bananas.

== Demographics ==
Like many places in West Sulawesi, Mamuju is a predominantly Muslim town, with many mosques. However, Christianity has established a presence with several churches in this town, in addition to a small contingent of Buddhists.

== Climate ==
Mamuju has a tropical savanna climate (Köppen Aw), bordering upon a tropical monsoon climate (Am). Rainfall is less than most of Indonesia due to rain shadow effects from nearby mountains.

Climate data for Mamuju (Tampa Padang Airport) (1991–2020 normals, extremes 2005–2023)
Month	Jan	Feb	Mar	Apr	May	Jun	Jul	Aug	Sep	Oct	Nov	Dec	Year
Mean daily maximum °C (°F)	31.7 (89.1)	31.9 (89.4)	32.1 (89.8)	32.0 (89.6)	31.7 (89.1)	31.1 (88.0)	30.7 (87.3)	31.3 (88.3)	32.2 (90.0)	32.6 (90.7)	32.3 (90.1)	31.8 (89.2)	31.8 (89.2)
Daily mean °C (°F)	27.7 (81.9)	27.8 (82.0)	27.9 (82.2)	27.9 (82.2)	28.1 (82.6)	27.7 (81.9)	27.4 (81.3)	27.6 (81.7)	28.1 (82.6)	28.4 (83.1)	28.2 (82.8)	27.7 (81.9)	27.9 (82.2)
Mean daily minimum °C (°F)	24.4 (75.9)	24.4 (75.9)	24.6 (76.3)	24.9 (76.8)	25.3 (77.5)	25.0 (77.0)	24.7 (76.5)	24.7 (76.5)	24.7 (76.5)	25.0 (77.0)	25.0 (77.0)	24.6 (76.3)	24.8 (76.6)
Average rainfall mm (inches)	219.9 (8.66)	117.4 (4.62)	100.2 (3.94)	144.5 (5.69)	117.1 (4.61)	108.1 (4.26)	67.8 (2.67)	37.2 (1.46)	54.8 (2.16)	146.8 (5.78)	147.8 (5.82)	234.7 (9.24)	1,496.3 (58.91)
Average rainy days	12.9	9.6	9.6	9.6	9.4	9.5	5.9	3.7	4.7	10.6	11.0	13.4	109.9
Mean monthly sunshine hours	170.3	173.7	192.0	202.8	218.8	200.5	208.2	242.8	226.8	239.4	218.6	171.8	2,465.7
Source: Starlings Roost Weather

== Culture ==
An annual sandeq race takes place every August from Mamuju to Makassar.

== Twin towns – sister cities ==
Mamuju is twinned with:

- Gorontalo City, Gorontalo, Indonesia
- Soweto, Gauteng, South Africa
