= Polewali Mandar Regency =

Regency in West Sulawesi, Indonesia

Coordinates: 3°24′48″S 119°19′30″E

- Regency
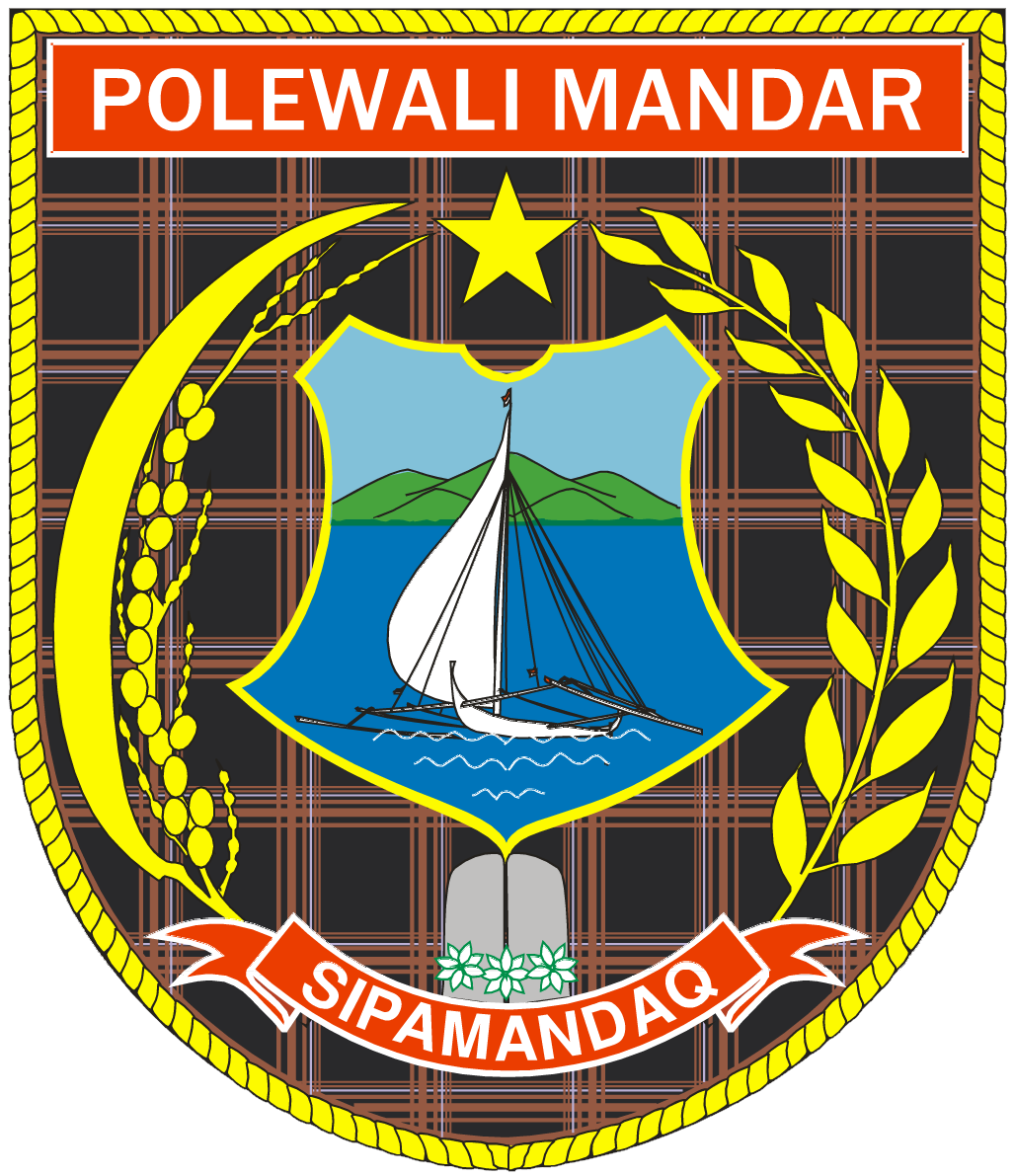
- Coat of arms
- Motto(s): Sipamandaq (Strengthening Each Other)
- Country: Indonesia
- Province: West Sulawesi
- Capital: Polewali

Government
  - Regent: Samsul Mahmud
  - Vice Regent: Andi Nursami Masdar

Area
  - Total: 2,075.27 km^{2} (801.27 sq mi)

Population (mid 2025 estimate)
  - Total: 497,007
  - Density: 239.490/km^{2} (620.277/sq mi)
- Time zone: UTC+8
- Website: polmankab.go.id

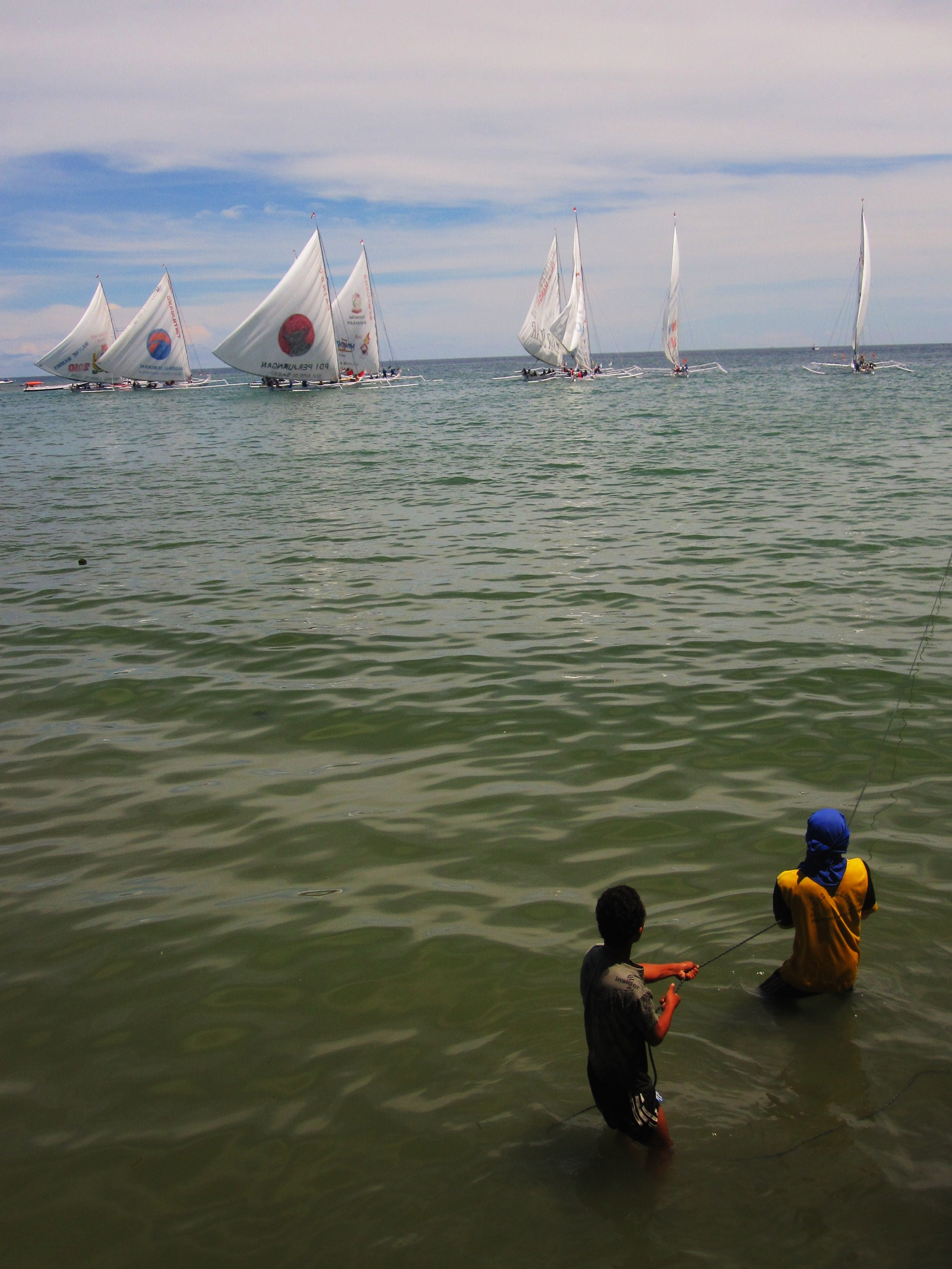
Sandeq boats in Majene

Polewali Mandar is one of the six regencies in West Sulawesi province of Indonesia. It borders on the regencies of Mamasa in the North, Majene in the West and Pinrang regency of South Sulawesi in the East. It covers an area of 2,075.27 km^{2} and had a population of 396,120 at the 2010 Census and 478,534 at the 2020 Census; the official estimate as at mid 2025 was 497,007 (comprising 248,599 males and 248,408 females). The regency is inhabited by various ethnic groups such as the Mandar, Buginese, Javanese and Toraja.

Mandar is an indigenous ethnic group forming the majority of the population. There are several national public figures originated from this region. The most famous one is the legendary Attorney General Baharuddin Lopa. The current provincial governor, Ali Baal Masdar, is the former regent of the region.

The capital town is Polewali, located in the south on the coast of the Gulf of Mandar and about 200 km (120 mi) away from the capital town of West Sulawesi, Mamuju, and 250 km (160 mi) away from Makassar, the capital city of South Sulawesi.

This regency is considered quite fertile with large enough paddy farm as well as plantation for chocolate and coconut plants. The regency covers both coast-line and mountain areas.

Polewali Mandar is also known as the origin of prau sandeq, a boat propelled especially by sails or paddles.

== History ==
Polewali Mandar Regency was formerly an Indonesian Regency that used to be part of South Sulawesi, but on 22 September 2004 became part of the new West Sulawesi province. Prior to this, on 14 April 2002, the regency was split into two: a residual Polewali Mandar Regency which is located to the south (including the coastal area), and a new Mamasa Regency to the north comprising the mountainous inland area. Polewali Mandar is mainly inhabited by the Mandar ethnic group, while Mamasa is home to the Mamasa people, who are related to the ethnic group Mamasa.

== Administration ==
The regency is divided into sixteen districts (kecamatan), tabulated below with their areas and their populations at the 2010 Census and the 2020 Census, together with the official estimates as at mid 2025. It is divided for convenience into two geographical sectors - west and east - which have no administrative role. The table also includes the locations of the district administrative centres, the numbers of villages in each district (totaling 144 rural desa and 23 urban kelurahan), and its post code.

Kode Wilayah	Name of District (kecamatan)	Area in km^{2}	Pop'n Census 2010	Pop'n Census 2020	Pop'n Estimate mid 2025	Admin centre	No. of villages	Post code
76.04.01	Tinambung	22.12	22,317	24,801	25,332	Batulaya	8 ^{(a)}	91356
76.04.12	Balanipa	32.98	24,021	29,120	30,148	Balanipa	11 ^{(a)}	91354
76.04.11	Limboro	69.47	16,981	19,358	19,412	Limboro	11 ^{(a)}	91321
76.04.05	Tubbi Taramanu (or "Tutar")	436.00	18,273	23,161	23,994	Taramanu	13 ^{(a)}	91355
76.04.15	Allu	164.15	11,980	14,686	15,195	Petoosang	8 ^{(a)}	91325
76.04.02	Campalagian	114.52	52,307	63,930	65,885	Parappe	18 ^{(b)}	91357
76.04.10	Luyo	123.82	26,692	32,759	34,327	Mambu	11 ^{(c)}	91358
Sub-totals	Western sector	963.06	172,571	207,815	214,293	Polewali	90	
76.04.03	Wonomulyo	76.84	45,269	51,363	53,194	Sidodadi	14 ^{(a)}	91342
76.04.08	Mapilli	102.75	27,220	33,540	34,917	Mapilli	12 ^{(a)}	91359
76.04.07	Tapango	129.39	21,492	25,703	27,110	Tapango	14 ^{(a)}	91341
76.04.14	Matakali	72.61	21,310	27,511	29,240	Matakali	7 ^{(a)}	91352
76.04.16	Bulo	228.91	8,633	10,457	11,200	Bulo	9	91353
76.04.04	Polewali	32.38	54,843	65,800	68,095	Pekkabata	9 ^{(d)}	91311, 91313 - 91315
76.04.06	Binuang ^{(e)}	145.89	30,504	39,326	40,870	Amassangan	10 ^{(a)}	91312 ^{(f)}
76.04.13	Anreapi	89.04	9,273	11,184	11,957	Anreapi	5 ^{(a)}	91315
76.04.09	Matangnga	234.40	5,005	5,835	6,131	Matangnga	7 ^{(a)}	91350
Sub-totals	Eastern sector	1,112.21	223,549	270,719	282,714	Polewali	87	
	Totals	2,075.27	396,120	478,534	497,007	Polewali	167	

Notes: (a) including one kelurahan - the district admin centre as named. (b) including one kelurahan - Pappang. (c) including one kelurahan - Batupanga.
(d) all kelurahan (Darma, Lantora, Madate, Manding, Pekkabata, Polewali, Sulewatang, Takatidung and Wattang).
(e) including 8 offshore islands in the Gulf of Mandar. (f) except the desa of Mammi (with a post code of 91311) and the desa of Kuajang and Paku (with a post code of 91351).

== See also ==
Polewali-Mamasa
