= Majene Regency =

Regency in West Sulawesi, Indonesia

Coordinates: 1.3181°S 119.3751°E

Majene Regency Kabupaten Majene
- Regency
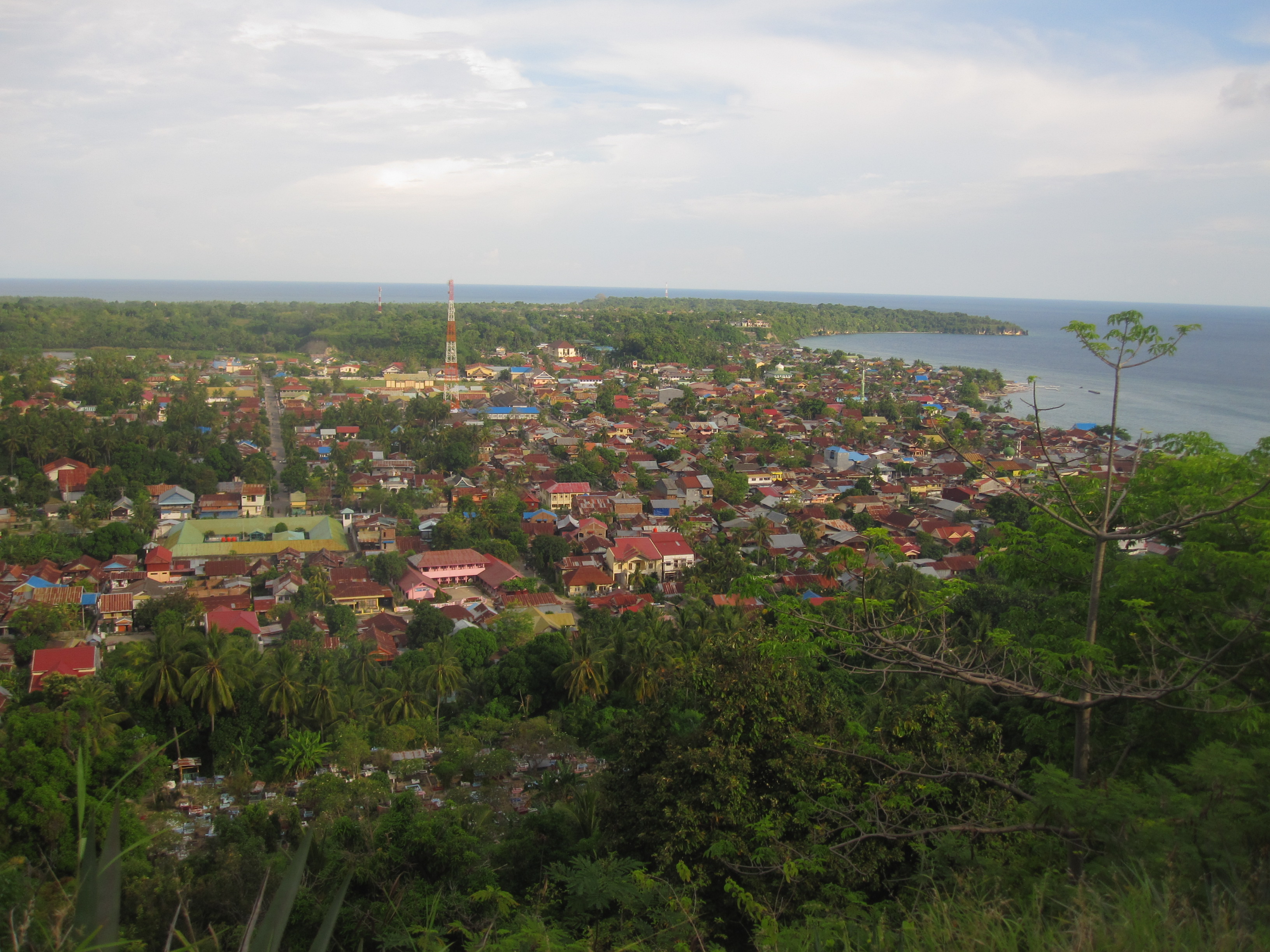
- Town of Banggae

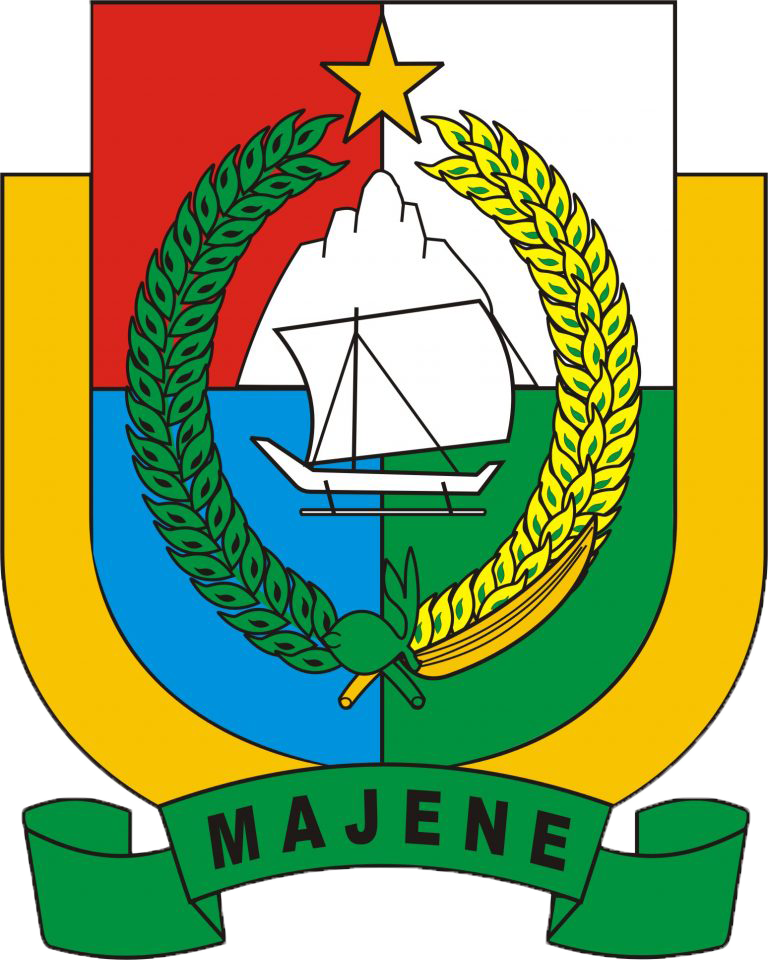
- Coat of arms

- Country: Indonesia
- Province: West Sulawesi
- Capital: Banggae (Majene)

Government
  - Regent: Andi Achmad Syukri Tammalele
  - Vice Regent: Andi Ritamariani

Area
  - Total: 947.84 km^{2} (365.96 sq mi)

Population (mid 2025 estimate)
  - Total: 191,626
  - Density: 202.17/km^{2} (523.62/sq mi)
- Time zone: UTC+8 (ICST)
- Area code: (+62) 422
- Website: majenekab.go.id

Majene Regency (Indonesian: Kabupaten Majene) is one of the six regencies which comprise West Sulawesi Province, Indonesia, on the island of Sulawesi. The Regency covers a land area of 947.84 km^{2}, and had a population of 151,197 at the 2010 Census and 174,407 at the 2020 Census; the official estimate as at mid 2025 was 191,626 (comprising 95,914 males and 95,016 females). The town of Majene in the far south of the regency is the administrative capital, and consists of two administrative districts - Banggae and Banggae Timur - with over 43% of the regency population between them.

== History ==
=== The National Era ===
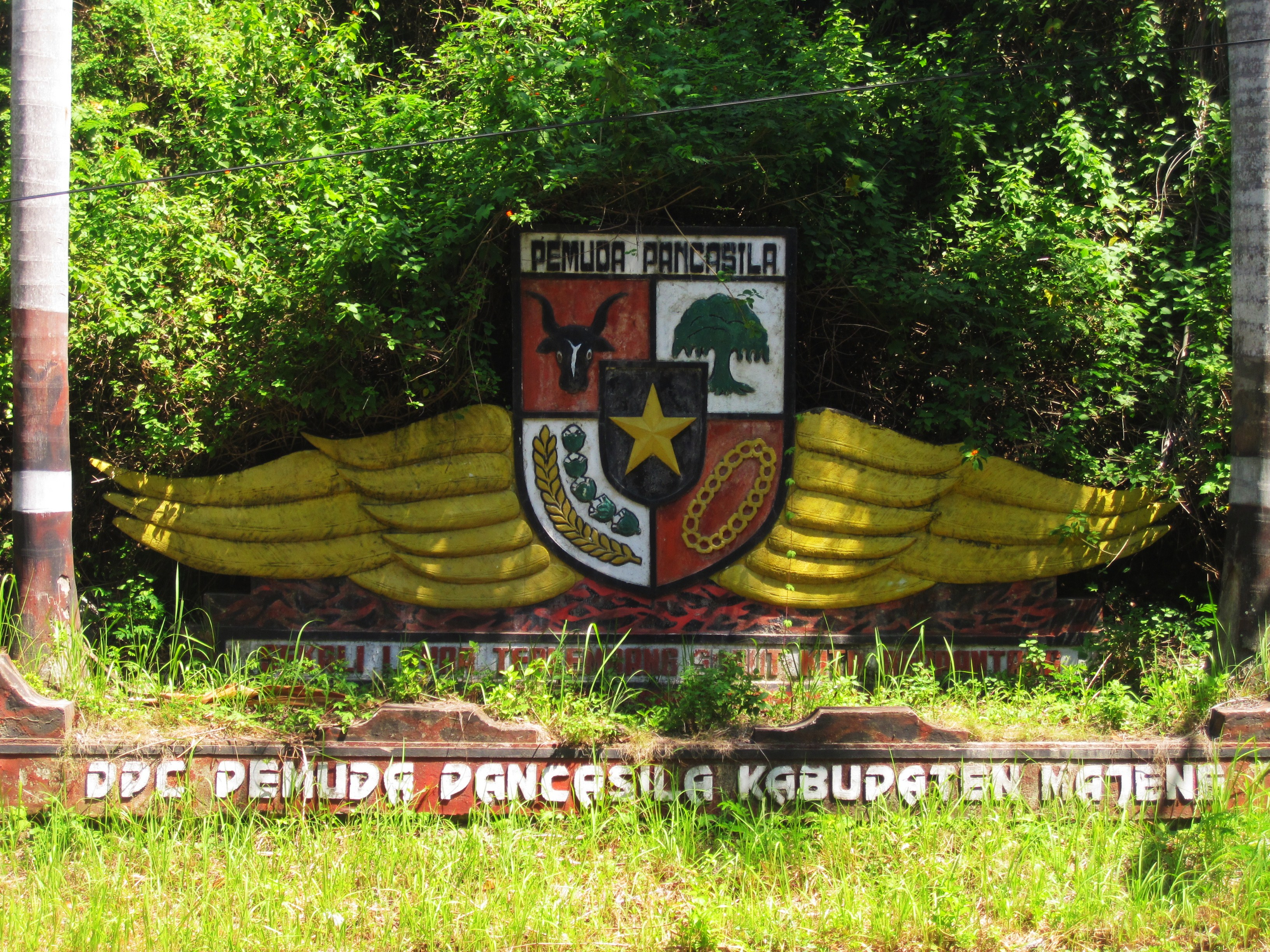
Pancasila Majene

On January 15 2021, a magnitude 6.2 earthquake struck east of Majene. The earthquake caused extensive damage in the town, destroying many homes, buildings and schools. 108 people were killed and over 3,000 were injured, most of them in Majene and Mamuju.

== Economy ==
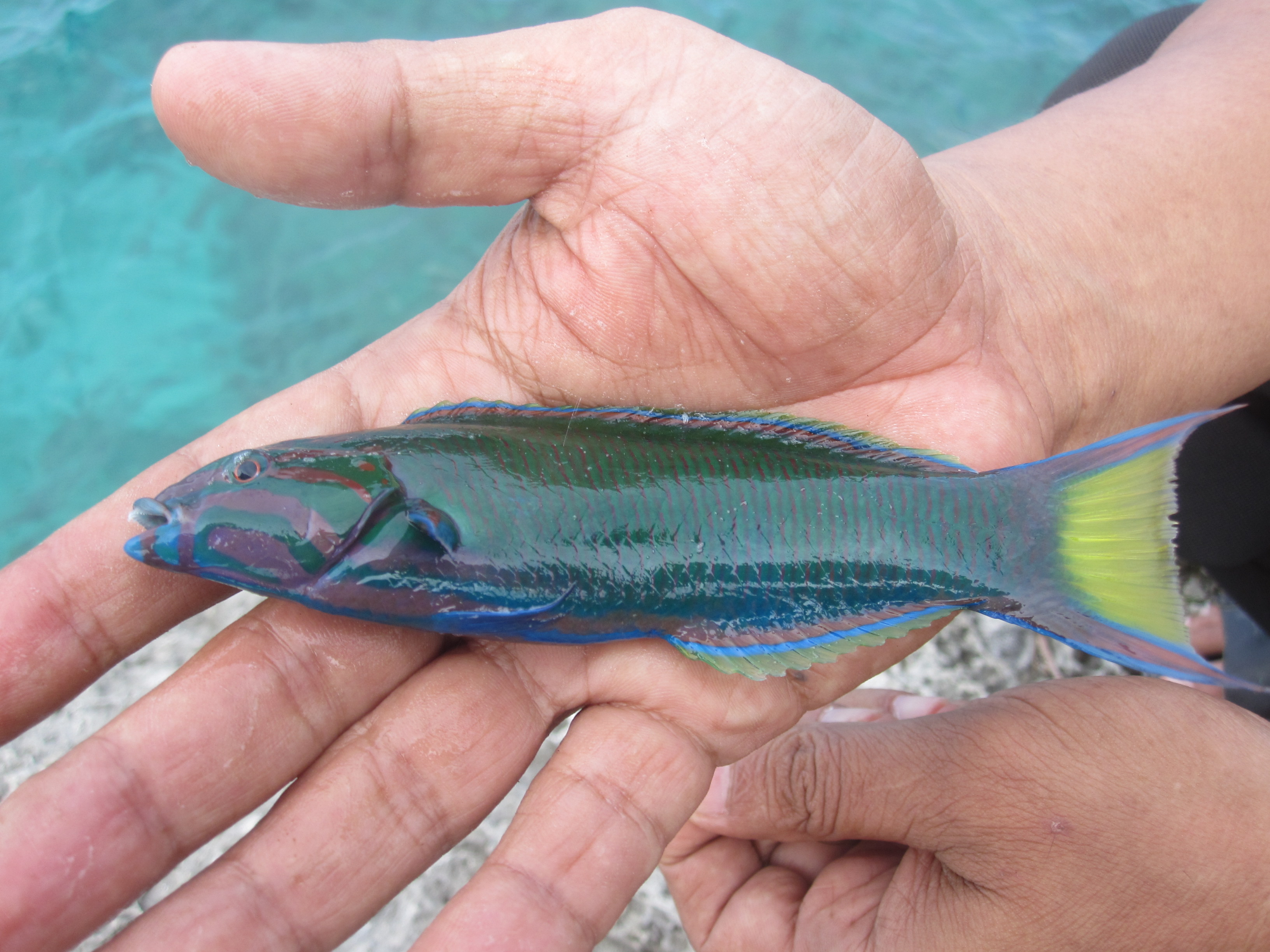
Fresh fish (moon wrasse) from Dato Beach

The Mandar people traditionally engage in fishing, agriculture, silk weaking, and traditional dance, with key agricultural products including cassava, rice, coconut, and bananas. Local political offices in the region are predominantly held by individuals of Mandar origin.

Cell phone and computer repair shops have sprung up in response to the various technological needs of the people and internet cafes (warnets) are quick to open as soon as Internet services become available.

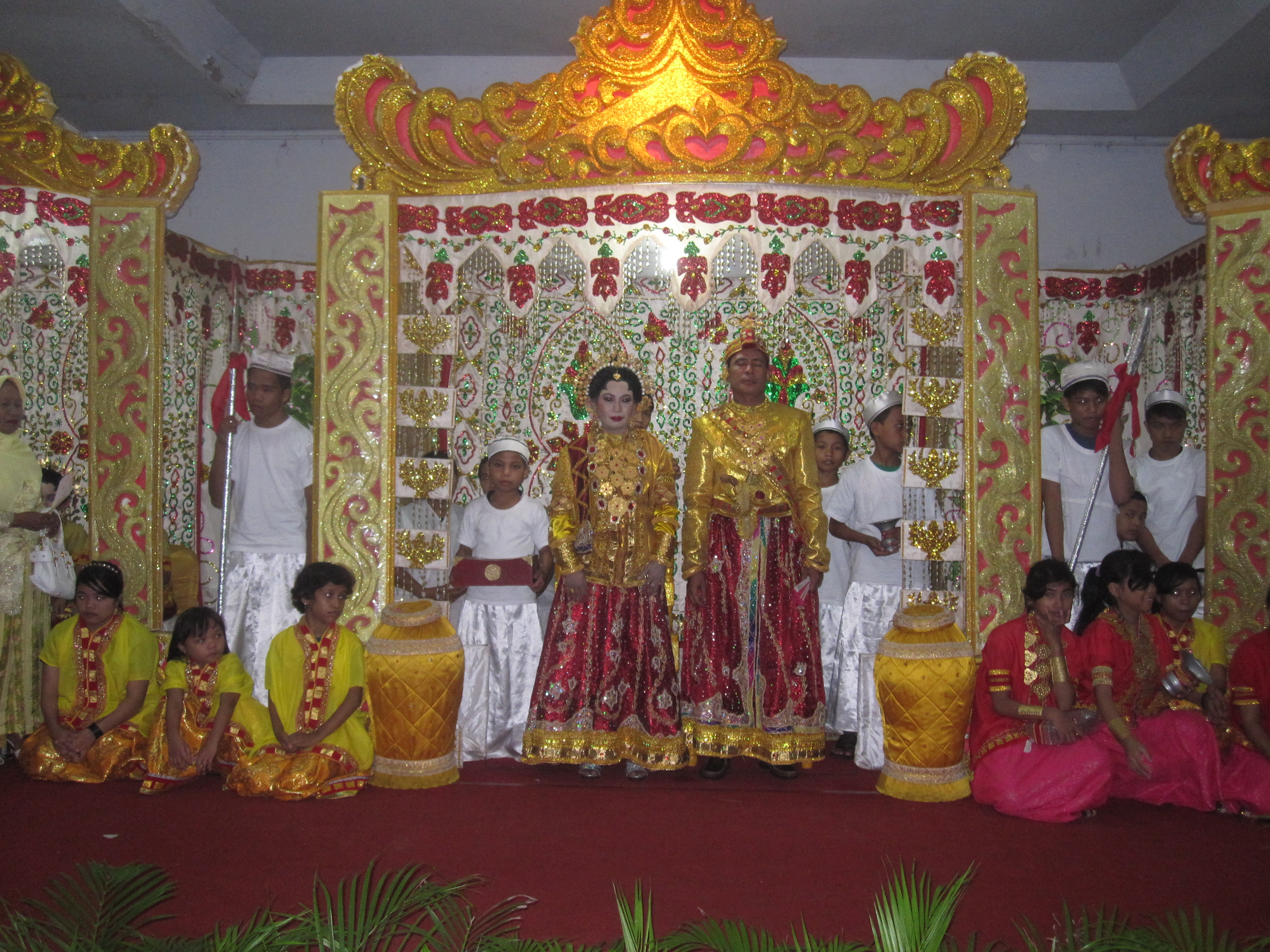
Traditional Mandar wedding

Cacao production and exportation has experienced significant growth in the region in recent years. Philippine and Chinese investors plan on building micro-hydro powered cacao processing plants near Majene by 2011. With this acceleration in cacao production, Governor of West Sulawesi Anwar Adnan Saleh is optimistic that the region will help Indonesia to become the world's largest cocoa producer and exporter. Indonesia is currently the world's third largest cocoa producer after Côte d'Ivoire and Ghana, contributing export earnings in excess of US$1.4 billion per year.

In 2006, ExxonMobil began drilling offshore oil off the Majene Regency in Makassar Strait. However by 2013, ExxonMobil returned Mandar Block to the government as it failed to find substantial oil after three exploration wells.

== Administration ==
The regency is divided into eight districts (kecamatan), tabulated below with their areas and their populations at the 2010 Census and the 2020 Census, together with the official estimates as at mid 2025. The table also includes the locations of the district administrative centres, the number of villages in each district (a total of 62 rural desa and 20 urban kelurahan) in each district, and its post code.

Kode Wilayah	Name of District (kecamatan)	Area in km^{2}	Pop'n Census 2010	Pop'n Census 2020	Pop'n Estimate mid 2025	Admin centre	No. of villages	Post code
76.05.01	Banggae	25.15	37,333	43,304	46,974	Totoli	8 ^{(a)}	81411 - 81415
76.05.08	Banggae Timur (East Banggae)	30.04	28,550	30,579	35,589	Labuang Utara (North Labuang)	9 ^{(b)}	81411 - 81414
76.05.02	Pamboang	70.19	20,800	24,087	26,106	Lalampanua	15 ^{(c)}	81451
76.05.03	Sendana ^{(d)}	82.24	20,374	24,299	26,552	Mosso Dhua	16 ^{(e)}	81452
76.05.06	Tammerodo Sendana	55.40	10,584	12,646	13,481	Tammerodo	7	81450
76.05.07	Tubo Sendana	41.17	8,214	9,759	10,529	Bonde Bonde	7	81455
76.05.04	Malunda	187.65	16,986	19,894	21,418	Malunda	12 ^{(f)}	81453
76.05.05	Ulumanda	456.00	8,266	9,839	10,974	Kabiraan	8	81454
	Totals	947.84	151,107	174,407	191,626	Majene	82	

Notes: (a) including the 6 urban villages (kelurahan) of Banggae, Baru, Galung, Pangali-Ali, Rangas and Totoli.
(b) including the 8 urban villages of Baruga, Baruga Dhua, Baurung, Labuang, Labuang Utara, Lembang, Tande and Tande Timur.
(c) including the 2 urban villages of Lalampanua and Sirindu. (d) includes the small offshore islands of Pulau Lereklerekan and Pulau Taimanu.
(e) including the 2 urban villages of Mosso and Mosso Dhua. (f) including the 2 urban villages of Lamungang Batu and Malunda.
