= Central Mamuju Regency =

Regency in West Sulawesi, Indonesia

Central Mamuju Regency Kabupaten Mamuju Tengah
- Regency
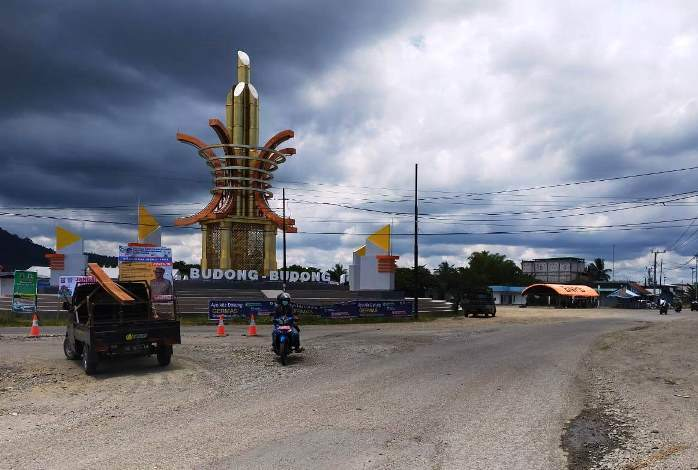
- Mangiwang monument in the capital of Central Mamuju

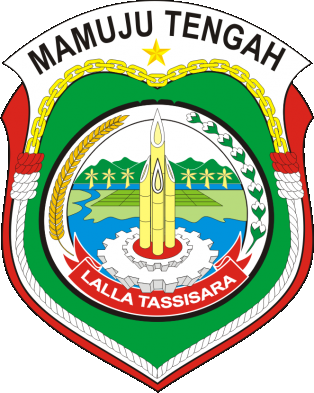
- Coat of arms
- Motto: Lalla Tassisara (Unite Over Diversity)
- Location of Central Mamuju Regency in red

- Location in Sulawesi and Indonesia Central Mamuju Regency (Indonesia)
- Coordinates: 2.0901046°S 119.4880718°E
- Country: Indonesia
- Province: West Sulawesi
- Established: 14 December 2012
- Capital: Tobadak

Government
  - Regent: Arsal Aras
  - Vice Regent: Askary Anwar

Area
  - Total: 2,758.33 km^{2} (1,065.00 sq mi)

Population (mid 2025 estimate)
  - Total: 145,883
  - Density: 52.8882/km^{2} (136.980/sq mi)
- Time zone: UTC+8 (ICST)
- Website: mamujutengahkab.go.id

Central Mamuju Regency is a regency in the province of West Sulawesi, Indonesia. The regency was established on 14 December 2012, comprising five districts (kecamatan) which had formerly been part of Mamuju Regency. It covers an area of 2,758.33 km^{2} and had a population of 105,495 at the 2010 Census and 135,280 at the 2020 Census; the official estimate as at mid 2025 was 145,883 (comprising 74,931 males and 70,952 females).

== Administration ==
The regency is divided into five districts (kecamatan), tabulated below with their areas and their populations at the 2010 Census and 2020 Census, together with the official estimates as at mid 2025 (rounded to the nearest 10 persons). The table also includes the locations of the district administrative centres, and the number of villages (all classed as rural desa) in each district.

| Kode Wilayah | Name of District (kecamatan) | Area in km^{2} | Pop'n Census 2010 | Pop'n Census 2020 | Pop'n Estimate mid 2025 | Admin centre | No. of desa |
|---|---|---|---|---|---|---|---|
| 76.06.02 | Pangale | 115.03 | 11,418 | 14,129 | 15,600 | Polo Pangale | 9 |
| 76.06.03 | Budong-Budong | 235.14 | 22,823 | 29,294 | 31,020 | Babana | 11 |
| 76.06.01 | Tobadak | 372.33 | 23,637 | 29,269 | 30,620 | Mahahe | 8 |
| 76.06.04 | Topoyo ^{(a)} | 876.66 | 25,767 | 34,417 | 38,750 | Waeputeh | 15 |
| 76.06.05 | Karossa ^{(b)} | 1,159.17 | 22,004 | 28,171 | 29,890 | Karossa | 11 |
| | Totals | 2,758.33 | 105,649 | 135,280 | 145,883 | Tobadak | 54 |

Notes: (a) Most of the population is in the west, near the coast. The desa of Salulekbo in the east comprises over 80% of the district's land area but had only 3,315 people in 2024.
(b) Most of the population is in the west, near the coast, chiefly in the desa of Karossa (with 7,764 people in 2024) and Tasokko (with 5,366 people in 2024).

== Climate ==
Central Mamuju regency has a tropical rainforest climate (Af) with heavy rainfall year-round. The following climate data is for the town of Tobadak, the seat of the regency.

Climate data for Tobadak
| Month | Jan | Feb | Mar | Apr | May | Jun | Jul | Aug | Sep | Oct | Nov | Dec | Year |
|---|---|---|---|---|---|---|---|---|---|---|---|---|---|
| Mean daily maximum °C (°F) | 29.2 (84.6) | 29.5 (85.1) | 29.5 (85.1) | 29.7 (85.5) | 29.9 (85.8) | 29.0 (84.2) | 28.4 (83.1) | 29.5 (85.1) | 29.9 (85.8) | 31.0 (87.8) | 30.2 (86.4) | 29.6 (85.3) | 29.6 (85.3) |
| Daily mean °C (°F) | 25.6 (78.1) | 25.8 (78.4) | 25.7 (78.3) | 25.9 (78.6) | 26.2 (79.2) | 25.4 (77.7) | 24.6 (76.3) | 25.4 (77.7) | 25.6 (78.1) | 26.6 (79.9) | 26.1 (79.0) | 25.8 (78.4) | 25.7 (78.3) |
| Mean daily minimum °C (°F) | 22.0 (71.6) | 22.1 (71.8) | 22.0 (71.6) | 22.1 (71.8) | 22.6 (72.7) | 21.9 (71.4) | 20.9 (69.6) | 21.4 (70.5) | 21.3 (70.3) | 22.2 (72.0) | 22.1 (71.8) | 22.1 (71.8) | 21.9 (71.4) |
| Average rainfall mm (inches) | 225 (8.9) | 206 (8.1) | 235 (9.3) | 278 (10.9) | 282 (11.1) | 233 (9.2) | 176 (6.9) | 177 (7.0) | 173 (6.8) | 164 (6.5) | 231 (9.1) | 216 (8.5) | 2,596 (102.3) |
Source: Climate-Data.org
