= Pasangkayu Regency =

Regency in West Sulawesi, Indonesia

- Regency
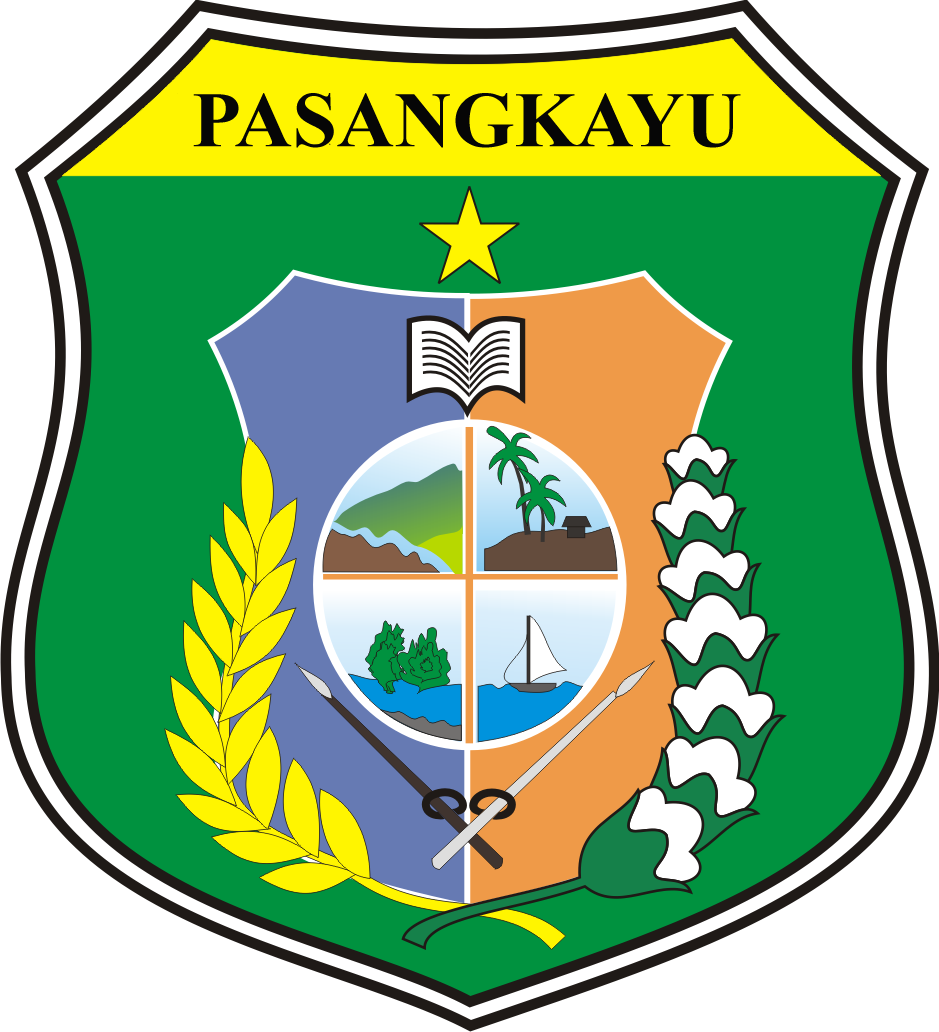
- Coat of arms

- Location within West Sulawesi

- Location in Sulawesi and Indonesia Pasangkayu Regency (Indonesia)
- Coordinates: 1.3181°S 119.3751°E
- Country: Indonesia
- Province: West Sulawesi
- Capital: Pasangkayu

Government
  - Regent: Yaumil Ambo Djiwa
  - Vice Regent: Herny Agus

Area
  - Total: 3,043.75 km^{2} (1,175.20 sq mi)

Population (mid 2025 estimate)
  - Total: 184,371
  - Density: 60.5736/km^{2} (156.885/sq mi)
- Time zone: UTC+8 (WITA)
- Postcode: 91571
- Area code: (+62) 457
- Website: pasangkayukab.go.id

Pasangkayu Regency (Indonesian: Kabupaten Pasangkayu) is one of the six regencies which comprise West Sulawesi Province, Indonesia, on the island of Sulawesi. It covers an area of 3,043.75 km^{2} and had a population of 134,303 at the 2010 Census and 188,861 at the 2020 Census. The official estimate as at mid 2025 was 184,371 (comprising 94,720 males and 89,651 females). The majority of the indigenous population speak the Kaili language, also indigenous in the southern part of Donggala Regency and in Sigi Regency to the east. The town of Pasangkayu is the capital and chief town of the regency.

== History ==
The regency was initially named North Mamuju Regency from its creation on 25 February 2003 (from the former northern districts of Mamuju Regency), until it was renamed as Pasangkayu Regency in March 2018.

== Administrative districts ==
The regency is divided into twelve districts (kecamatan), tabulated below from south to north with their areas and their populations at the 2010 Census and the 2020 Census, together with the official estimates as at mid 2025. The table also includes the locations of the district administrative centres, the number of administrative villages in each district (totaling 59 rural desa and 4 urban kelurahan), and its postal code.

Kode Wilayah	Name of District (kecamatan)	Area in km^{2}	Pop'n Census 2010	Pop'n Census 2020	Pop'n Estimate mid 2025	Admin centre	No. of villages	Post code
76.01.04	Sarudu	99.06	12,168	15,902	16,409	Saruda	5	91576
76.01.05	Dapurang	921.95	11,530	17,652	17,067	Dapurang	5	91581
76.01.06	Duripoku	215.45	4,875	6,486	6,441	Tammarunang	4	91573
76.01.03	Baras	277.87	15,356	22,674	21,198	Baras	6 ^{(a)}	91572
76.01.07	Bulu Taba	428.62	9,396	12,011	12,146	Lilimori	7	91578
76.01.12	Lariang	83.34	5,993	7,787	8,243	Parabu	7	91577
76.01.08	Tikke Raya	266.59	13,805	18,206	18,474	Jengeng Raya	5	91579
76.01.09	Pedongga	94.00	6,563	13,478	8,755	Malei	4	91570
76.01.02	Pasangkayu	312.04	22,886	35,088	34,503	Pasangkayu	6 ^{(b)}	91571
76.01.01	Bambalamotu	242.96	16,292	20,589	21,048	Randomayang	6 ^{(c)}	91575
76.01.10	Bambaira	64.84	8,622	10,450	11,227	Bambaira	4	91574
76.01.11	Sarjo	37.03	6,883	8,538	8,860	Sarjo	4	91591
	Totals	3,043.75	134,369	188,861	184,371	Pasangkayu	63	

Notes: (a) including one kelurahan - the town of Baras (with 4,392 inhabitants in mid 2024).
(b) including two kelurahan - the towns of Pasangkayu (with 19,431 inhabitants in mid 2024) and Martajaya (2,151 inhabitants).
(c) including one kelurahan - the town of Bambalamotu (with 4,087 inhabitants in mid 2024).

== Climate ==
Pasangkayu has a tropical rainforest climate (Af) with heavy rainfall year-round.

Climate data for Pasangkayu
Month	Jan	Feb	Mar	Apr	May	Jun	Jul	Aug	Sep	Oct	Nov	Dec	Year
Mean daily maximum °C (°F)	30.3 (86.5)	30.5 (86.9)	30.7 (87.3)	30.7 (87.3)	31.1 (88.0)	30.3 (86.5)	29.5 (85.1)	30.7 (87.3)	30.9 (87.6)	32.0 (89.6)	31.1 (88.0)	30.8 (87.4)	30.7 (87.3)
Daily mean °C (°F)	26.7 (80.1)	26.8 (80.2)	27.0 (80.6)	26.9 (80.4)	27.5 (81.5)	26.8 (80.2)	25.8 (78.4)	26.8 (80.2)	26.8 (80.2)	27.7 (81.9)	27.1 (80.8)	27.1 (80.8)	26.9 (80.4)
Mean daily minimum °C (°F)	23.1 (73.6)	23.2 (73.8)	23.3 (73.9)	23.2 (73.8)	23.9 (75.0)	23.3 (73.9)	22.1 (71.8)	22.9 (73.2)	22.7 (72.9)	23.5 (74.3)	23.2 (73.8)	23.4 (74.1)	23.1 (73.7)
Average rainfall mm (inches)	251 (9.9)	195 (7.7)	165 (6.5)	178 (7.0)	237 (9.3)	191 (7.5)	195 (7.7)	189 (7.4)	216 (8.5)	175 (6.9)	208 (8.2)	189 (7.4)	2,389 (94)
Source: Climate-Data.org
