= Mamuju Regency =

Regency in West Sulawesi, Indonesia

Coordinates: 2°41′S 118°54′E

- Regency
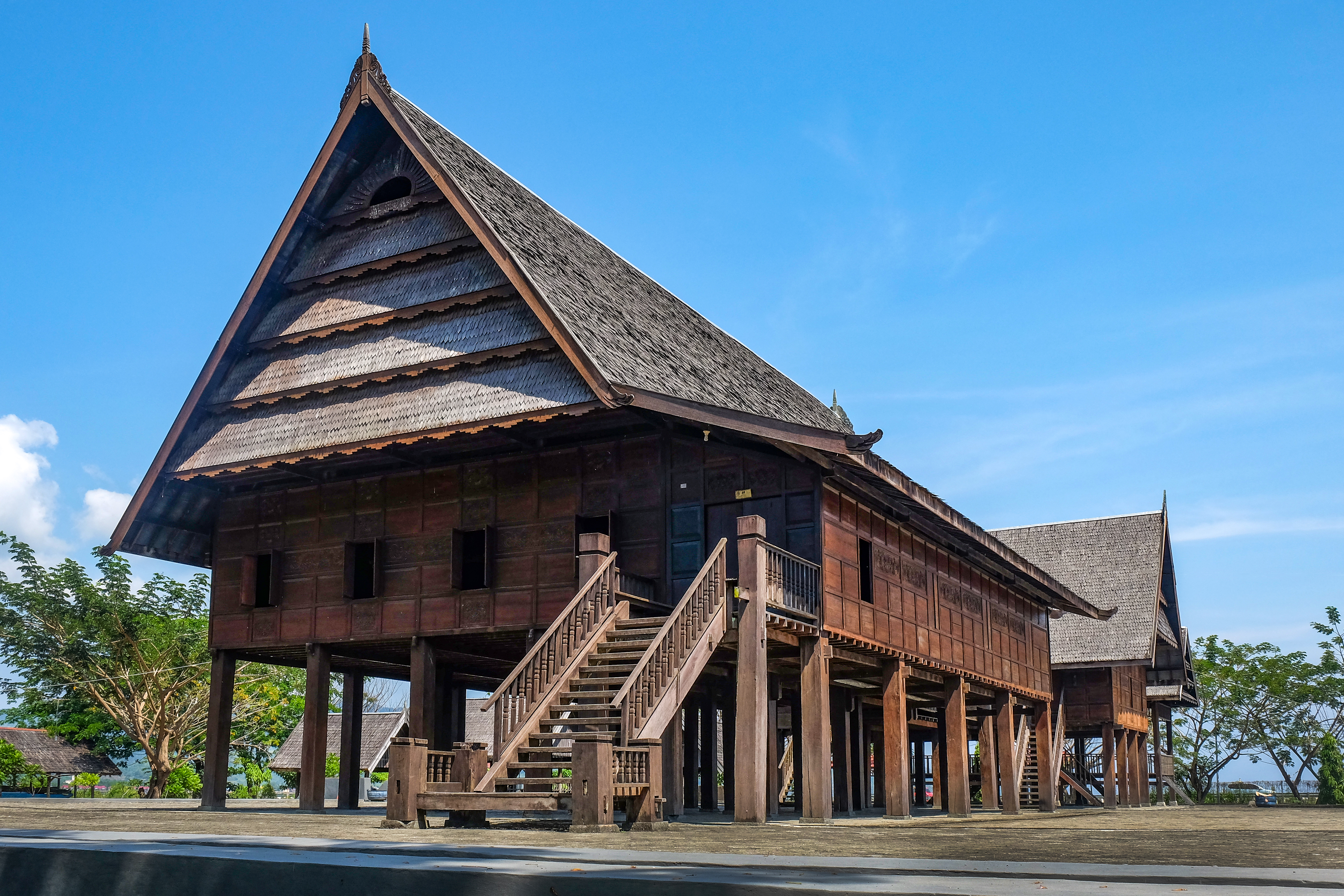
- A mandar traditional house in Mamuju

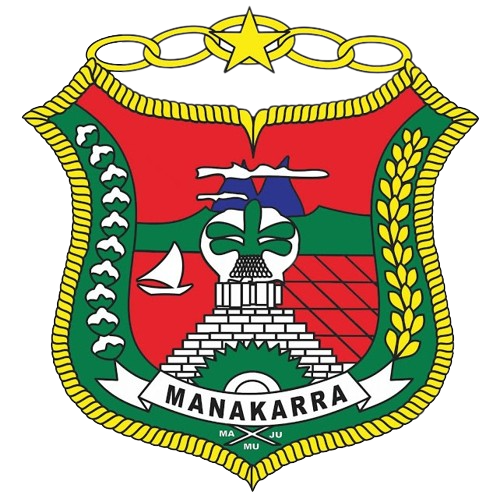
- Coat of arms
- Motto(s): Manakarra (A Sacred Land of Inheritance)
- Country: Indonesia
- Province: West Sulawesi
- Regency: Mamuju

Government
  - Regent: Siti Sutina Suhardi
  - Vice Regent: Yuki Permana

Area
  - Total: 4,936.02 km^{2} (1,905.81 sq mi)

Population (mid 2025 estimate)
  - Total: 292,298
  - Density: 59.2173/km^{2} (153.372/sq mi)
- Time zone: UTC+8 (Indonesia Central Time)
- Area code: +62 426
- Website: mamujukab.go.id

Mamuju Regency is a regency (Indonesian: kabupaten Mamuju) of West Sulawesi province, Indonesia. The regency capital is at Karema, while Mamuju town is the capital of West Sulawesi. The population of the regency was 336,879 at the 2010 Census, but it was substantially reduced by the creation of the new Central Mamuju Regency which was cut out of it on 14 December 2012. The reduced Mamuju Regency covers an area of 4,936.02 km^{2} and had a population of 278,764 at the 2020 Census; the official estimate as at mid 2025 was 292,298 (comprising 149,651 males and 142,647 females).

== Administration ==
The regency is divided into eleven districts (kecamatan), tabulated below with their areas and their populations at the 2010 Census and 2020 Census, together with the official estimates for mid 2025. The totals for the area and the 2010 population exclude those districts split off in 2012 to form the separate Central Mamuju Regency. The table also includes the locations of the district administrative centres, the number of administrative villages in each district (totalling 88 rural desa and 14 urban kelurahan), and its post code.

Kode Wilayah	Name of District (kecamatan)	Area in km^{2}	Pop'n Census 2010	Pop'n Census 2020	Pop'n Estimate mid 2025	Admin centre	No. of villages	Post code
76.02.02	Tapalang	284.42	18,083	20,820	21,551	Galung	10 ^{(a)}	91551
76.02.13	Tapalang Barat (West Tapalang)	110.84	9,129	11,373	12,249	Dungkait	7	91552
76.02.01	Mamuju ^{(b)}	224.90	55,105	64,696	67,005	Binanga	9 ^{(c)}	91511 - 91515
76.02.12	Simboro	140.11	23,200	36,063	40,308	Rangas	8 ^{(d)}	91512 - 91513
76.02.16	Kepulauan Balabalakang ^{(e)} (Balabalakang Islands)	5.31	2,347	2,201	2,237	Pulau Salissingan (Salissingan Island)	2	91512
76.02.03	Kalukku ^{(f)}	460.65	49,250	59,108	61,006	Kalukku	14 ^{(g)}	91561
76.02.07	Papalang	200.69	21,395	23,942	25,056	Topore	9	91565
76.02.08	Sampaga	110.96	13,986	15,925	16,060	Bunde	7	91563
76.02.11	Tommo	987.90	19,407	23,381	25,041	Campaloga	14	91564
76.02.04	Kalumpang	1,580.07	10,800	11,763	12,303	Kalumpang	13	91560
76.02.15	Bonehau	830.47	8,622	9,492	9,482	Bonehau	9	91562
	Totals	4,936.02	231,324	278,764	292,298	Karema	102	

Notes: (a) including 3 kelurahan - Dayanginna, Galung and Kasambang. (b) including offshore island of Pulau Karampuang to the north of the town.
(c) including 5 kelurahan - Binanga, Kasiwa, Karema, Mamunyu and Rimuku. (d) including 2 kelurahan - Rangas and Simboro.
(e) the Balabalakang Islands are a small group lying between West Sulawesi and East Kalimantan, and closer to the latter.
(f) including 4 offshore islands. (g) including 4 kelurahan - Bebanga, Kalukku, Sinyonyoi and Sinyonyoi Selatan.
