= West Sulawesi =

Province in Sulawesi, Indonesia

West Sulawesi Sulawesi Barat
- Province
- Province of West Sulawesi; Provinsi Sulawesi Barat
- Coat of arms
- Motto: Mellete Diatonganan (Mandar); Stick to the Truth
- West Sulawesi in Indonesia
- Interactive map of West Sulawesi
- Coordinates: 2°41′S 118°54′E
- Country: Indonesia
- Region: Sulawesi (Eastern Indonesia)
- Established: 22 September 2004
- Capital: Mamuju

Government
  - Governor: Suhardi Duka (Democratic)
  - Vice Governor: vacant
  - Legislature: West Sulawesi Regional House of Representatives (DPRD)

Area
  - Total: 16,590.67 km^{2} (6,405.69 sq mi)
  - Rank: 31st in Indonesia
- Highest elevation: 3,074 m (10,085 ft)

Population (mid 2025 estimate)
  - Total: 1,525,335
  - Density: 91.93932/km^{2} (238.1218/sq mi)

Demographics
  - Ethnic groups (2010): 45.42% Mandar; 12.49% Buginese; 10.91% Mamasa; 8.12% Kalumpangs; 4.92% Javanese; 2.61% Pattae'; 2.19% Makassarese; 9.0% others
  - Religion (2016): 82.2% Islam; 14.8% Protestantism; 1.47% Catholicism; 1.25% Hinduism; 0.19% Folk; 0.04% Buddhism; 0.01% Confucianism
  - Languages and dialects: Indonesian (official), Mandar, Buginese, Mamasa, Kalumpang, Pattae', Makassaress, Mamuju and others (regional)
- Time zone: UTC+08 (WITA)
- HDI (2024): ▲0.705 (32nd) – high
- Website: sulbarprov.go.id

West Sulawesi (Indonesian: Sulawesi Barat), covering a land area of 16,590.67 km^{2} with its capital at Mamuju, is a province of Indonesia on the western side of Sulawesi (formerly Celebes) island, consisting of six regencies (kabupaten), namely Polewali Mandar, Mamasa, Majene, Mamuju, Central Mamuju and Pasangkayu (formerly called North Mamuju).

== History ==
On 11 December 2019, a team of researchers led by Dr. Maxime Aubert announced the discovery of the oldest hunting scenes in prehistoric art in the world which is more than 44,000 years old from the limestone cave of Leang Bulu’ Sipong 4. Archaeologists determined the age of the depiction of hunting a pig and buffalo thanks to the calcite ‘popcorn’, different isotope levels of radioactive uranium and thorium.

== Geography ==
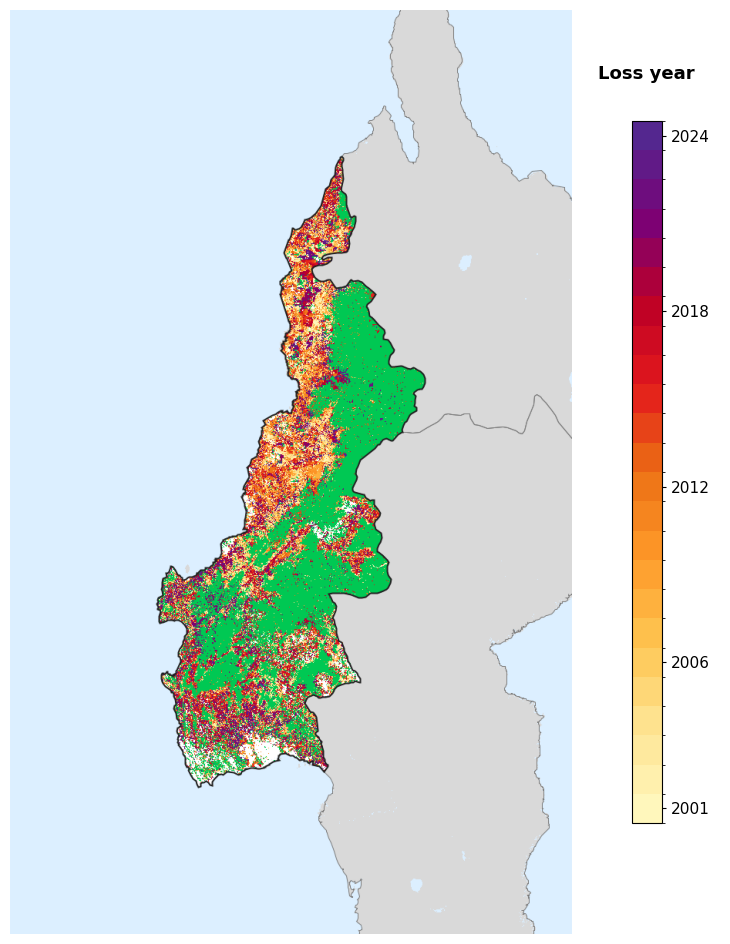
Tree-cover loss year in West Sulawesi, 2001-2024, from the Global Forest Change dataset.

The West Sulawesi Province, borders the provinces of South Sulawesi and Central Sulawesi to the east, Makassar Strait to the west, and the Pacific Ocean to the south. The province also shares maritime borders with East Kalimantan and South Kalimantan to the west.

Gandang Dewata National Park, with its core at and around Gandang Dewata mountain, forms the centre of province. Karama River and Lariang River which rises in Donggala Regency of Central Sulawesi goes on to form part of the border between Central Sulawesi and West Sulawesi and enters the Macassar Strait just past the town of Lariang, are the major rivers which drain the province. Balabalagan Islands in Mamuju Regency are also part of the province. The islands rest on a coral reef, itself placed on an undersea bank which extends out from Kalimantan, presenting a major hazard to navigation; the Admiralty Pilot has warned that "No vessel should venture among [them] without local knowledge."

== Economy ==
Its economy consists mainly of mining, agriculture and fishing.

== Government and administrative divisions ==
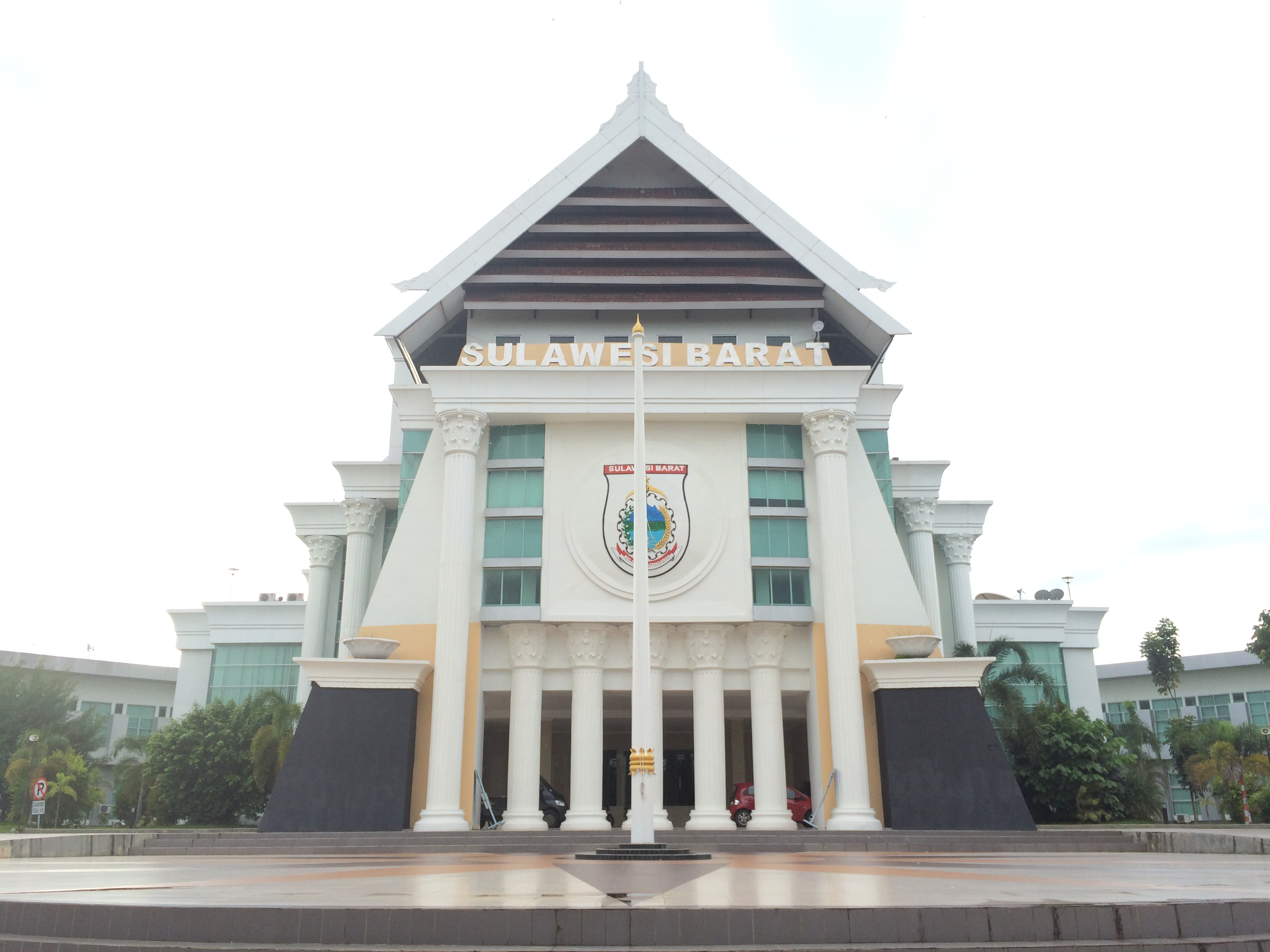
Governor Office of West Sulawesi

West Sulawesi Province is divided into six regencies: Polewali Mandar, Mamuju, Pasangkayu, Mamasa, Majene, and Central Mamuju. The sixth regency - Central Mamuju Regency (Kabupaten Mamuju Tengah) - was cut out of the existing Mamuju Regency on 14 December 2012.

The province now forms one of Indonesia's 84 national electoral districts to elect members to the People's Representative Council. The West Sulawesi Electoral District consists of all of the 6 regencies in the province, and elects 4 members to the People's Representative Council.

== Demographics ==
Historical population
Year	Pop.	±%
1971	462,152	—
1980	581,010	+25.7%
1990	689,493	+18.7%
2000	900,457	+30.6%
2010	1,158,651	+28.7%
2020	1,419,229	+22.5%
2025	1,525,335	+7.5%
Source: Statistics Indonesia 2026 and earlier. West Sulawesi was part of South Sulawesi Province until 2004.

Its population at the 2010 census was 1,158,651 increasing at 2.67% annually. Of those 171,356 were classified as below the poverty line of Indonesia. The official estimate as at mid 2025 was 1,525,335, comprising 772,667 males and 752,668 females.

=== Religion ===
Religion by Regency in West Sulawesi Province (2016)
Regency	Islam	Protestant	Catholic	Hinduism	Buddhism	Confucianism /Konghucu	Folk
Majene	99.75%	0.10%	0.10%	0.02%	0.03%	0.00%	0.00%
Mamasa	20.29%	70.80%	4.35%	2.92%	0.01%	0.01%	1.62%
Mamuju	81.61%	16.61%	0.87%	0.88%	0.02%	0.01%	0.00%
Central Mamuju	80.24%	12.90%	2.18%	4.57%	0.10%	0.01%	0.01%
Pasangkayu	86.98%	6.99%	1.83%	4.19%	0.01%	0.01%	0.00%
Polewali Mandar	96.00%	2.77%	1.00%	0.19%	0.04%	0.00%	0.00%
West Sulawesi	82.22%	14.82%	1.47%	1.25%	0.04%	0.01%	0.19%

Religion in West Sulawesi (2022)
1. Islam (83.9%)
2. Protestantism (13.2%)
3. Hinduism (1.33%)
4. Roman Catholic (1.09%)
5. Folk religion and others (0.38%)
6. Buddhism (0.03%)

== Transport ==
There are is no rail transport, or national and state highways. The roads are mostly unpaved dirt tracks. There are two airports in the province: Sumarorong Airport (Bandar Udara Sumarorong) at Sumarorong town in Mamasa Regency and Tampa Padang Airport (Bandar Udara Tampa Padang) at Mamuju town in Mamuju Regency. The major airport nearby is the Sultan Hasanuddin International Airport at Makassar in South Sulawesi Province - located a 9.5 hour drive from the capital of West Sulawesi, Mamuju.

== See also ==
- Polewali-Mamasa
- List of regencies and cities in Indonesia
