= Toraja Church =

Protestant church in Indonesia

- Gereja Toraja
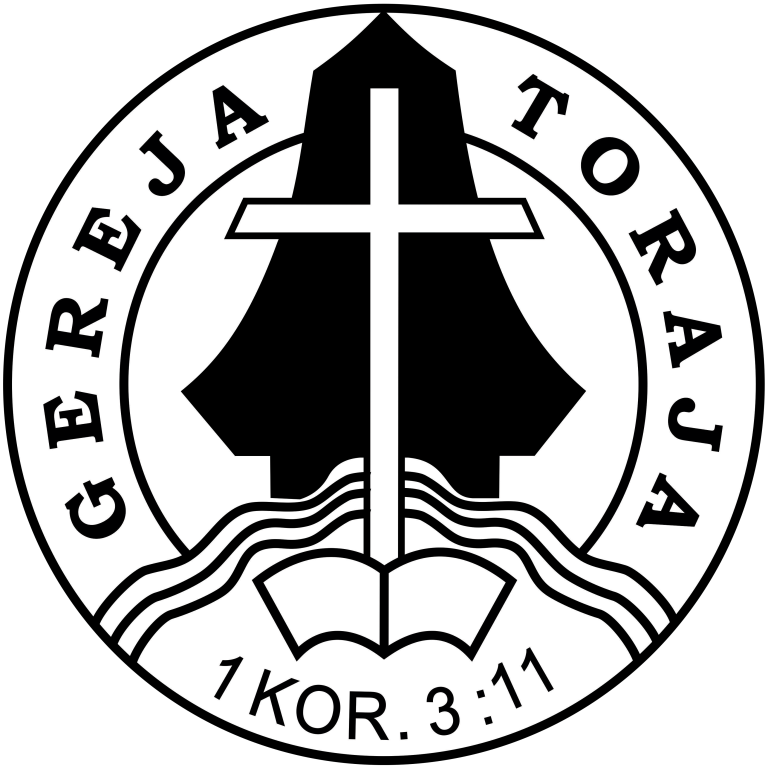
- Logo of Toraja Church
- Classification: Protestant, Calvinist (Reformed)
- Leader: Pdt. Dr. Alfred Yohanes Rantedatu Anggui, M.Th.
- Region: Indonesia; Malaysia
- Origin: 25 March 1947; Rantepao, North Toraja, South Sulawesi, Indonesia
- Separations: Protestant Church in Indonesia in Luwu
- Hospitals: Elim Hospital, Rantepao; Elim Mother and Child Hospital, Makassar
- Official website: gerejatoraja.id

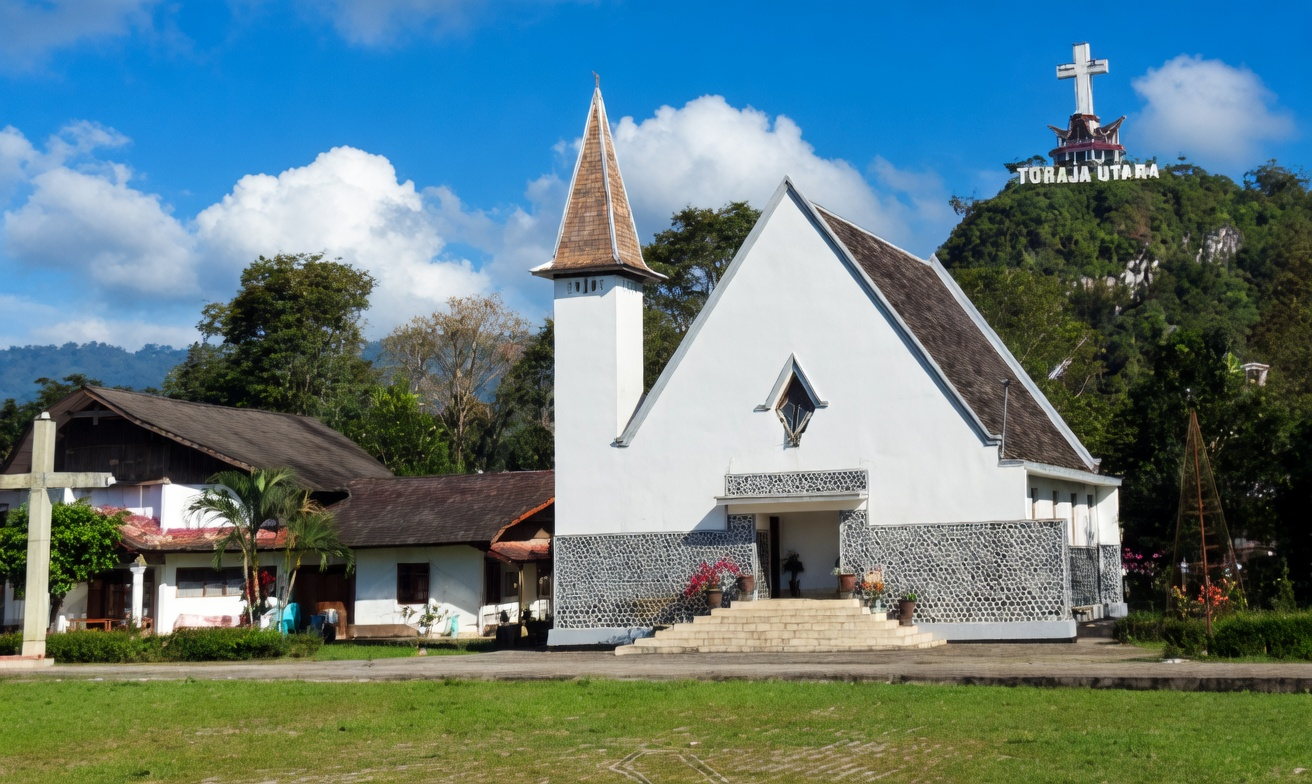
Toraja Church in Rantepao

Toraja Church is a Protestant Christian denomination in Tana Toraja, Indonesia, of which the majority of the Torajan people are members. This church is a member of the Communion of Churches in Indonesia since 1950.

On 1912-1913 the Gereformerde Missionary Bond-Holland of the Dutch Reformed Church begun working in this part of the country. On 7 November 1913, Reverend A.A. van de Loosdrecht became the first missionary who came to Rantepao. This time became the starting point when the Gospel was grown in the Torajanese's heart. But, Reverend van de Loosdrecht was killed in that place. Formally, Toraja Church was established on 25 March 1947 in Rantepao.

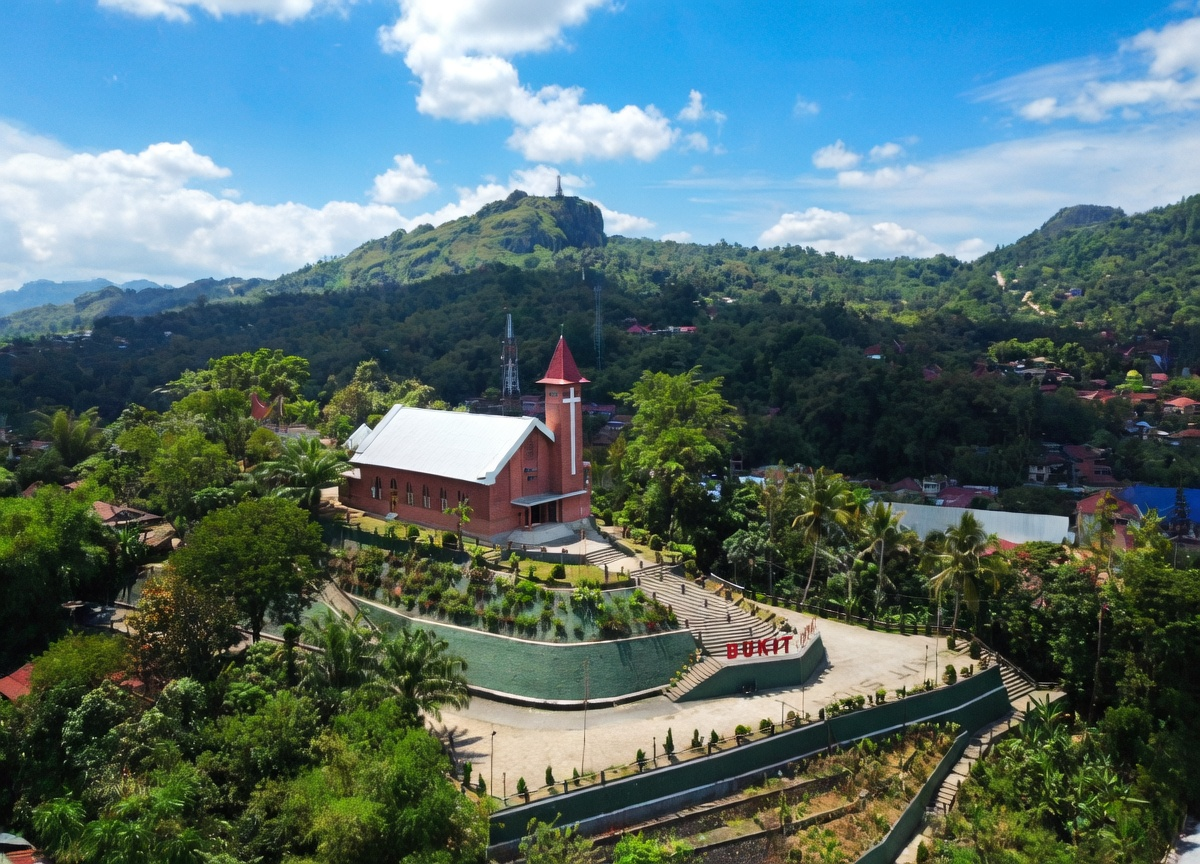
Toraja Church in Makale

In 1938 there were 14,000 Christians from 300,000 inhabitants there. In 1995 the church had 300,000 adherents. In 2012 the church had 400,000 members and 959 congregations. This church is the largest in South Sulawesi, with approximately 80% of the Christian population belong to it. It is a member of the World Communion of Reformed Churches.
