= Christina Maria Rantetana =

Indonesian politician (born 1955 in Makale)

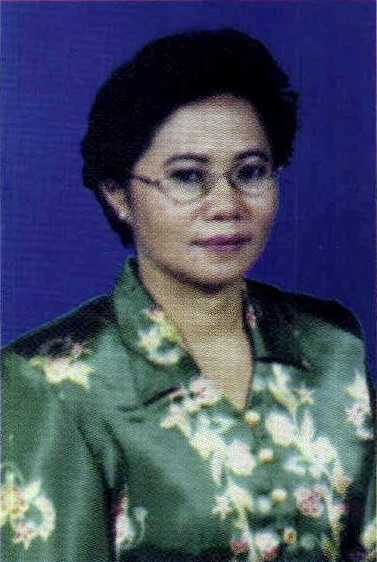

Member of People's Representative Council
- In office 1 October 1997 – 30 September 2004

Personal details
- Born: 24 July 1955 Tana Toraja, Sulawesi, Indonesia
- Died: 31 July 2016 (aged 61) Jakarta, Indonesia
- Party: Gerindra
- Education: University of Indonesia; Tulane University

Military service
- Allegiance: Indonesia
- Branch/service: Indonesian Navy
- Rank: Rear Admiral

Christina Maria Rantetana (24 July 1955 – 31 July 2016) was an officer of the Indonesian Navy, where she was the first woman to hold a star rank.

== Early life and career ==
Rantetana was born in the town of Makale in Tana Toraja Regency on 24 July 1955. After completing high school at a Catholic institution in 1974, she obtained a diploma in general care before joining the Indonesian military in 1979. She later obtained a bachelor's degree in public health from the University of Indonesia and a master's degree in the same subject from Tulane University.

== Naval career ==
In the Navy, Rantetana became a representative of the military and police (TNI/Polri) faction in the People's Representative Council for two periods, 1997-1999 and 1999–2004. In the latter period, she was the faction's secretary. On 1 November 2002, she was promoted to commodore (a one-star rank position), becoming the first woman to achieve that rank in the Indonesian Navy.

She was further promoted to rear admiral in June 2013, when she was assigned to the Coordinating Ministry for Political, Legal, and Security Affairs as an expert on ideology and constitutional affairs. The following month, she was reassigned to TNI headquarters, as she was approaching her retirement.

== Death ==
Rantetana died in a navy hospital in Jakarta on 31 July 2016. She was buried in a military-accompanied traditional Toraja funeral, where her body was placed in a hollowed out cavity 30 meters up a cliff accompanied by salvo shots.

== Personal life ==
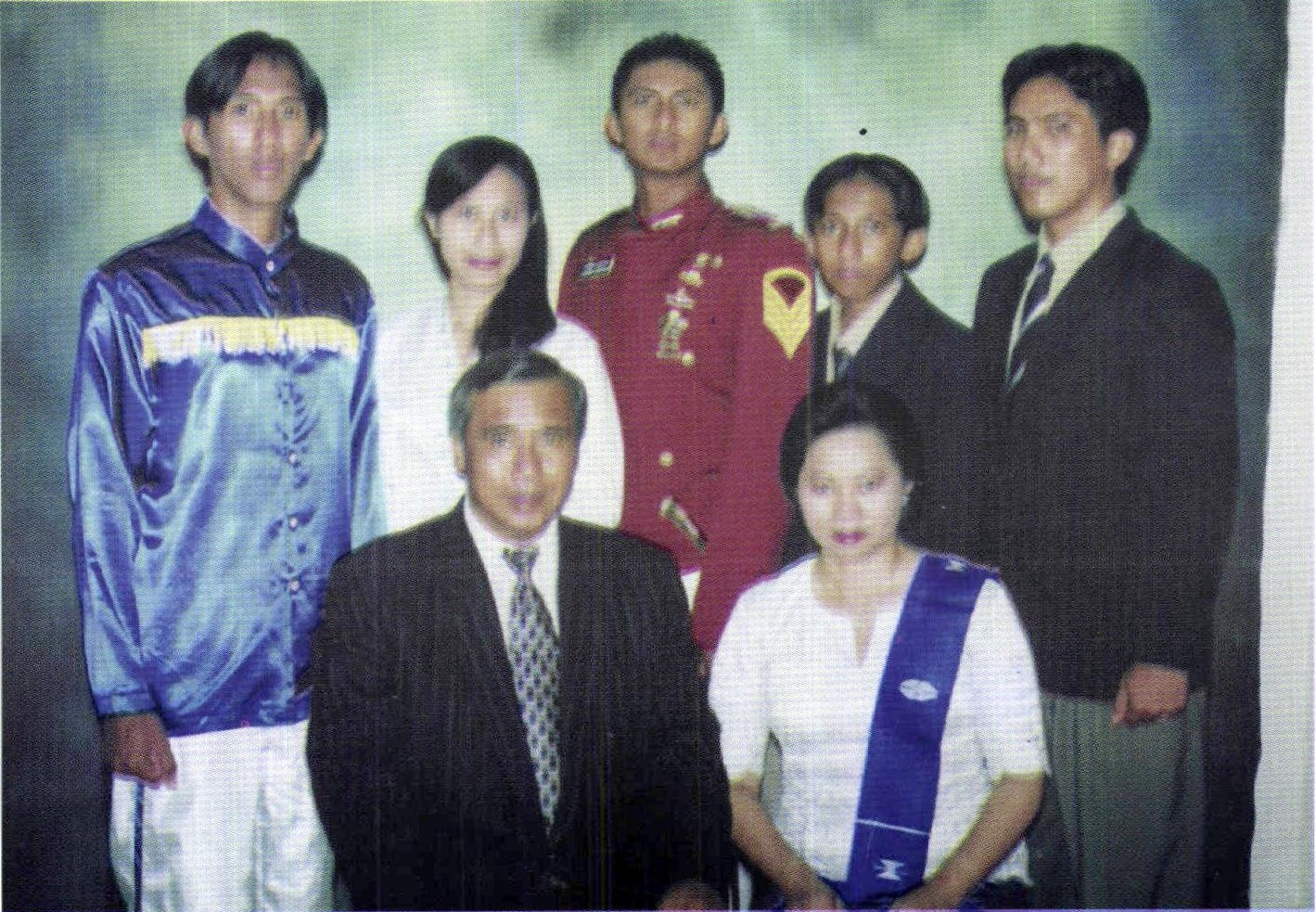
Christina Maria Rantetana and her family.

She had five children, and she took part in the construction of the Jesus Buntu Burake statue in Tana Toraja.
