= Hendrik van der Veen =

Dutch missionary worker and linguist

Hendrik van der Veen (1888–1977) was a Dutch missionary worker and linguist who worked in Tana Toraja, Dutch East Indies.

Van der Veen was born on 21 July 1888 in Rossum, Bommelerwaard, as the son of the pastor Jan van der Veen. He initially aimed to work as a linguist in Halmahera, but was sent to Tana Toraja at the suggestion of missionary Antonie Aris van de Loosdrecht.

The Biblical Institute of the Netherlands issued instructions to Dr. Hendrik van der Veen on June 9, 1916: his main task was the translation of the Bible, in accordance with his expertise as a linguist.

In May 1916, he left for Batavia and stayed for three months. At the end of August, he arrived at Makassar, boarding the ship to Palopo and then to Rantepao. Hendrik van der Veen arrived in Rantepao, Tana Toraja, on 11 September 1916, and was greeted by the family of van de Loosdrecht and Johannes Belksma. Van der Veen remained in Indonesia after its independence from the Netherlands in 1948 until ca. 1960, after which he returned to the Netherlands. On October 19, 1977, he died in Leusden at the age of 89.

== Hendrik van der Veen's Work in Tana Toraja ==
While in Tana Toraja, Van der Veen compiled biblical books for local schools, and began translating the Gospel of Luke into the Toraja language. This book became the first part of his translation of the New Testament, intended for use in Christmas meetings. Van der Veen also compiled a Toraja-Dutch dictionary, published in 1940; translated the Old Testament from 1947–1955; completed the entire translation of the Old Testament and the New Testament into the Toraja language, eventually known as Sura Madatu, and published in 1960; and began work on a Toraja-Indonesian dictionary. This dictionary was not completed by van der Veen, and ultimately continued by J. Tammu and L. Pakan.
