= Rossum =

Rossum may refer to:

== People ==
- Allen Rossum (born 1975), an American football cornerback and return specialist
- Emmy Rossum (born 1986), an American actress and singer-songwriter
- Kristin Rossum (born 1976), an American convicted of murdering her husband

== Places ==
- Rossum, Gelderland, town in Gelderland, the Netherlands
- Rossum, Overijssel, town in Overijssel, the Netherlands

== Fiction ==
- R.U.R. (Czech: Rossumovi Univerzální Roboti, English: Rossum's Universal Robots), a 1921 science fiction play by Karel Čapek
- Rossum Corporation, a fictional organization in the television series Dollhouse, named after R.U.R.

== See also ==
- Van Rossum, a surname
