= Van Rossum =

Van Rossum is a Dutch toponymic surname. Rossum could refer to a number of places, including Rossum, Gelderland, Rossum, Overijssel and Rossem in Flemish Brabant. People with this surname include:

- Eric van Rossum (born 1963), Dutch footballer
- Fredericus van Rossum du Chattel (1856–1917), Dutch landscape painter and etcher
- Frederik van Rossum (born 1939), Belgian composer and pianist
- Gerhard Dohrn-van Rossum (born 1947), German historian
- Guido van Rossum (born 1956), Dutch computer programmer and author of the Python programming language
- Henk van Rossum (1919–2017), Dutch Reformed Political Party politician
- Johannes van Rossum (1809–1873), Dutch partner of Princess Marianne of the Netherlands
- Just van Rossum (born 1966), Dutch typeface designer and computer programmer, brother of Guido
- Maarten van Rossum (1478–1555), Dutch (Guelders) warlord and later field marshal
- Willem Marinus van Rossum (1854–1932), Dutch Cardinal and Prefect of the Congregation for the Propagation of the Faith

== See also ==
- Rossum (disambiguation)
- Van Rossem, surname of the same origin
