= Julius Tiranda =

Sea captain from Indonesia (1936–2005)

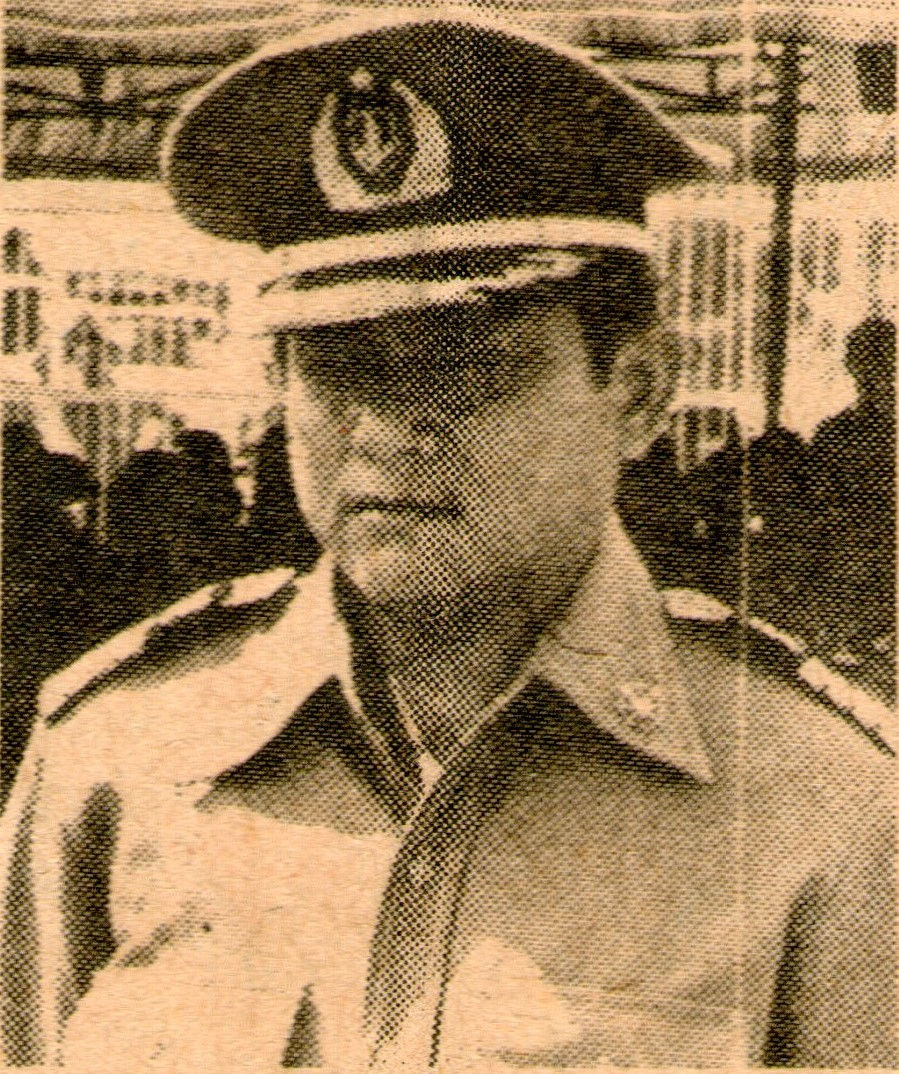
- Born: June 13, 1932; Pangala, Tana Toraja, Dutch East Indies
- Died: February 20, 2005 (aged 72)
- Spouse: Mrs. Tiranda
- Children: 3
- Military career
- Service years: 1959-1965
- Rank: Captain
- Commands: Nanggala Submarine

Julius Tiranda (October 13, 1936, in Makale, Tana Toraja, Dutch East Indies – February 20, 2005) is a sea captain from Indonesia of Torajan descent. He is renowned for his participation in a secret submarine mission by the government of Indonesia to send a submarine to Poland.

== Early life ==
Tiranda was born in Makale, Tana Toraja, Dutch East Indies, on October 13, 1936. He went to the Pangala Elementary School on 1945, the Torajan Junior High School on 1945. In 1950, he moved to Malang for the Malang Senior High School, on which he graduated from the school in 1953.

== Military career ==
Tiranda began his military career by studying at the Naval Academy in Surabaya for three years since 1954. After graduating in 1957, he was deployed in the Nanggala Submarine from 1959, and since 1964 he became the commander of the submarine.

He retired on 1965, when he was appointed as an assistant in the Coordinating Ministry for Maritime Affairs. He served there for a year, until he was later moved as the Head of the BPP Operation in Belawan. He moved again in 1974, when he was appointed as the port administrator for Palembang for 4 years, until he was finally appointed as the port administrator of Tanjung Priok in Jakarta, replacing Junus Effendi Habibie, on 16 February 1978.

== Religion ==
Tiranda was a Roman Catholic along with his wife.

== Death ==
Tiranda died on 20 February 2005 at his age on 72 and his bodies sent back to his hometown, Toraja for military funeral.

== Death Documentation ==
All Videos documentation is about the Death and Funeral Events for Capt. Julius Tiranda & Maj. Sgt. Samuel Popang.

Note: Majorities on these videos are Indonesian Language & Toraja-Ethnic Language, On Part 6 are Age-Restricted.

1. https://www.youtube.com/watch?v=tvS3yjjtXD4

2. https://www.youtube.com/watch?v=Blisidt7OpA

3. https://www.youtube.com/watch?v=0xYgJi-yu5o

4. https://www.youtube.com/watch?v=8F35UhATiGk

5. https://www.youtube.com/watch?v=5f6PN3nx_QU

6. https://youtube.com/watch?v=qXu9PQiaLyQ | https://www.nsfwyoutube.com/watchmore?v=qXu9PQiaLyQ

7. https://www.youtube.com/watch?v=TibZyiEIj40
