= Eva Stevany Rataba =

Indonesian activist and politician

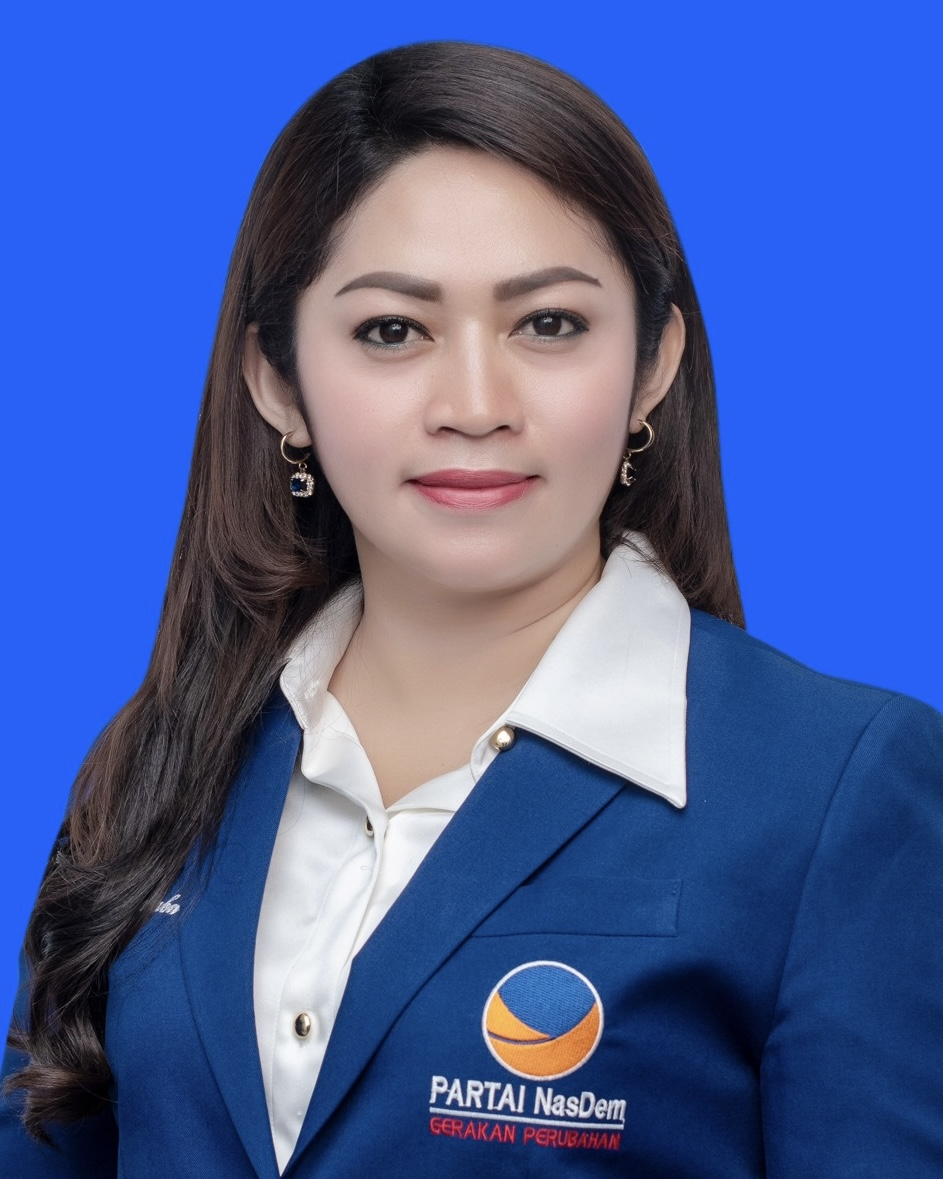
- Official portrait

Member of People's Representative Council
- Incumbent
- Assumed office 1 October 2019
- Constituency: South Sulawesi III

Personal details
- Born: Eva Stevany Rataba; 3 September 1982 (age 43) Rantepao, South Sulawesi, Indonesia
- Party: NasDem Party
- Spouse: Yosia Rinto Kadang

Eva Stevany Rataba (born 3 September 1982) is an Indonesian politician who has been a member of the House of Representatives (DPR) since 2019. Additionally, she is the 2019–2022 Head of the North Toraja Regency, Indonesian Early Childhood Education and Education Association (Himpaudi).

== Biography ==
=== Early education ===
Eva obtained her early education at SD Kristen Rantepao from 1988 to 1994; SMP Negeri 2 Rantepao from 1994 to 1997; and SMA Negeri 1 Rantepao from 1997 to 2000.

=== Political career ===
Eva began to hold several notable positions such as deputy chairman of TP PKK North Toraja Regency from 2016 to 2021; deputy chairman of Dekranasda North Toraja Regency from 2016 to 2021; and member of the DPR-RI since 2019. She ran in the South Sulawesi III electoral district of the 2019 Legislative Election and received 44,240 votes.

On 23 February 2021, Eva delivered help for the purchase of auxiliary devices to three primary schools in North Toraja, each through the Ministry of Education and Culture of the Republic of Indonesia, based on information and communication technology (ICT) aspirational route. According to her, all industries, including education, were in need of human resources who are proficient in information and communication technologies.

Eva ceremoniously gave thousands of scholarship funds for the Smart Indonesia Program (PIP) Aspiration Path to a number of schools in the East Luwu Regency on 8 March 2023. The transfer of power was symbolic and took place at UPT SMA Negeri 5 East Luwu. She hopes to use this help for academic needs.

Later on 16 October, a U-25 futsal competition called the ESR Cup 2023 was organized by Eva. Commission X DPR, the Sangtiangkaran Student Association, and Eva collaborated with the Ministry of Youth and Sports to organize the ESR Cup 2023 (IMSAT). During her remarks, she expressed her gratitude for the tournament's ability to serve as a healthy exercise venue and a means of identifying potential futsal athletes in North Toraja.

=== Activism ===
In order to organise education in the nation, Eva delivered a message to the Ministry of Education, Culture, Research, and Technology, stating that, the issue of national education remains unchanged from year to year. Limited access, inequity, poor quality teachers, irrelevant curriculum, inadequate learning support facilities, digital gaps, and test and evaluation quality are a few of these. She underlined that Indonesian education requires a dynamic and flexible curriculum. The needs must be taken into account while adjusting teacher competency, particularly in the 3T region (outside, trailing behind, leading).

== Personal life ==
Eva plays a crucial role as the Head of the Women's Guard (Garnita) Malahayati NasDem Party of North Toraja Regency in addition to helping her husband, Yosia Rinto Sometimes, who holds the position of Deputy Regent of North Toraja and works to develop the region. Together with her husband, they have 3 children.

== Electoral history ==
| Election | Legislative institution | Constituency | Political party | Votes | Results |
|---|---|---|---|---|---|
| 2019 | People's Representative Council of the Republic of Indonesia | South Sulawesi III | NasDem Party | 44,240 | Elected |
