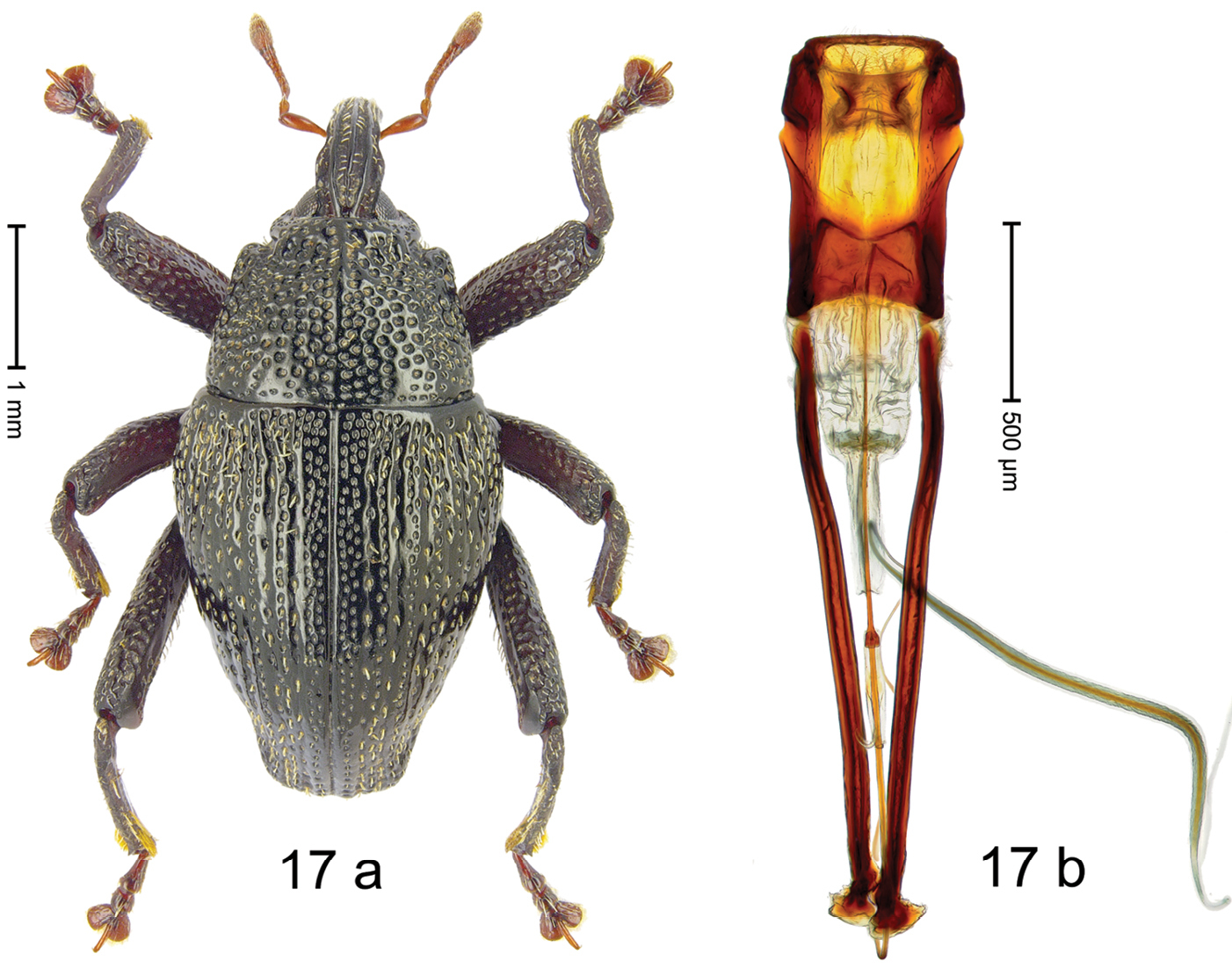

Scientific classification
- Kingdom: Animalia
- Phylum: Arthropoda
- Clade: Pancrustacea
- Class: Insecta
- Order: Coleoptera
- Suborder: Polyphaga
- Infraorder: Cucujiformia
- Family: Curculionidae
- Genus: Trigonopterus
- Species: T. collaris

Binomial name
- Trigonopterus collaris Riedel, 2019

= Trigonopterus collaris =

Beetle species native to Indonesia

Trigonopterus collaris is a species of flightless weevil in the genus Trigonopterus from Indonesia. The species was described in May 2019. The beetle is 4.08–4.40 mm long. It has dark reddish-brown antennae and tarsi, while the rest of the body is black with a slight bronze sheen. The weevil is endemic to South Sulawesi, where it is found in the leaf litter of montane forests at elevations of 1100–1420 m.

== Taxonomy ==
Trigonopterus collaris was described by the entomologist Alexander Riedel in 2019 on the basis of an adult male specimen collected from Tana Toraja in South Sulawesi, Indonesia. The specific epithet is derived from the Latin collaris and refers to the species' subapically constricted pronotum.

== Description ==
The beetle is 4.08–4.40 mm long. It has dark reddish-brown antennae and tarsi, while the rest of the body is black with a slight bronze sheen. The body is somewhat oval in shape, with a noticeable narrowing between the pronotum and the elytra when viewed from above, and it appears convex from the side. The rostrum features a central ridge and two submedian ridges that converge toward the forehead. The grooves between these ridges each contain a sparse row of upright piliform scales. The epistome is not clearly defined and has a few scattered punctures.

The pronotum narrows slightly along straight sides toward a distinct constriction near the front. Its surface is densely covered with coarse, net-like punctures and has a raised central ridge, along with a few flat, narrow scales. The elytra have striae marked by faint lines and scattered coarse punctures. The area near the suture and the humerus is densely punctured. Intervals 2 through 7 each have a single row of punctures, and the surface is scattered with flat, narrow scales.

The front femur has a simple ridge on the underside ending in a small blunt tooth. The middle and hind femora have ridged undersides with a crenate edge, ending in a small sharp tooth. Their front surfaces are densely punctured, with each puncture bearing a flat, narrow scale. The hind femur also has a weakly scalloped upper rear edge and a stridulatory patch near the tip. The back surface of the hind tibia is mostly smooth with a few scattered hairs, though some may be worn off. The first two abdominal segments are slightly sunken in the middle and mostly smooth, with a few upright scales on the sides. The fifth segment is flat, coarsely punctured, and covered with dense, upright hairs.

The penis has nearly parallel sides, with slight narrowing in the middle and near the tip. The tip is somewhat angular and has a few scattered hairs. The apodemes are 2.2 times the length of the penis body. The transfer apparatus is flagelliform and 1.4 times longer than the penis. The ductus ejaculatorius is hardened at the base and contains a clearly defined bulb.

== Distribution ==
Found in leaf litter of montane forests in South Sulawesi at elevations of 1100–1420 m.
