= Patrick Bosch =

Dutch footballer

Personal information
- Date of birth: 30 October 1964
- Place of birth: Rossum, Netherlands
- Date of death: 11 May 2012 (aged 47)
- Place of death: Denekamp, Netherlands
- Position: Defender

Youth career
- RSC Rossum

Senior career*
Years	Team	Apps	(Gls)
1984–1989	FC Twente	122	(0)
1989–1993	Emmen	122	(3)
Total		244	(3)
- * Club domestic league appearances and goals as of 12 May 2012 ‡ National team caps and goals as of 12 May 2012

Patrick Bosch (30 October 1964 – 11 May 2012) was a Dutch football player.

== Club career ==
Usually played at rightback, Bosch made his professional Eredivisie debut for FC Twente in a March 1985 league match against FC Utrecht. He would go on to play 5 years for Twente before moving to Eerste Divisie club FC Emmen in 1989. He joined amateur side Stevo after leaving Emmen in 1993 and won the 1994 Dutch amateur league title with them.

== Death ==
Bosch died from injuries sustained after his car came off the road on his way home and overturned on the 11 May 2012. He was 47 years old.
