= Van Rossem =

van Rossem is a surname. Notable people with the surname include:

- Adriaan Joseph van Rossem (1892–1949), American ornithologist
- Daniëlle van Rossem (born 1935), Dutch fencer
- George van Rossem (1882–1955), Dutch fencer
- Jean-Pierre Van Rossem (1945–2018), Belgian politician and writer
- Maarten van Rossem (born 1943), Dutch historian
- Metejoor (born 1991), Belgian singer born Joris Van Rossem

== See also ==
- van Rossum, surname of similar Dutch origin
- Dutch names
