= Antonie Aris van de Loosdrecht =

Dutch missionary

Antonie Aris van de Loosdrecht (1 March 1885, Veenendaal – 26 July 1917, Tana Toraja) was a Dutch missionary. He was sent by Gereformeerde Zendingsbond, a Christian missionary agency which was established in the Netherlands.

Antonie Aris van de Loosdrecht was sent by Gereformeerde Zendingsbond to work in the Dutch East Indies. He was the first missionary who arrived in Tana Toraja, South Sulawesi, Dutch East Indies, where he built many schools. He also wrote books in the ethnic Toraja language for the students. He also requested that fellow Dutch missionary Hendrik van der Veen be sent to Tana Toraja.
