= Jesus Buntu Burake =

Statue in South Sulawesi, Indonesia

Coordinates: 3.092400°S 119.869700°E

- Patung Yesus Kristus Memberkati
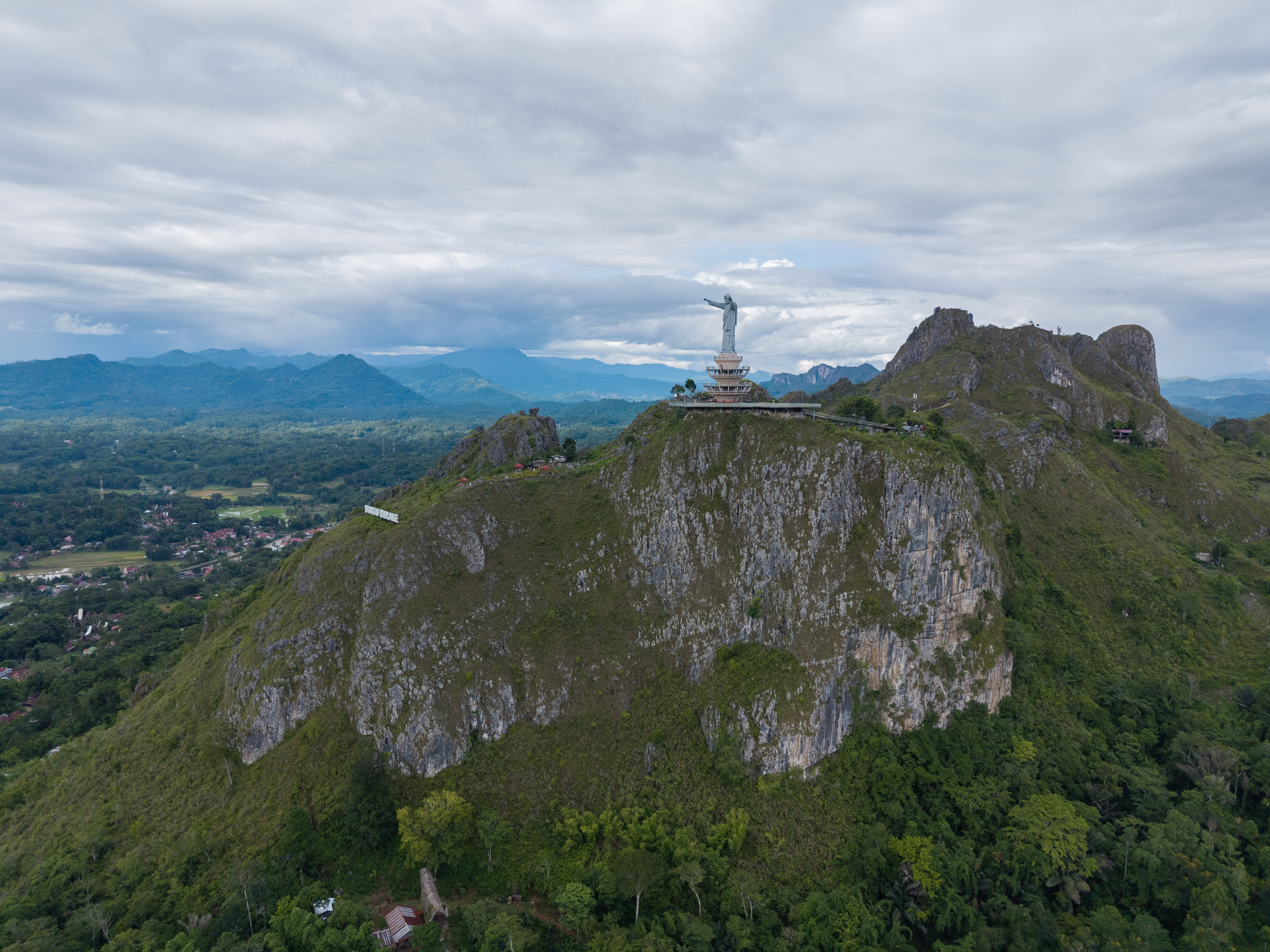
- Jesus Buntu Burake in Makale

Religion
- Affiliation: Catholicism

Location
- Location: Makale, Tana Toraja Regency, South Sulawesi
- Interactive map of Jesus Buntu Burake

Architecture
- Architects: Supriadi and Hardo Wardoyo Suwarto
- Type: Statue
- Groundbreaking: 2014
- Completed: 2015

Specifications
- Height (max): Statue: 23 metres (75 ft); Including base: 40 metres (130 ft)
- Materials: Bronze

Jesus Buntu Burake (Indonesian: Patung Yesus Kristus Memberkati, "Statue of Jesus Christ Blessing") is a Roman Catholic statue of Jesus Christ located in Makale the capital of Tana Toraja Regency, South Sulawesi, Indonesia. It is one of the tallest statues of Jesus Christ in the world, standing at approximately 40 m (130 ft) tall. It stands on the top of Buntu Burake hill about 1.700 metres above sea level. Jesus Buntu Burake also has a glass viewing platform at its base.

== History ==
At the request of the governor of South Sulawesi, Syahrul Yasin Limpo, in order to promote tourism in Tana Toraja, a competition was held in 2013 to design a statue, which was open to the general public. After obtaining the winner, in 2013 the foundation of the statue began to be built. The winning design was created by Supriadi, an artist from Yogyakarta, with the support of Hardo Wardoyo Suwarto. The construction of the statue itself was started in 2013, and completed in 2015. It was constructed from cast bronze. The statue also has a glass viewing bridge at the base. The official inauguration was held on 23 December 2018, by President Joko Widodo as declared on the inauguration inscription, and was celebrated as part of the Tana Toraja Oikumene Christmas celebration.

The construction of the base of the statue cost 5.8 billion Rp, and the statue itself 22 billion Rp, funded by the governor of Sulawesi to promote tourism in the area.

== See also ==
- List of statues of Jesus
- List of tallest statues
