= North Toraja Regency =

Regency in South Sulawesi, Indonesia

North Toraja Regency Kabupaten Toraja Utara
- Regency
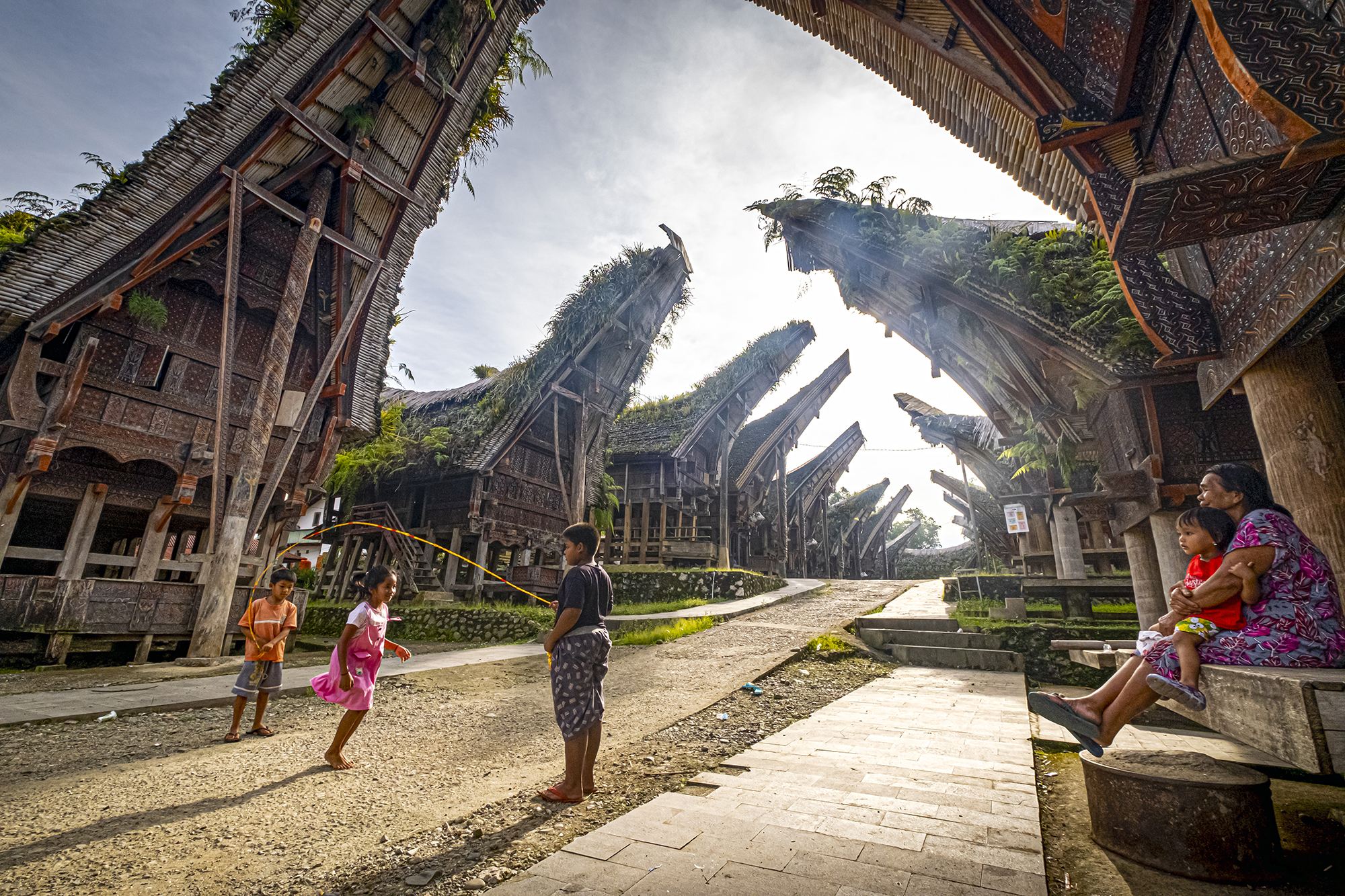
- Tongkonan house in North Toraja

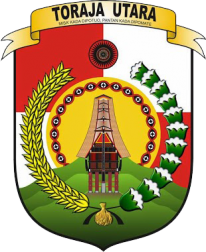
- Coat of arms

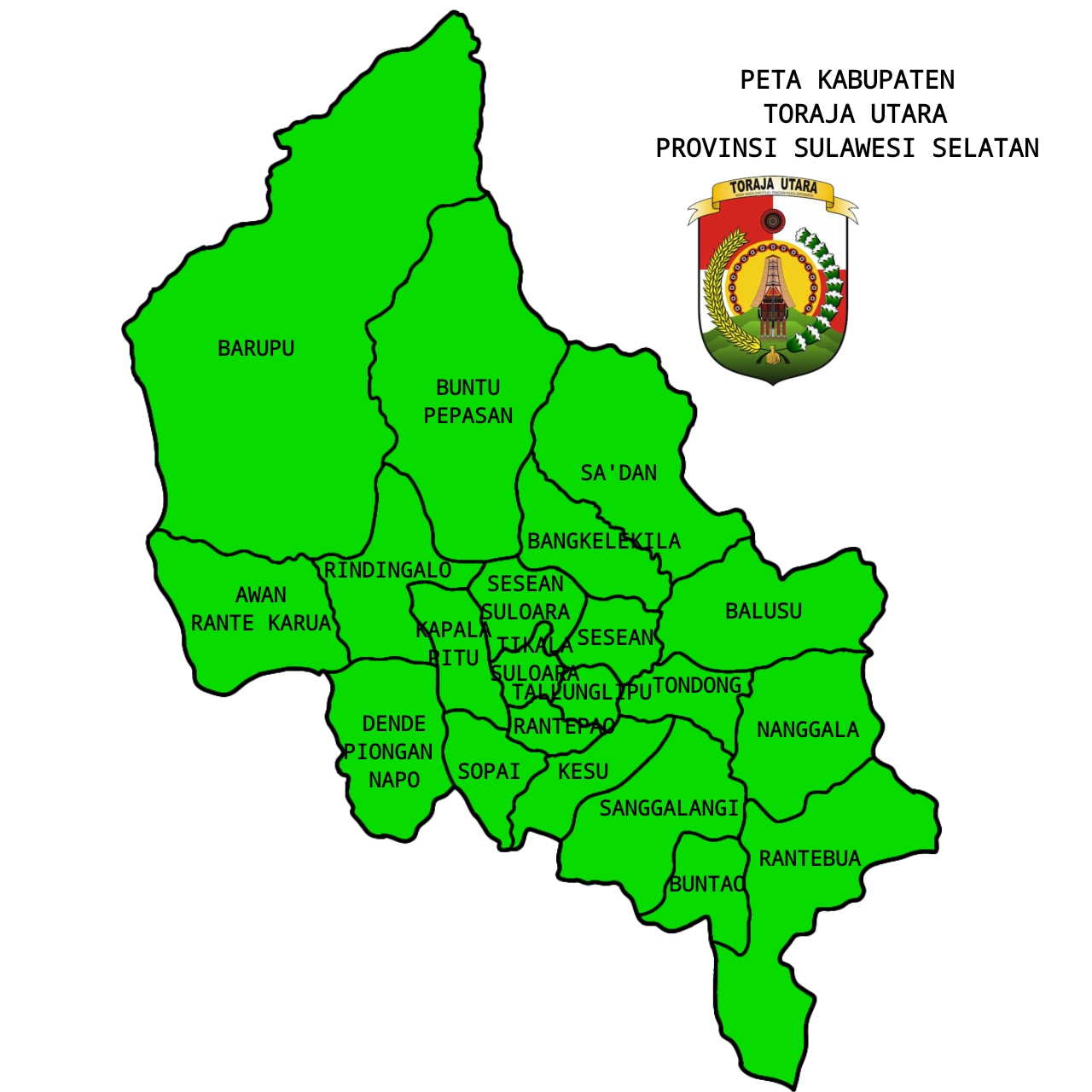
- Location of districts within North Toraja Regency
- Country: Indonesia
- Province: South Sulawesi
- Capital: Rantepao

Government
  - Regent: Frederik Victor Palimbong
  - Vice Regent: Andrew Branch Silambi

Area
  - Total: 1,151.47 km^{2} (444.59 sq mi)

Population (mid 2025 estimate)
  - Total: 268,717
  - Density: 233.369/km^{2} (604.422/sq mi)
- Time zone: UTC+8 (WITA)

North Toraja (or Toraja Utara) is a landlocked regency (kabupaten) of South Sulawesi Province of Indonesia, and the home of the Toraja ethnic group. The local government seat is in Rantepao which is also the centre of Toraja culture. Formerly this regency was the northeastern part of the existing Tana Toraja Regency, but on 24 June 2008 this northeastern 36% of the area was split off to form this separate North Toraja Regency. It covers an area of 1,151.47 km^{2} and had a population of 216,762 at the 2010 census and 261,086 at the 2020 census; the official estimate as at mid 2025 was 268,717 (comprising 137,047 males and 131,670 females).

The Tana Toraja boundary was determined by the Dutch East Indies government in 1909. In 1926, Tana Toraja was under the administration of Bugis state of Luwu. The regentschap (or regency) status was given on 8 October 1946, the last regency given by the Dutch. Since 1984, Tana Toraja has been named as the second tourist destination after Bali by the Ministry of Tourism, Indonesia. Since then, hundreds of thousands of foreign visitors have visited this regency. In addition, numerous Western anthropologists have come to Tana Toraja to study the indigenous Torajan people and their culture.

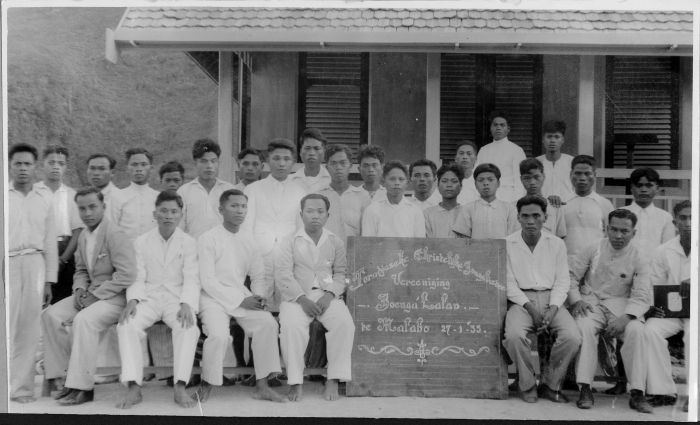
Christian mission in Tana Toraja Regency, Netherlands colonial period. picture credits : Tropenmuseum.

== Geography ==
Tana Toraja is located on the island of Sulawesi, 300 km north of Makassar, the provincial capital of South Sulawesi. Its geographical location is between latitude of 2°-3° South and longitude 119°-120° East (centre: 3°S 120°E). The area of the North Toraja Regency is 1,151.47 km^{2}, about 2.54% of the total area of South Sulawesi province. The topography of Tana Toraja is mountainous; its minimum elevation is 150 metres, while the maximum is 3,083 above the sea level.

== Administrative districts ==
North Toraja Regency comprises twenty-one administrative Districts (Kecamatan), tabulated below with their areas and their populations at the 2010 census and the 2020 census, together with the official estimates as at mid 2025. The table also includes the locations of the district administrative centres, the number of administrative villages in each district (totaling 110 rural villages - formerly called desa, now called lembang - and 40 urban villages or towns, called kelurahan), and their post codes.

Kode Wilayah	Name of District (kecamatan)	Area in km^{2}	Pop'n census 2010	Pop'n census 2020	Pop'n estimate mid 2025	Admin centre	No. of villages	Post code
73.26.08	Sopai	47.64	13,042	15,687	16,623	Nonongan Selatan	8 ^{(a)}	91850
73.26.15	Kesu	26.00	15,504	19,150	20,137	Ba'tan	7 ^{(b)}	91852
73.26.17	Sanggalangi	39.00	11,129	13,218	14,125	Buntu La'bo	6 ^{(c)}	91851
73.26.05	Buntao	49.50	8,911	11,443	11,456	Misa Ba'bana	6 ^{(d)}	91841
73.26.18	Rantebua	84.84	7,595	8,989	9,038	Buangin	7 ^{(e)}	91842
73.26.03	Nanggala	68.00	9,192	10,376	10,357	Nanggah Sangpiak Salu	9 ^{(f)}	91856
73.26.16	Tondon	36.00	9,465	12,529	12,332	Tondon Langi	4	91857
73.26.11	Tallunglipu	9.42	18,068	20,644	20,681	Tallunglipu	7 ^{(g)}	91832
73.26.01	Rantepao	10.29	25,585	28,451	29,063	Singki	11 ^{(h)}	91835 ^{(i)}
73.26.09	Tikala	23.44	10,275	12,342	13,012	Buntu Barana	7 ^{(j)}	91833
73.26.02	Sesean	40.05	10,893	13,319	13,599	Pangli	9 ^{(k)}	91844
73.26.10	Balusu	46.51	6,760	7,983	8,459	Balusu	7 ^{(m)}	91855
73.26.06	Sa'dan	80.49	14,923	18,722	19,633	Satlan Malimbong	10 ^{(n)}	91843
73.26.17	Bangkelekila	21.00	5,128	8,525	8,110	Tampan Bonga	4	91853
73.26.19	Sesean Suloara'	21.68	6,236	6,943	7,340	Suloara	5	91845
73.26.20	Kapala Pitu	47.27	6,041	6,982	7,479	Polo Padang	6	91848
73.26.12	Dende' Piongan Napo	77.49	7,979	9,046	9,333	Dende	8 ^{(p)}	91822
73.26.21	Awan Rante Karua	54.71	5,195	5,634	6,080	Awan	4	91854
73.26.04	Rindingallo	74.25	7,255	9,070	9,490	Pangala	9 ^{(r)}	91849
73.26.13	Buntu Pepasan	131.72	12,228	14,582	15,015	Sapan	13 ^{(s)}	91847
73.26.14	Baruppu	162.17	5,358	7,451	7,355	Baruppu Selatan	4 ^{(t)}	91846
	Totals	1,151.47	216,762	261,086	268,717	Rantepao	150	

Notes: (a) including the kelurahan of Nonangan Utara. (b) including the 2 kelurahan of Ba'tan and Pantanakan Lolo.
(c) including the kelurahan of Paepalean. (d) including the 2 kelurahan of Tongkonan Bassae and Tullang' Sura.
(e) including the 2 kelurahan of Bokin and Buangin. (f) including the kelurahan of Nanggala Sanpiak Salu.
(g) comprising the 6 kelurahan of Rantepaku Tallunglipu, Tagari Tallunglipu, Tallunglipu, Tallunglipu Matalo, Tampo Tallunglipu and Tantanan Tallunglipu, plus one desa (Buntu Tallunglipu).
(h) comprising the 9 kelurahan of Karassik, Laang Tanduk, Malangngo', Mentirotiku, Pasale, Penanian, Rante Pasele, Rantepao and Singki', plus 2 desa.
(i) except the kelurahan of Rantepao, Malangngo' and Pasale (which share a post code of 91831), and Mentirotiku and Laang Tanduk (which share a post code of 91834).
(j) including the 2 kelurahan of Buntu Barana and Tikala. (k) comprising the 5 kelurahan of Bori', Deri', Palawa', Pangli and Pangli Selatan, plus 4 desa.
(m) including the 2 kelurahan of Balusu and Tagari. (n) including the 2 kelurahan of Sa'dan Malimbong and Sa'dan Matallo.
(p) including the kelurahan of Pasang. (r) including the 2 kelurahan of Pangala' and Pangala' Utara,
(s) including the kelurahan of Sapan. (t) including the kelurahan of Baruppu Selatan.

== See also ==
- List of regencies and cities of Indonesia
