= Rantepao =

District in South Sulawesi, Indonesia

Coordinates: 2.969°S 119.9°E

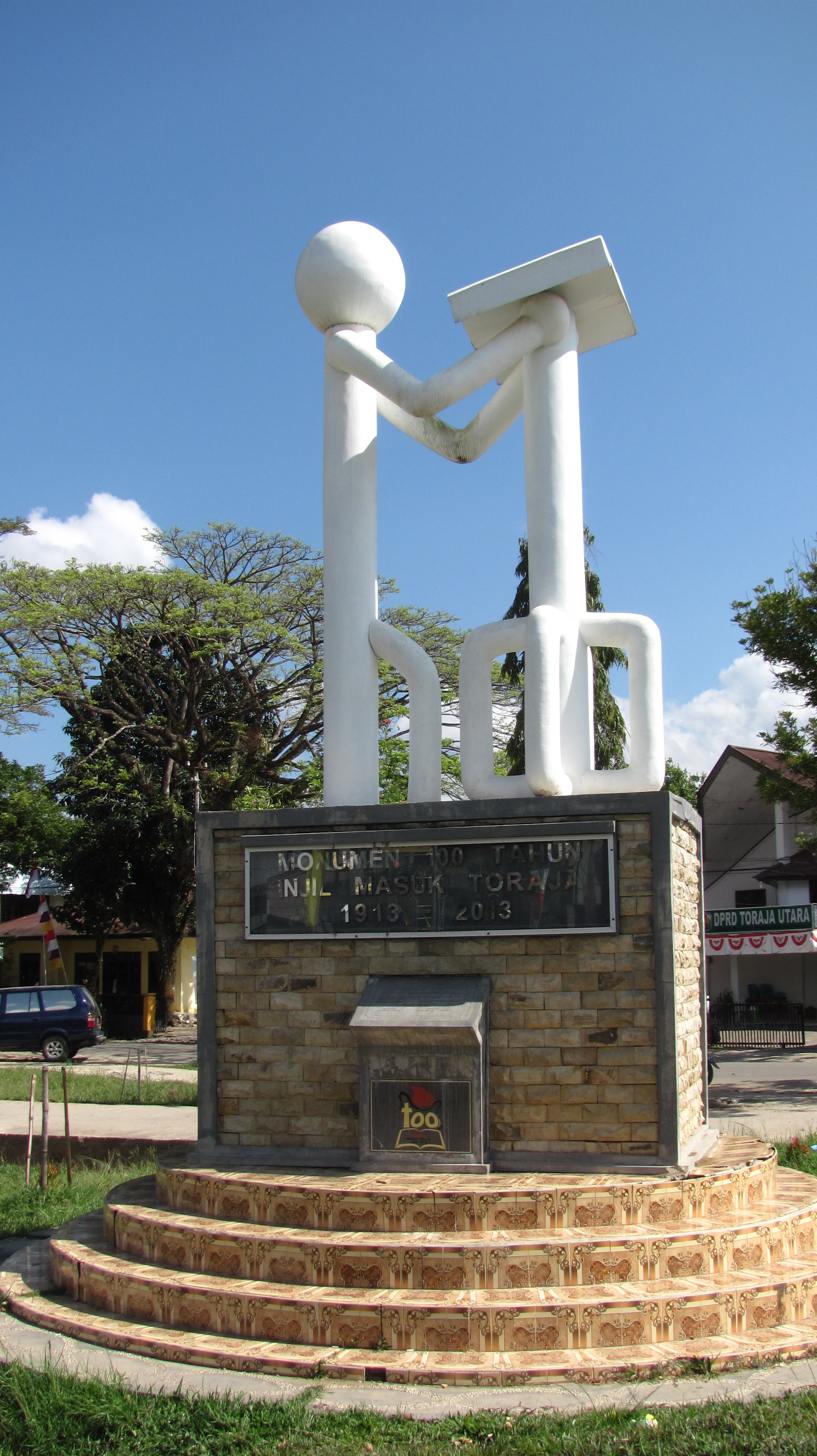
Bible monument in Rantepao

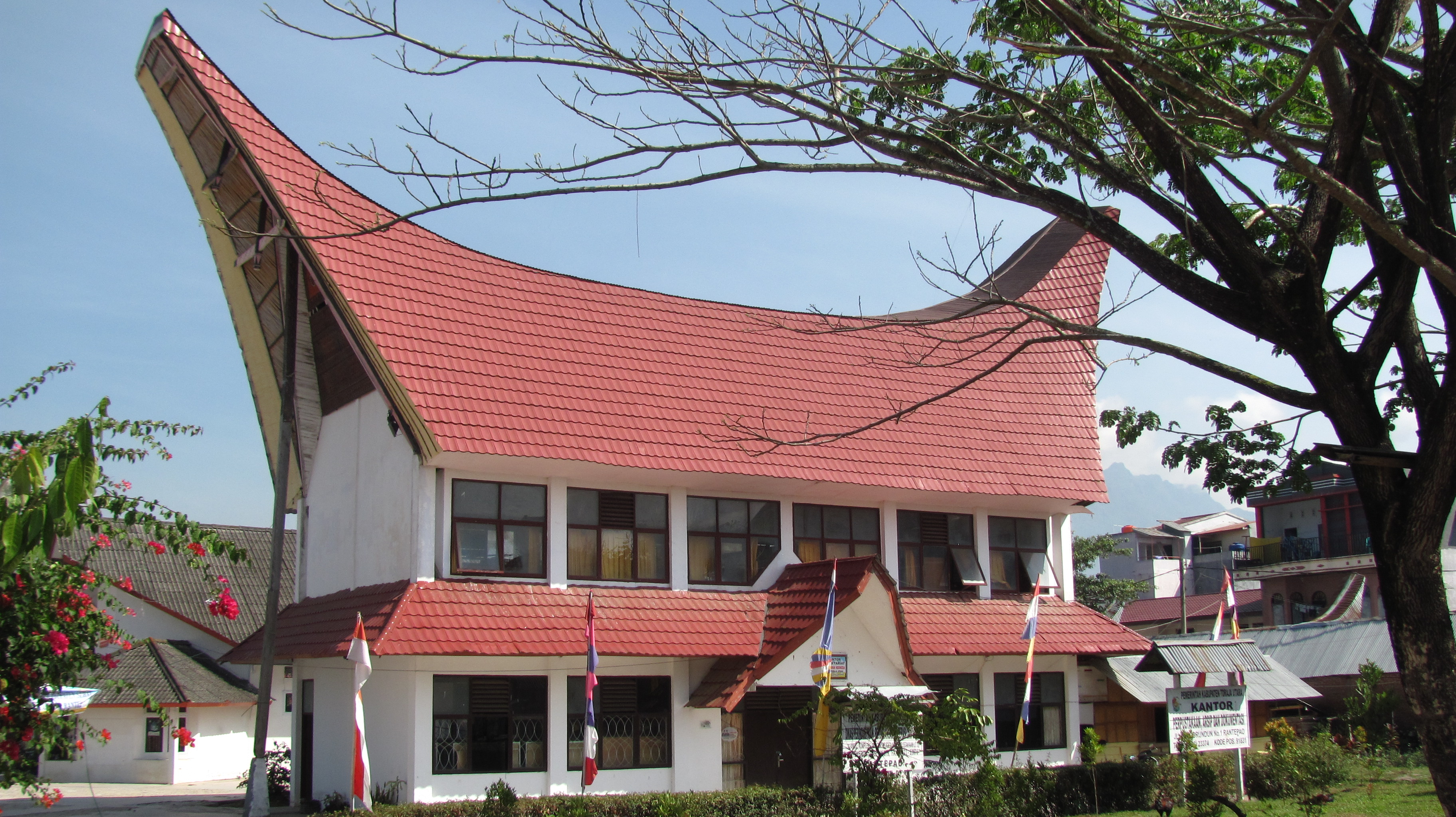
Administration building in Rantepao

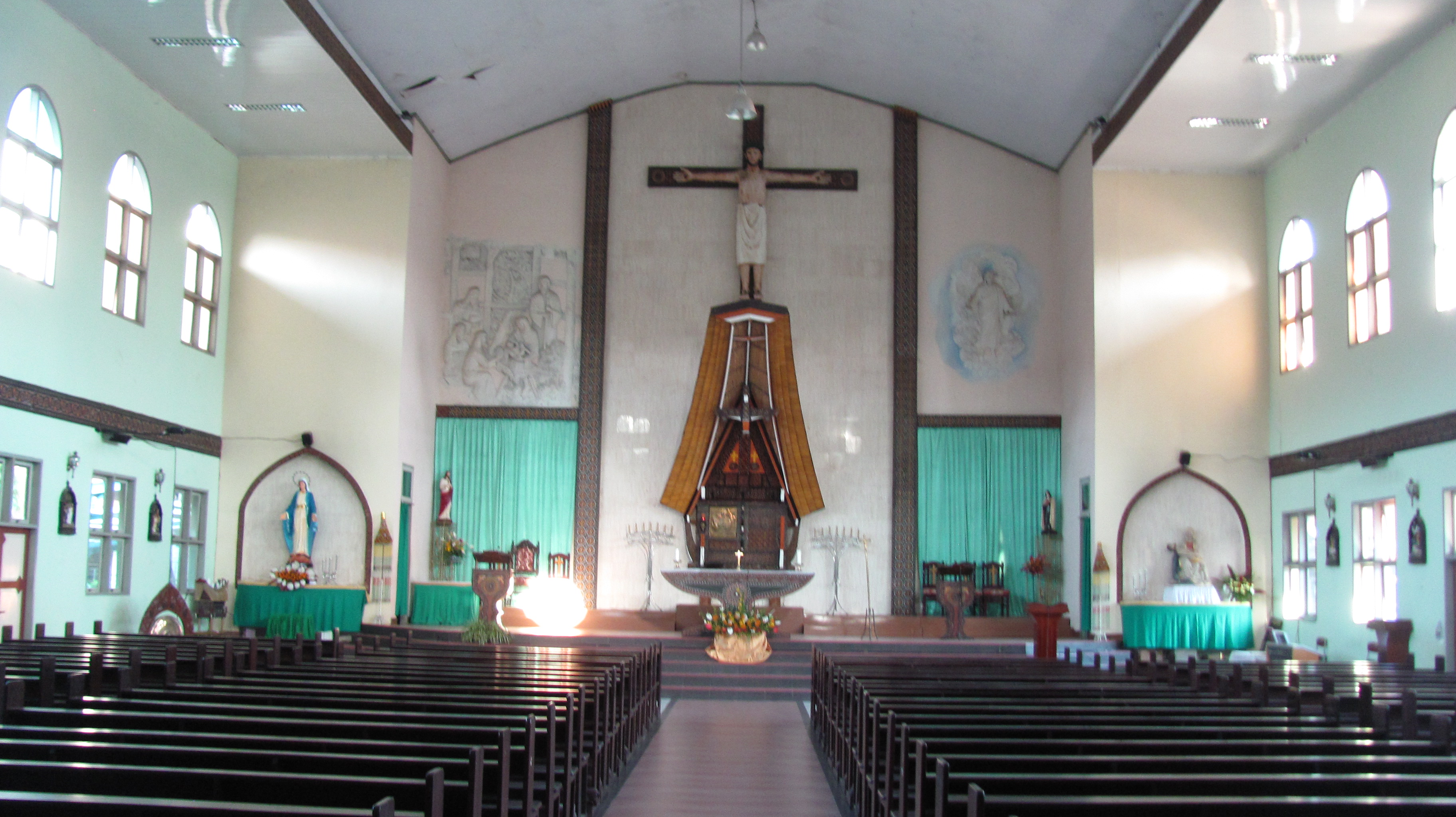
Santa Theresia Church in Rantepao

Rantepao is a town and the capital of North Toraja Regency, Indonesia, which is the cultural center of the Toraja ethnic group. National and regional tourism offices have developed the city as the starting point for visiting Tana Toraja, since the area was opened for tourism in the 1970s.

Rantepao has a significant population of Torajan Muslims.

== History ==
In 1961, the government administration in the Tana Toraja underwent a change. This change occurred due to the issuance of the Letter of the Governor of the Level I Region of South Sulawesi No. 2067 A. In this letter, Tana Toraja Regency which originally consisted of 15 districts with a total of 410 villages changed to consist of 9 sub-districts with 135 villages. One of the districts formed was Rantepao District. Then the formation of a new style village was held through the Governor's Decree of the Head of the Level I Region of South Sulawesi No. 450/XII/1965. This decree was issued on December 20, 1965.

Based on the decree, the Decree of the Head of the Second Level Region of Tana Toraja was stipulated again No. 152/SP/1967. Issuance of this letter on September 7, 1967 and its contents regarding the formation of the new style village. A total of 65 new style villages were designated in the Tana Toraja Regency Level II Region. These villages are then divided into 186 villages. In this decree, Rantepao District is divided into 4 sub-district and 18 villages.

Rantepao District has been part of North Toraja Regency since the formation of this district in 2008. Its formation was stipulated by Law of the Republic of Indonesia No. 28 of 2008. Rantepao District before becoming part of North Toraja Regency, including the Tana Toraja Regency. This is because part of the Tana Toraja Regency area was divided into North Toraja Regency. Rantepao District is one of the districts in North Toraja Regency which is located in the central part to the south. The dominant altitude in Rantepao District is between 500–1000 meters above sea level.

== Geography ==
Rantepao has 43,123 inhabitants (census 2010). The town is on river Sadang, about 300 km north-east from Makassar.

=== Climate ===
Rantepao has an elevation moderated tropical rainforest climate (Af) with heavy to very heavy rainfall year-round.

Climate data for Rantepao
Month	Jan	Feb	Mar	Apr	May	Jun	Jul	Aug	Sep	Oct	Nov	Dec	Year
Mean daily maximum °C (°F)	26.3 (79.3)	26.6 (79.9)	26.8 (80.2)	26.8 (80.2)	26.6 (79.9)	25.9 (78.6)	25.4 (77.7)	26.4 (79.5)	27.0 (80.6)	28.1 (82.6)	27.4 (81.3)	26.6 (79.9)	26.7 (80.0)
Daily mean °C (°F)	22.5 (72.5)	22.8 (73.0)	22.9 (73.2)	22.9 (73.2)	22.9 (73.2)	22.3 (72.1)	21.6 (70.9)	22.1 (71.8)	22.4 (72.3)	23.4 (74.1)	23.2 (73.8)	22.7 (72.9)	22.6 (72.7)
Mean daily minimum °C (°F)	18.8 (65.8)	19.0 (66.2)	19.0 (66.2)	19.0 (66.2)	19.3 (66.7)	18.7 (65.7)	17.8 (64.0)	17.9 (64.2)	17.9 (64.2)	18.7 (65.7)	19.0 (66.2)	18.9 (66.0)	18.7 (65.6)
Average precipitation mm (inches)	320 (12.6)	337 (13.3)	366 (14.4)	469 (18.5)	289 (11.4)	202 (8.0)	171 (6.7)	160 (6.3)	141 (5.6)	169 (6.7)	308 (12.1)	381 (15.0)	3,313 (130.6)
Source: Climate-Data.org

== Notable sites ==
A monument 10 metres high near the market in the centre of Rantepao dedicated to Pong Tiku. Pong Tiku was a rebel fighting against the Dutch at the beginning of the 20th century. He was condemned to death in Rantepao in 1907.

Mount Gunung Singki west of the town centre is 930 metres high.

== Surroundings ==
Ke'te Kesu is a village in the south of Rantepoao which has a cave with several graves, five large tongkonans and a dozen storehouses (alang).

== Notable people ==
- Eva Stevany Rataba (born 1982), activist and politician
