= Rossum, Overijssel =

Rossum
- village
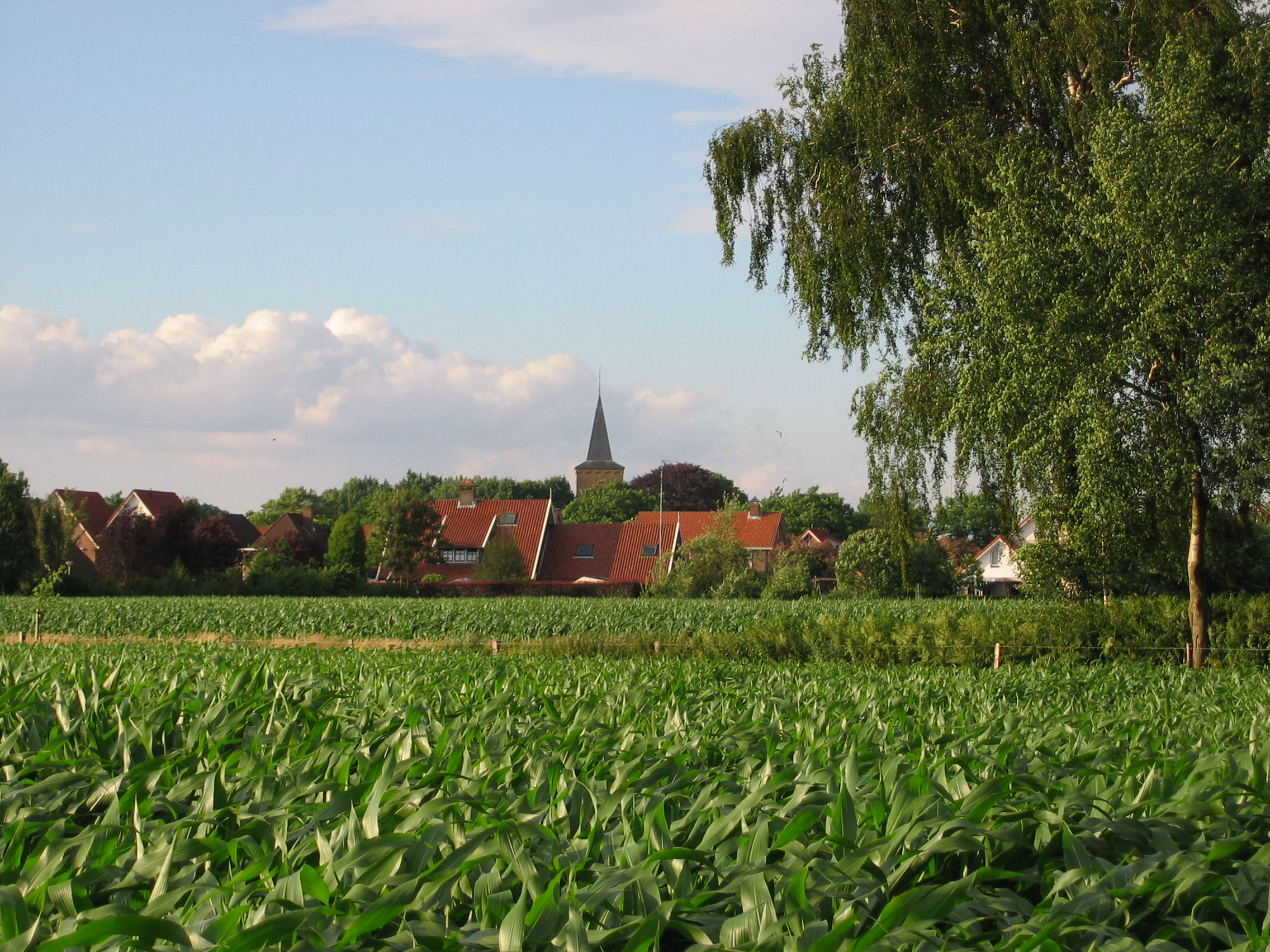
- view of Rossum
- Nicknames: Göttenkeurndoarp, Görtekeurne
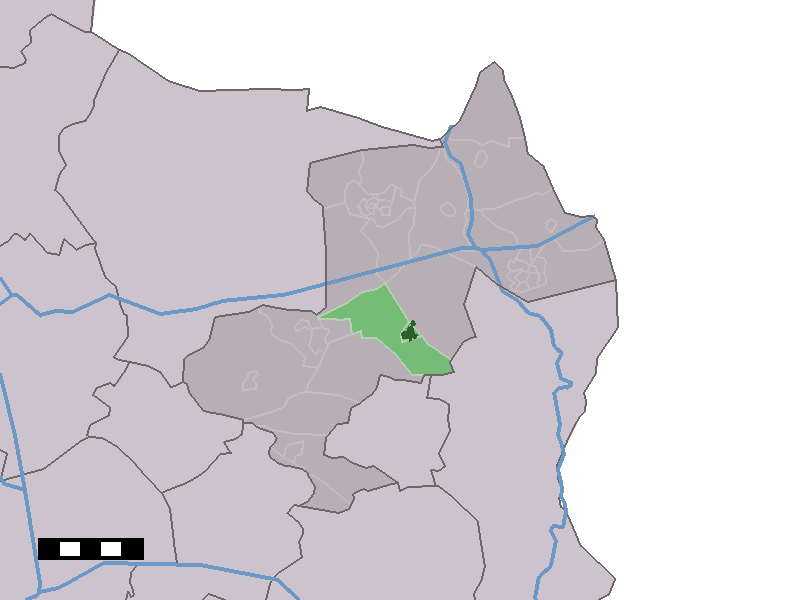
- The village centre (dark green) and the statistical district (light green) of Rossum in the municipality of Dinkelland.

- Location in the Netherlands Rossum (Netherlands)
- Coordinates: 52°21′8″N 6°55′23″E
- Country: Netherlands
- Province: Overijssel
- Municipality: Dinkelland

Area
  - Total: 25.76 km^{2} (9.95 sq mi)
- Elevation: 25 m (82 ft)

Population (2021)
  - Total: 2,355
  - Density: 91.42/km^{2} (236.8/sq mi)
- Demonym: Rossumers
- Time zone: UTC+1 (CET)
  - Summer (DST): UTC+2 (CEST)
- Postal code: 7596
- Dialing code: 0541

Rossum is a village in the Dutch province of Overijssel. It is a part of the municipality of Dinkelland, and lies about 4 km north of Oldenzaal on the road to Ootmarsum.

It was first mentioned in the late-10th century as Rohthem, and means "settlement near cleared forest". In 1840, it was home to 504 people.

The Hunenborg is a circular rampart to the north of Rossum. In 1916, remnants of wooden buildings were discovered at the site. Later a wooden dam dating from the 1150s was uncovered, and may be the location of a 10th century fortress of the Prince-Bishop of Utrecht.

In the rural environment some farms can be found in the traditional building style of the timber framed Low German house.

== Notable people ==
- Patrick Bosch (1964–2012), football player

== Gallery ==
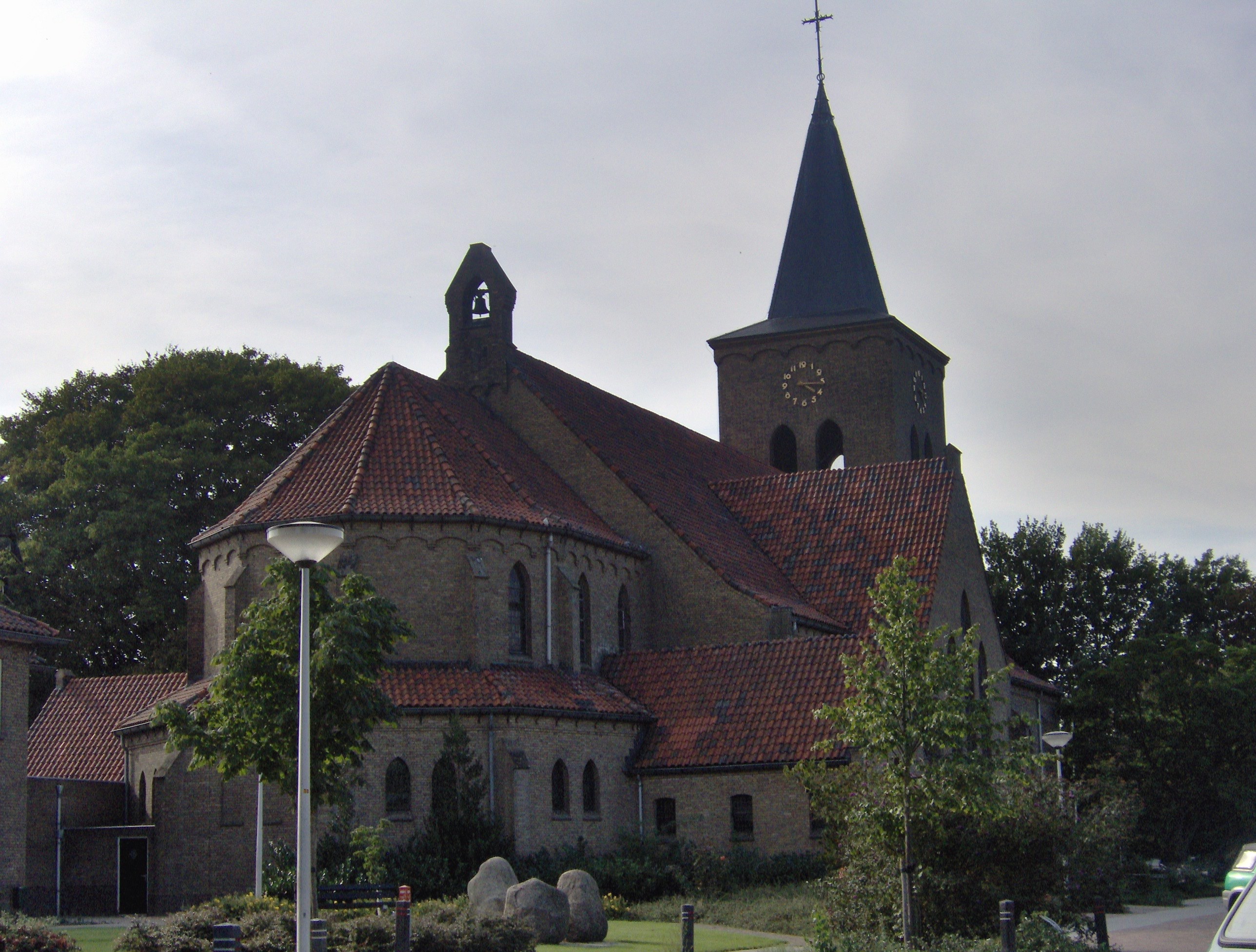
St. Plechelmus church

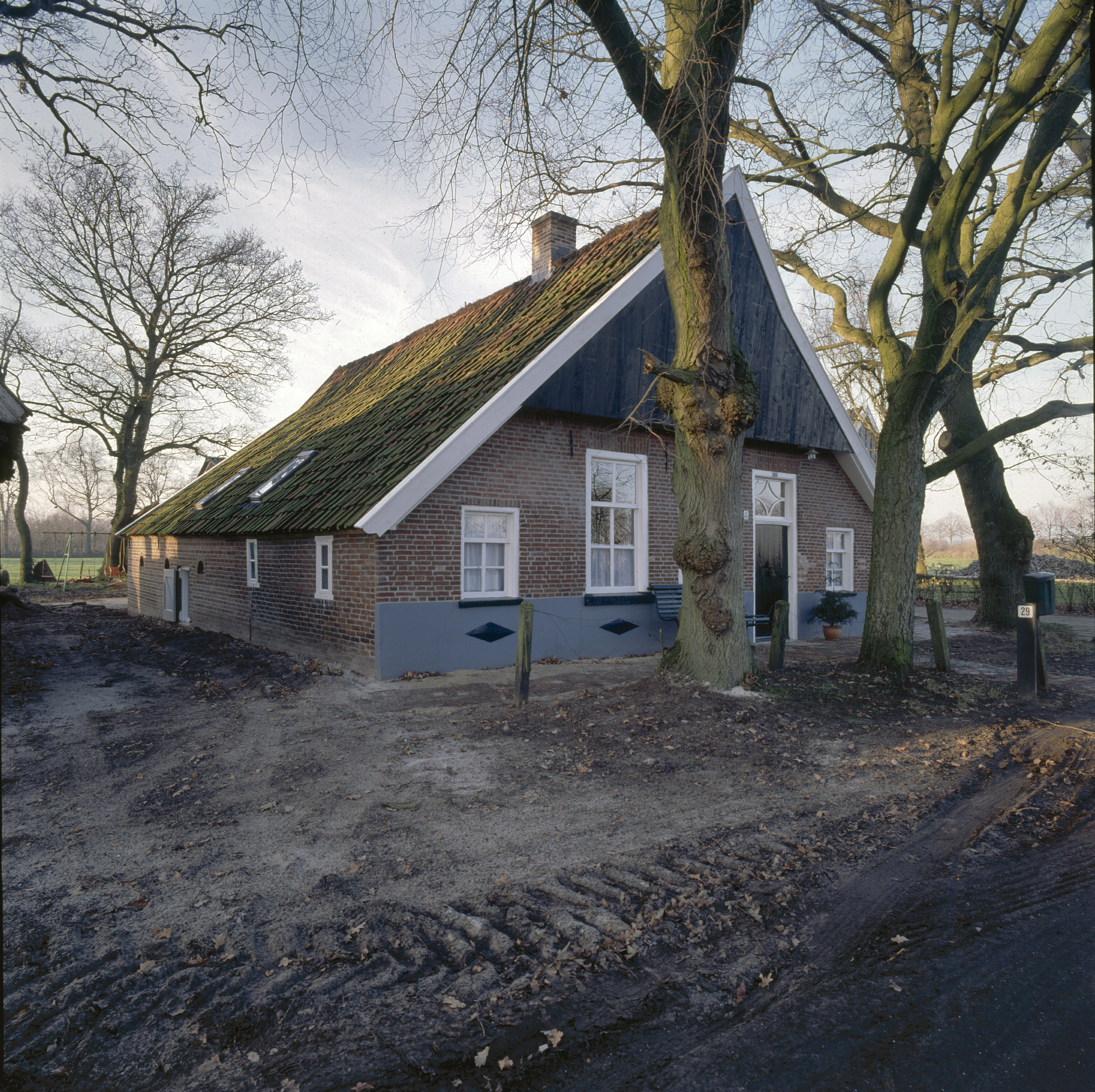
Low German house

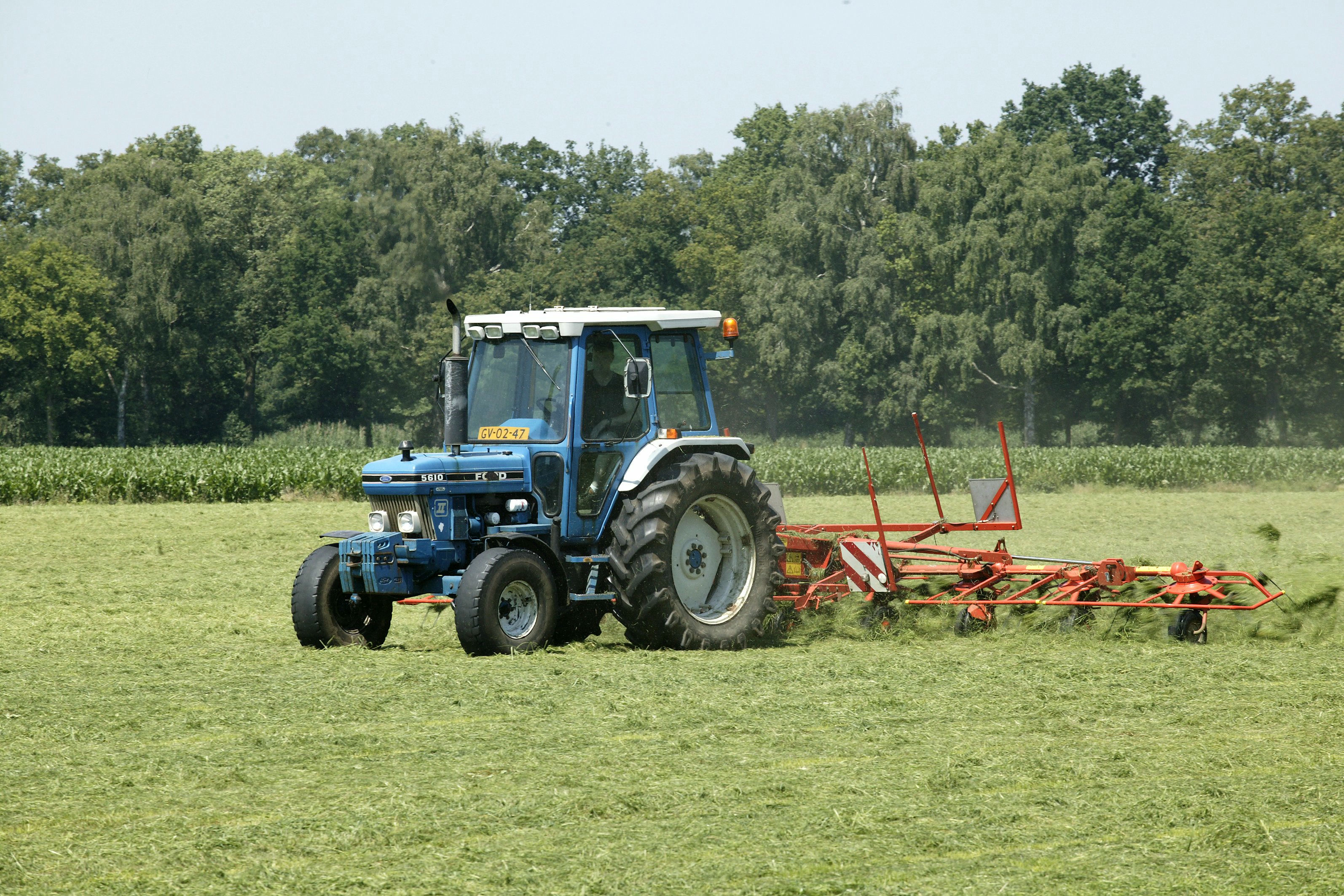
Agriculture in Rossum
