= Rossum, Gelderland =

Rossum
- Village
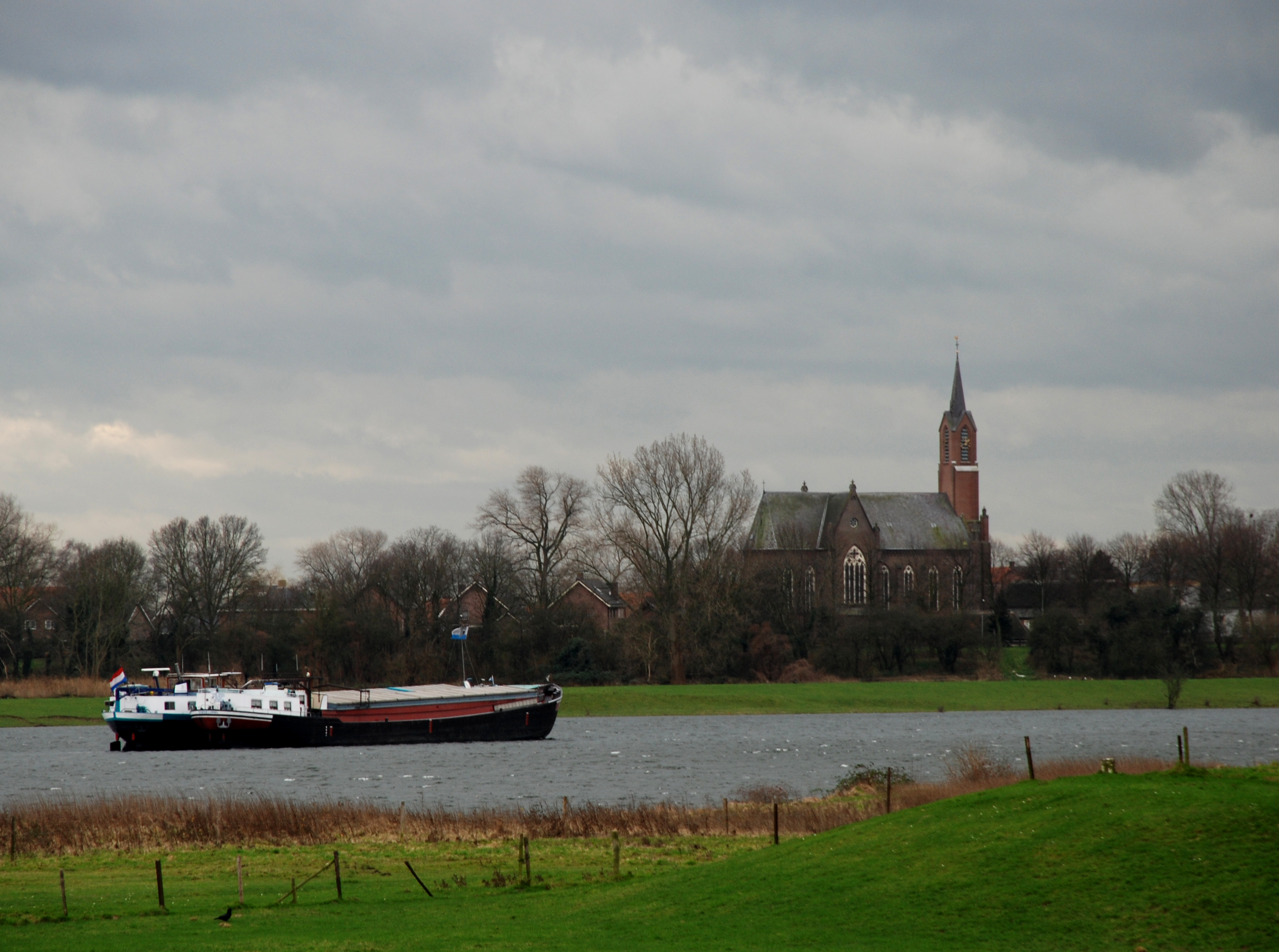
- View from the Maas

- Flag Coat of arms

- Location in the Netherlands Rossum (Netherlands)
- Coordinates: 51°48′3″N 5°20′8″E
- Country: Netherlands
- Province: Gelderland
- Municipality: Maasdriel

Area
  - Total: 14.17 km^{2} (5.47 sq mi)
- Elevation: 5 m (16 ft)

Population (2021)
  - Total: 2,995
  - Density: 211.4/km^{2} (547.4/sq mi)
- Time zone: UTC+1 (CET)
  - Summer (DST): UTC+2 (CEST)
- Postal code: 5328
- Dialing code: 0418

Rossum is a village in the Dutch province of Gelderland. It is a part of the municipality of Maasdriel, and lies about 11 km southwest of Tiel.

Rossum was a separate municipality between 1818 and 1999, when it was merged with Maasdriel.

== History ==
It was first mentioned in 893 as Rotheheym, and means "settlement near cleared forest". It developed into a stretched out esdorp with a centre near the church and one near the castle. The Dutch Reformed Church was a tower of the 16th century with 12th century elements. The church dates from 1860. Huis Rossum was a castle from the 13th century. It was destroyed in 1599 during the Siege of Zaltbommel, and the remainder was demolished in 1740. In 1848, a manor house was constructed on the site of the former castle. In 1840, Rossum was home to 845 people.

== Gallery ==
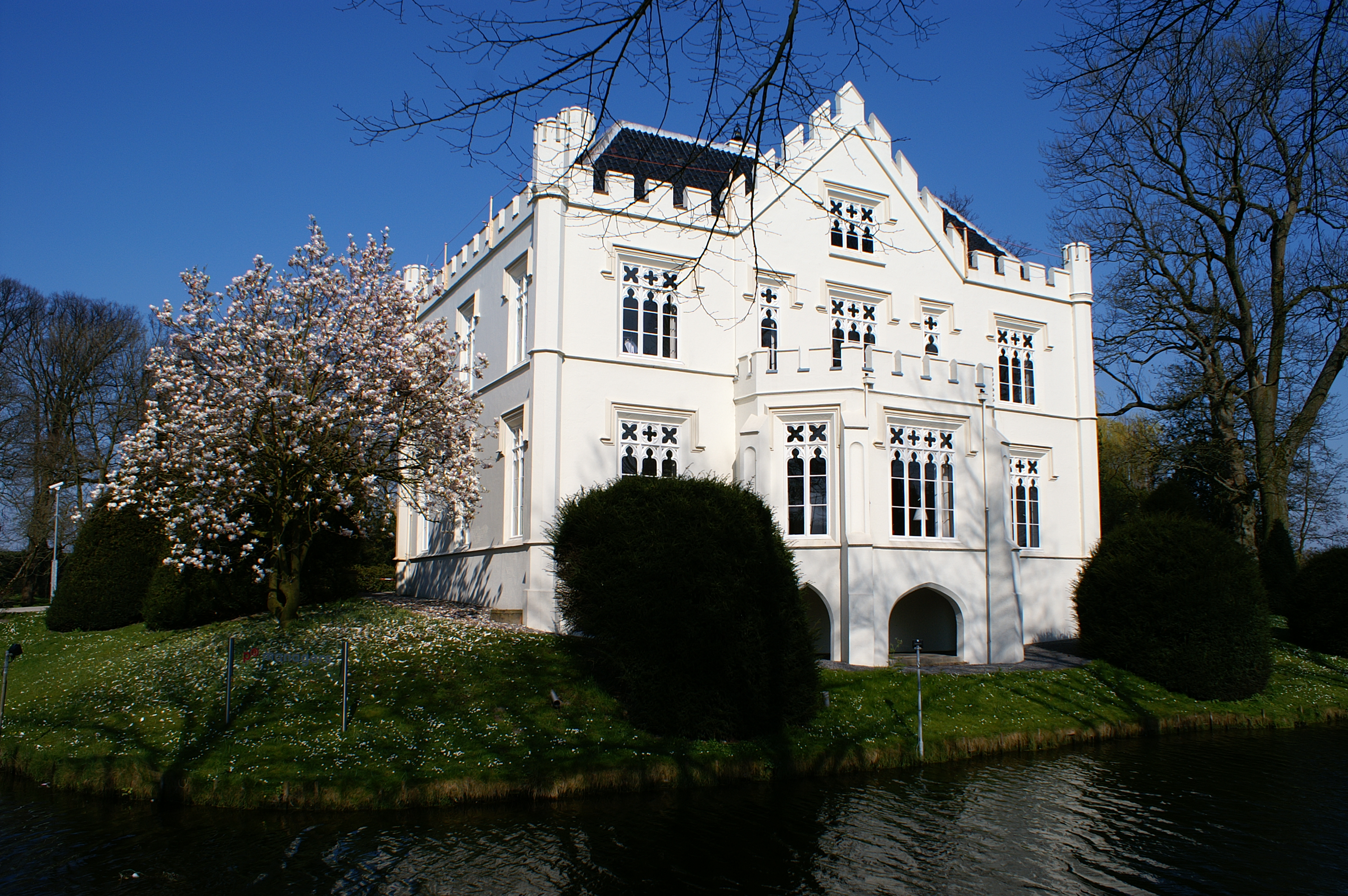
Huis Rossum

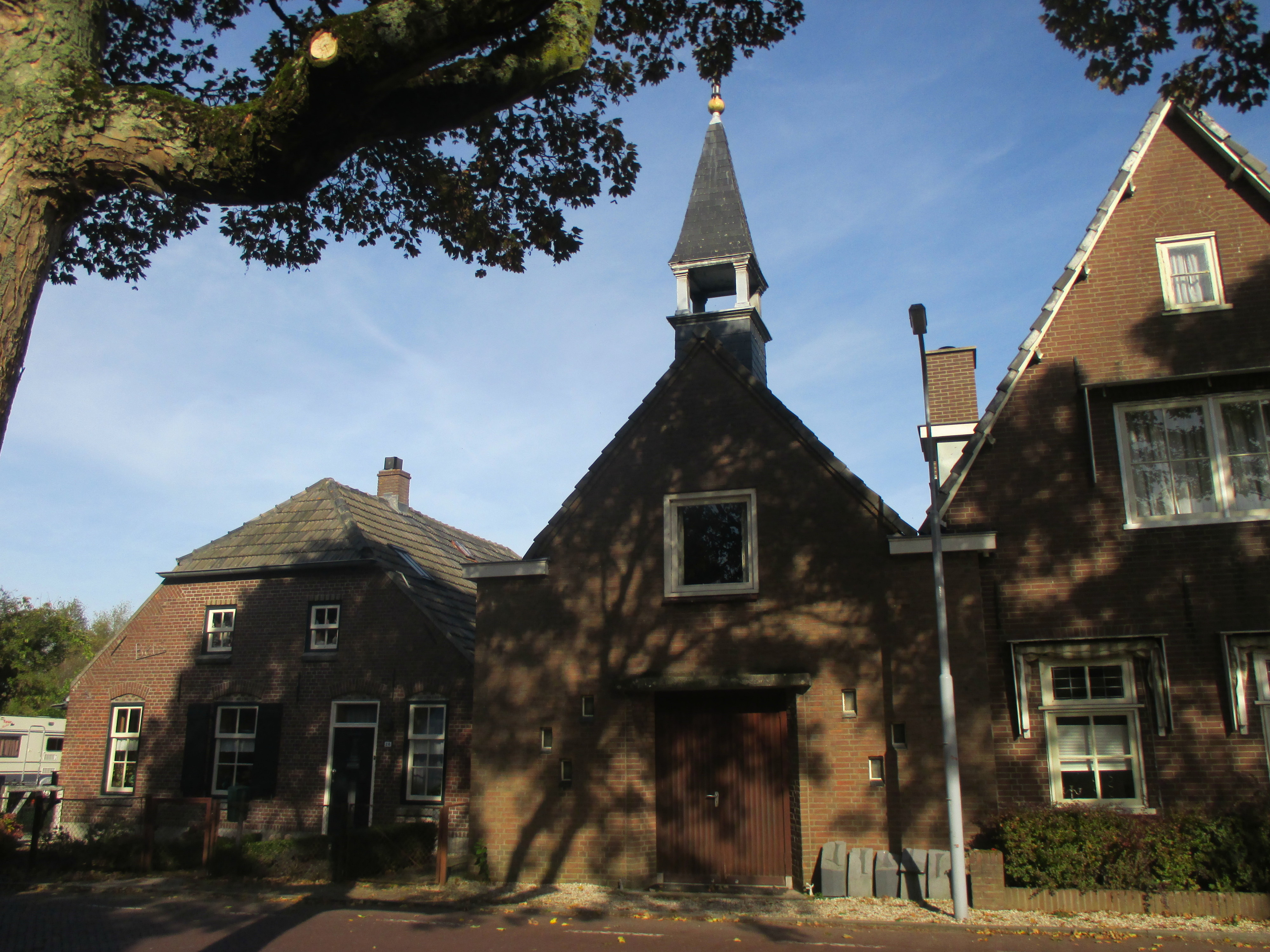
Former Reformed Church

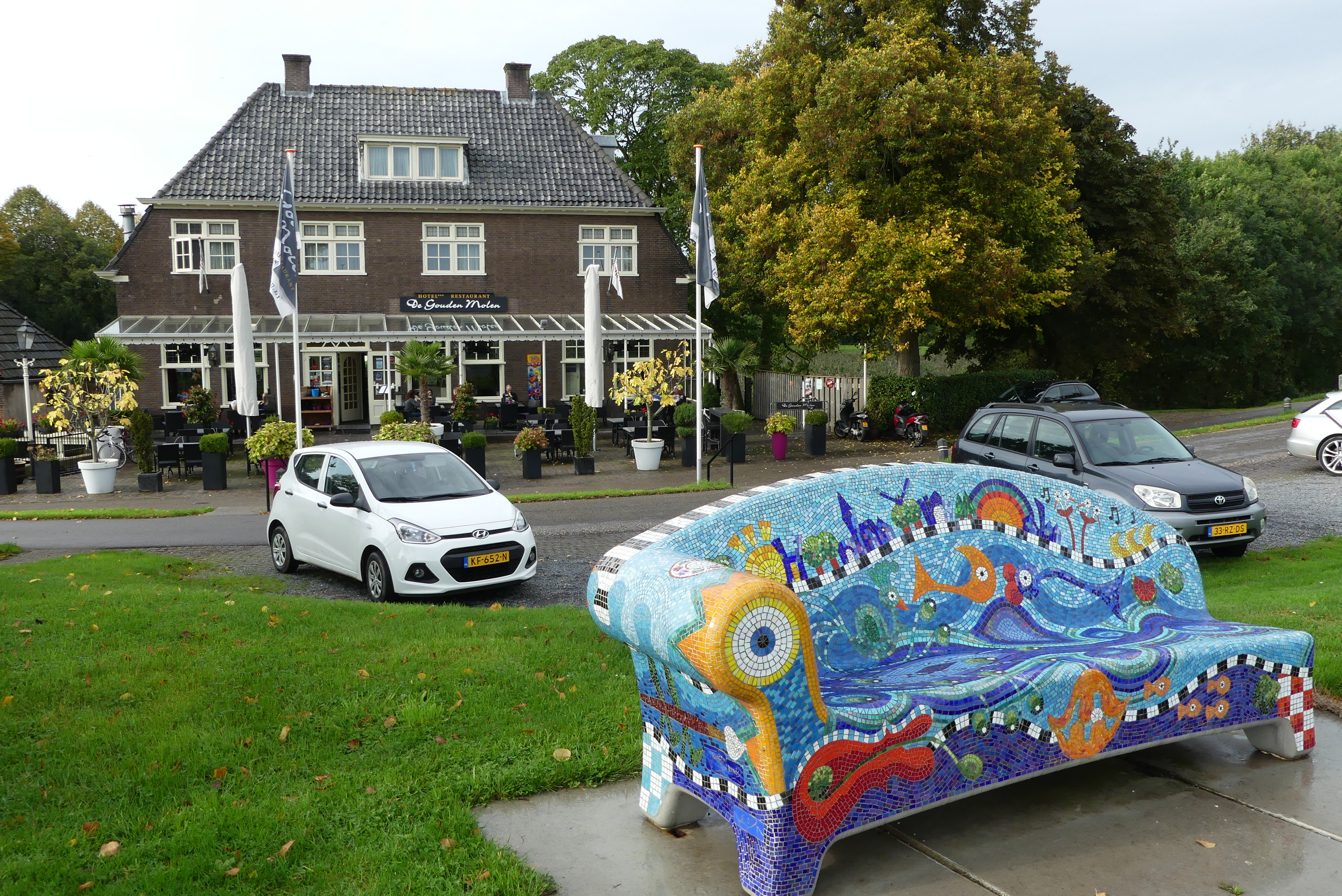
Social sofa and hotel restaurant

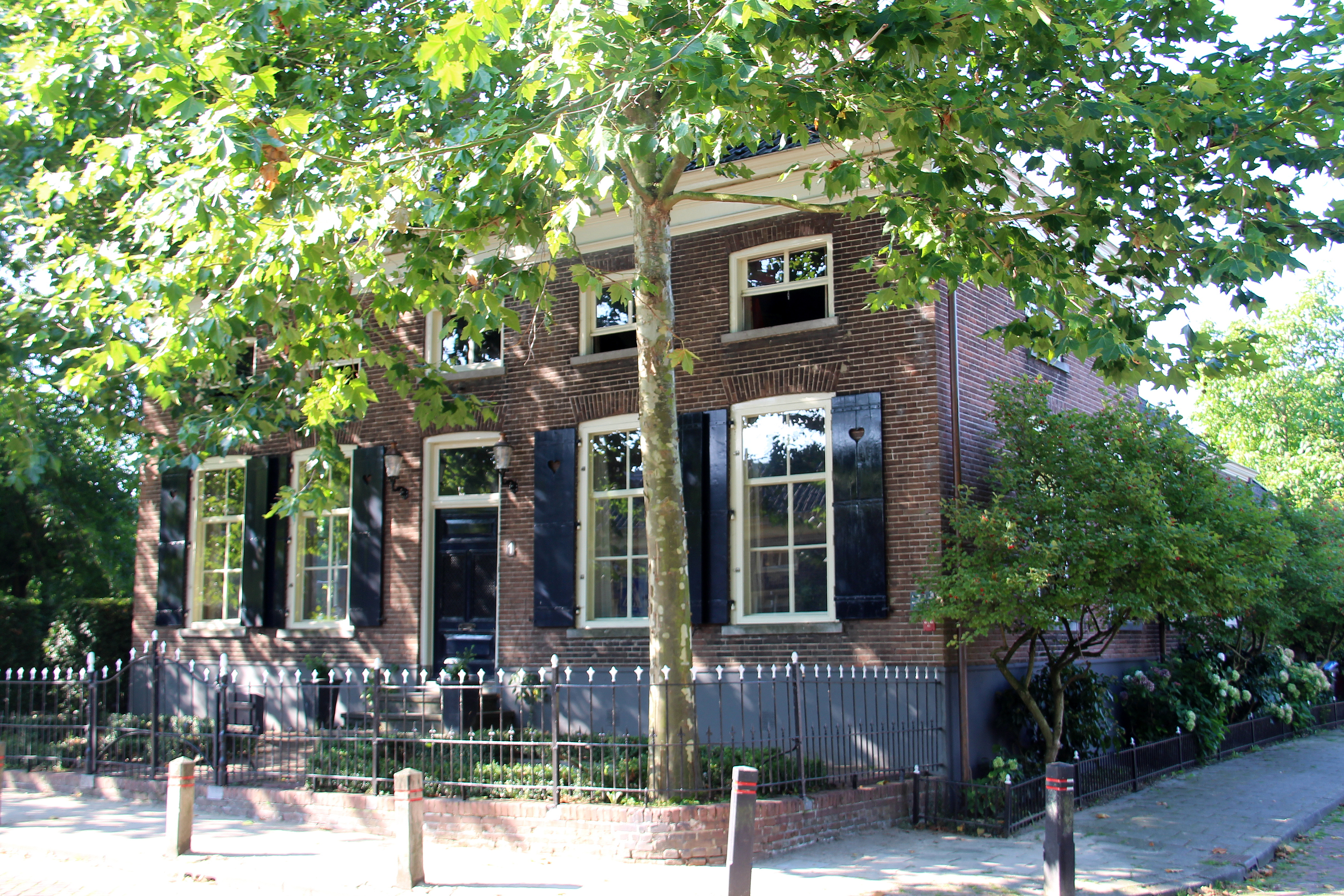
Residential house
