= Makale, Indonesia =

City in South Sulawesi, Indonesia

Coordinates: 3°06′S 119°51′E

The town of Makale is the administrative centre of Tana Toraja Regency, in South Sulawesi Province of Indonesia. The town had about 39,040 inhabitants in mid 2021. It is in the northern part of South Sulawesi and can be reached by bus from Makassar.

== History ==
Makale used to be a place for trading goods and then became one of the biggest towns in Tana Toraja.

== Economy ==
People in Makale mostly work as businessmen. They trade livestock, rice, and pigs. There is a six-day cyclic market that has become the main attraction of the city.

== Transportation ==
This town can be reached by bus from Makassar using inter-city transport. It takes around eight hours from Makassar to Makale, Tana Toraja.
