= Tana Toraja Regency =

Regency in South Sulawesi, Indonesia

Tana Toraja Kabupaten Tana Toraja (Indonesian)
- Regency
- Tana Toraja Regency
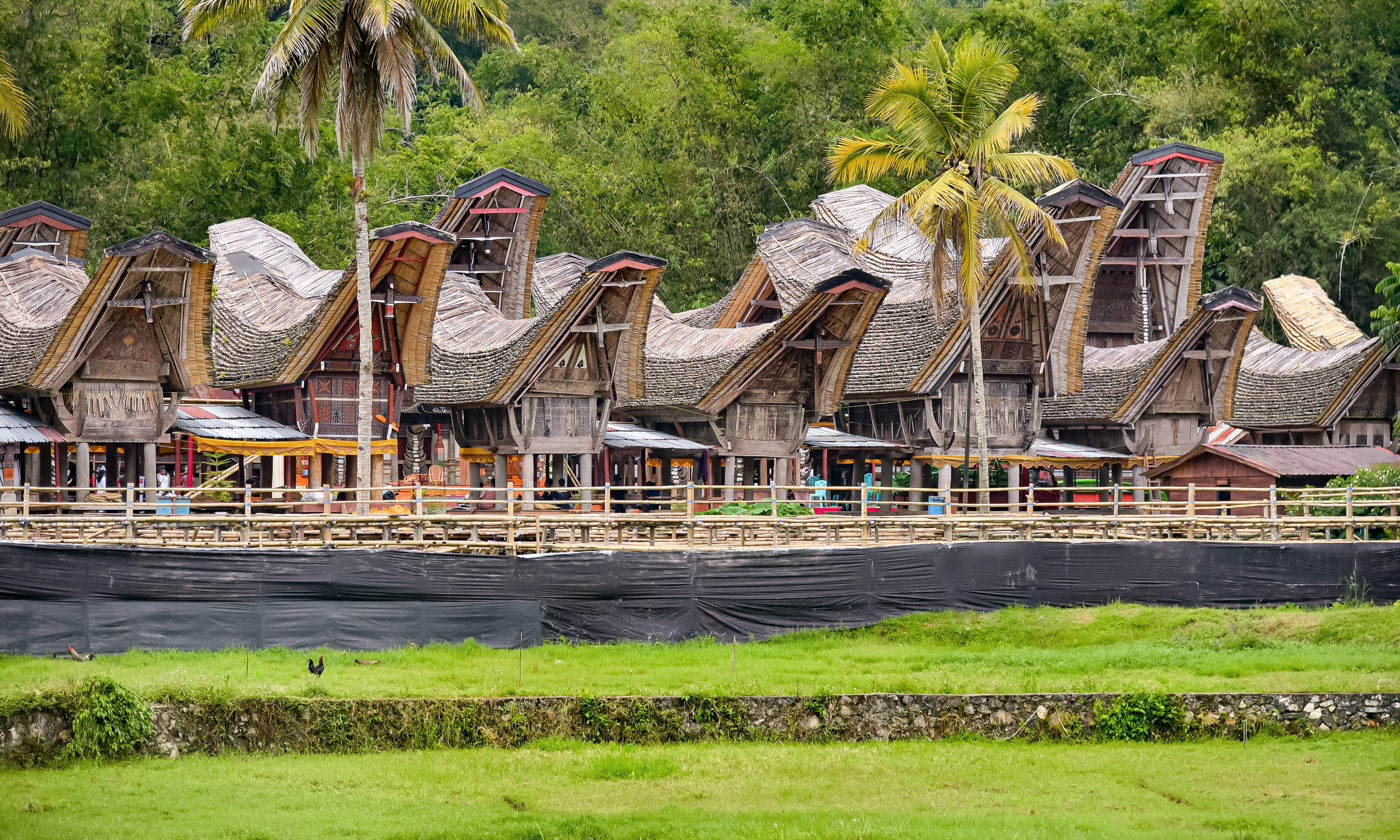
- The traditional tongkonans in Kete Kesu

- Seal

- Location within South Sulawesi
- Country: Indonesia
- Province: South Sulawesi
- Anniversary: 1 September 1247; 779 years ago
- Capital: Makale

Government
  - Regent: Zadrak Tombeg
  - Vice Regent: Erianto Laso Paundanan

Area
  - Total: 2,043.62 km^{2} (789.05 sq mi)

Population (mid 2025 estimate)
  - Total: 256,780
  - Density: 125.65/km^{2} (325.43/sq mi)
- Time zone: UTC+8 (WITA)
- Area code: (+62) 423
- Website: www.tanatorajakab.go.id

Tana Toraja Regency (Indonesian: Kabupaten Tana Toraja; lit. 'Land of the Torajans') is a landlocked regency (kabupaten) of South Sulawesi Province of Indonesia, and home to the Torajan ethnic group. It covers an area of 2,043.62 km^{2} (789.05 sq mi) and had a population of 221,081 at the 2010 census and 280,794 at the 2020 census; the official estimate as at mid 2022 was 291,046 (comprising 150,655 males and 140,391 females), but the total then fell and the official figure for mid 2025 was a much reduced total of 256,780 (comprising 131,603 males and 125,177 females).

The local government seat is in the town of Makale, while the traditional centre of Toraja culture is in Rantepao. Formerly, the Tana Toraja area covered a larger area, but on 24 June 2008 this was divided into two regencies, consisting of Tana Toraja in the west and south with its capital at Makale and Toraja Utara (North Toraja) in the north and east with its capital at Rantepao.

The Tana Toraja boundary was determined by the Dutch East Indies government in 1909. In 1926, Tana Toraja was under the administration of the Bugis state of Luwu. The regentschap (or regency) status was given on 8 October 1946, the last regency given by the Dutch. Since 1984, Tana Toraja has been named as the second tourist destination after Bali by the Ministry of Tourism, Indonesia. Since then, hundreds of thousands of foreign visitors have visited this regency. In addition, numerous Western anthropologists have come to Tana Toraja to study the indigenous culture and people of Toraja.

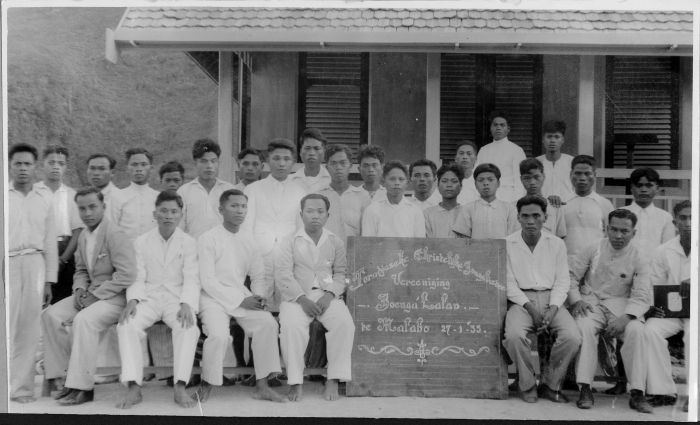
Christian mission in Tana Toraja Regency, Netherlands colonial period. picture credits : Tropenmuseum.

== History ==
The government in Toraja has been started since the government Dutch East Indies. Based on the Emergency Law No. 3 of 1957, the District Level II Tana Toraja was formed which was inaugurated on 31 August 1957 with the first Regent of the Regency named Lakitta.

Decree of the Governor of the First Level Region of South Sulawesi Number 954/XI/1998 dated 14 December 1998, the district of Tana Toraja consisted of 9 definitive districts, 6 district representatives, 22 districts, and 63 villages. Then Law No. 22/1999 on Regional Government was issued, and followed up by issuing Regional Regulation No. 18 of 2000 dated 29 December 2000, 6 district representatives were changed to definitive districts, bringing the total number of districts to 15 definitive districts, 22 districts and 63 villages.

In 2001, the regional regulation no. 2 of 2001 dated 11 April 2001 provided for the entire description of the existing "village" to change their designations from desa to "lembang". After the stipulation of Regional Regulation No. 2 of 2001 concerning the First Amendment to Regional Regulation No. 18 of 2000, the Regional Regulation of Tana-Toraja Regency Number 8 of 2004 concerning the second amendment to the Regional Regulation Number 18 of 2000, as well as the regional regulation number 6 of 2005 concerning the amendment of the Third Regional Regulation Number 18 of 2000, the Tana Toraja Regency area developed into 40 administrative districts (kecamatan), subdivided into 87 kelurahan *urban villages or towns) and 223 lembang (rural villages).

Next came the discourse of "regional expansion", namely the separation of North Toraja Regency. The discourse of the separation had created pros and cons among the Toraja people themselves. The formation of North Toraja Regency was finally determined through the plenary session of the People's Representative Council on 24 June 2008. However, the inauguration of North Toraja Regency was carried out two months later, which was coupled with the commemoration of the 51st anniversary of Tana Toraja Regency, namely on 31 August 2008.

== Geography ==
Tana Toraja is centrally placed in the island of Sulawesi, 300 km north of Makassar, the provincial capital of South Sulawesi. It lies between latitude of 2°-3° South and longitude 119°-120° East (centre: 3°S 120°E). The total area (since the separation of the new regency of North Toraja) is 2,043.62 km^{2}, about 4.5% of the total area of South Sulawesi province. The topography of Tana Toraja is mountainous; its minimum elevation is 150 m, while the maximum is 3,083 above the sea level.

== Administrative districts ==
Tana Toraja Regency comprises nineteen administrative Districts (Kecamatan), tabulated below with their areas and their populations at the 2010 census and the 2020 census, together with the official estimates as at mid 2025. Simbuang and Mappak districts form a southwestern projection from Bonggakarradeng District and the rest of the regency (and are situated to the south of Mamasa Regency, West Sulawesi Province). The table also includes the locations of the administrative centres of the districts, the numbers of administrative villages within each district (totaling 47 urban kelurahan and 112 rural lembang), and its post code.

Kode Wilayah	Name of District (kecamatan)	Area in km^{2}	Pop'n census 2010	Pop'n census 2020	Pop'n estimate mid 2025	Admin centre	No. of villages	Post code
73.18.03	Bonggakaradeng	205.69	6,668	8,023	6,980	Ratte Buttu	6 ^{(a)}	91872
73.18.09	Simbuang	193.81	6,166	7,959	6,560	Simbuang	6 ^{(b)}	91874
73.18.37	Rano	88.97	6,042	7,649	6,455	Rumandan	5	91875
73.18.28	Mappak	165.16	5,509	7,018	5,704	Kondodewata	6 ^{(c)}	91873
73.18.12	Mengkendek	195.72	27,342	36,390	33,487	Rante Kalua'	17 ^{(d)}	91870
73.18.19	Gandangbatu Sillanan	108.07	19,238	23,049	21,078	Benteng Ambeso	12 ^{(e)}	91871
73.18.13	Sangalla	36.05	6,606	7,958	7,437	Bulian Massabu	5 ^{(f)}	91881
73.18.33	Sangalla Selatan (South Sangalla)	47.55	7,361	9,557	8,503	Rante Alang	5 ^{(g)}	91882
73.18.34	Sangalla Utara (North Sangalla)	27.81	7,327	9,041	8,248	Tombang Datu	6 ^{(h)}	91883
73.18.05	Makale	39.54	33,631	38,814	36,825	Bombangan	15 ^{(i)}	91811: 91817 ^{(j)}
73.18.29	Makale Selatan (South Makale)	61.38	12,415	16,609	15,223	Tiromanda	8 ^{(k)}	91815
73.18.27	Makale Utara (North Makale)	25.94	11,799	14,602	13,290	Lion Tondok Iring	5 ^{(m)}	91817 ^{(n)}
73.18.01	Saluputti	87.09	7,424	9,741	9,419	Pattan Ulusalu	9 ^{(p)}	91864
73.18.02	Bittuang	162.42	14,247	18,692	17,370	Bittuang	15 ^{(r)}	91896
73.18.20	Rembon	133.77	18,219	24,662	22,841	Talion	13 ^{(s)}	91860
73.18.31	Masanda	134.07	6,278	8,495	7,782	Pondingao	8	91894
73.18.35	Malimbong Balepe	210.37	8,923	10,517	9,575	Malimbong	6 ^{(t)}	91861
73.18.11	Rantetayo	60.04	10,737	14,614	13,228	Padang Iring	6 ^{(u)}	91863
73.18.38	Kurra	60.19	5,149	7,404	6,775	Rante Kurra	6 ^{(v)}	91862
	Totals	2,043.62	221,081	280,794	256,780	Makale	159	

Notes: (a) includes the kelurahan of Ratte Buttu. (b) includes the kelurahan of Sima. (c) includes the kelurahan of Kondodewata.
(d) comprising the 4 kelurahan of Lemo, Rante Kalua', Tampo and Tengan, plus 13 lembang. (e) comprising the 3 kelurahan of Benteng Ambeso, Mebali and Salubarani, plus 9 lembang.
(f) including the 2 kelurahan of Buntu Masakke and Tongko Sarapung. (g) including the kelurahan of Rante Alanf. (h) including the 2 kelurahan of Bebo' and Leatung.
(i) comprising the 14 kelurahan of Ariang, Batupapan, Bombongan, Botang, Buntu Burake, Kamali Pentalluan, Lamunan, Lapandan, Manggau, Pantan, Rante, Tampo Makale, Tarongko and Tondon Mamullu, plus one lembang (Lea). (j) the 5 kelurahan of Ariang, Bombongan, Lamunan, Pantan and Tarongko share the postcode of 91811; Batupapan has the postcode of 91813 and Nanggu has the postcode of 91814; the other 7 kelurahan and the one lembang share the postcode of 91817.
(k) comprising the 4 kelurahan of Pasang, Sandabilik, Tiromanda and Tosapan, plus 4 lembang.
(m) all 5 are kelurahan - Bungin, Lemo, Lion Tondok Iring, Sarira and Tambunan. (n) except the kelurahan of Bungin, which has a postcode of 91812.
(p) including the kelurahan of Pattan Ulusalu. (r) including the kelurahan of Bittuang. (s) including the 2 kelurahan of Rembon and Talion. (t) including the kelurahan of Malimbong.
(u) comprising the 3 kelurahan of Padangiring, Rantetayo and Tapparan, plus 3 lembang. (v) including the 2 kelurahan of Bambalu and Rante Kurra.

== Demographics ==
=== Ethnicity ===
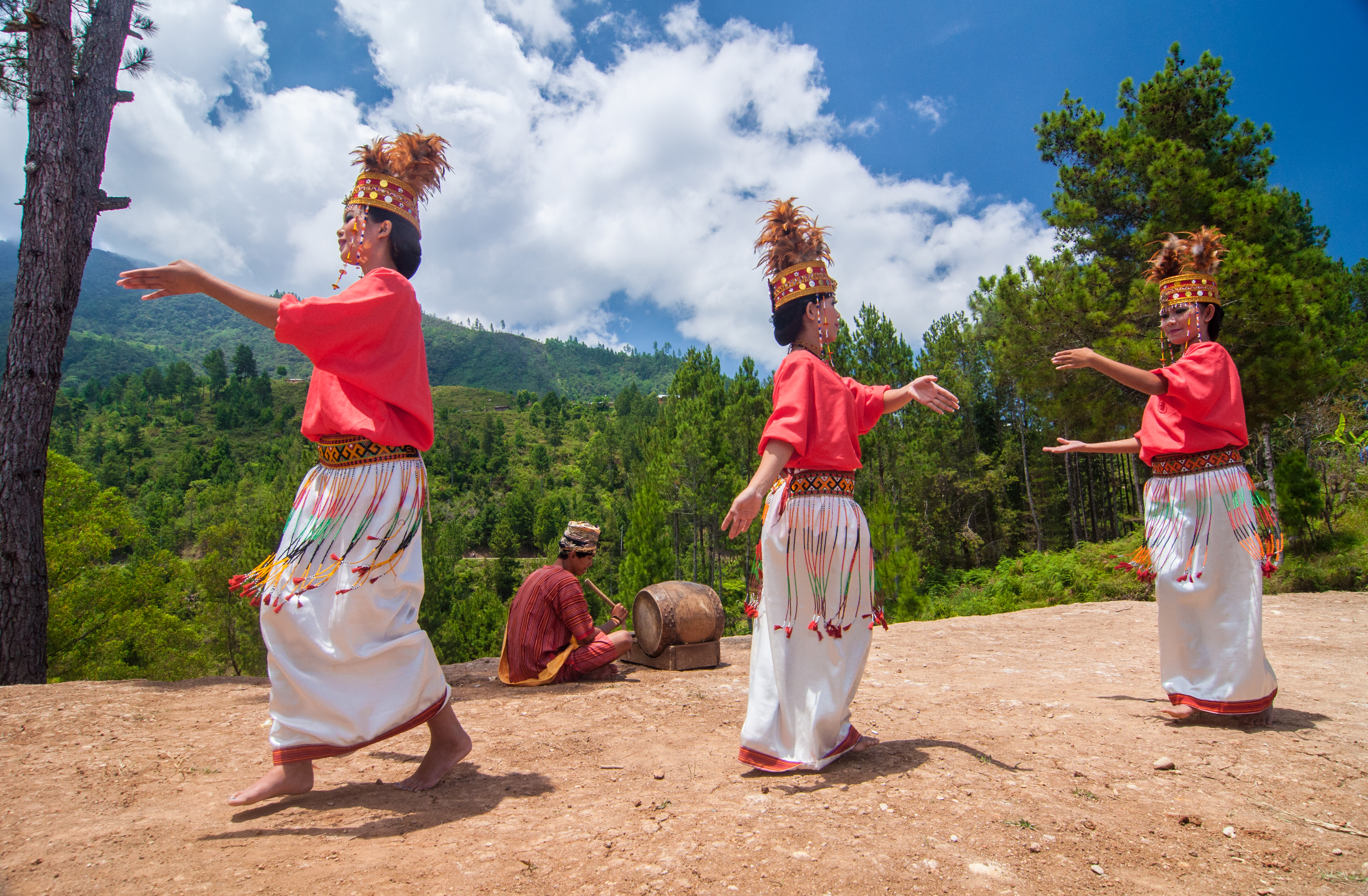
Pagellu Dance, Toraja traditional dance

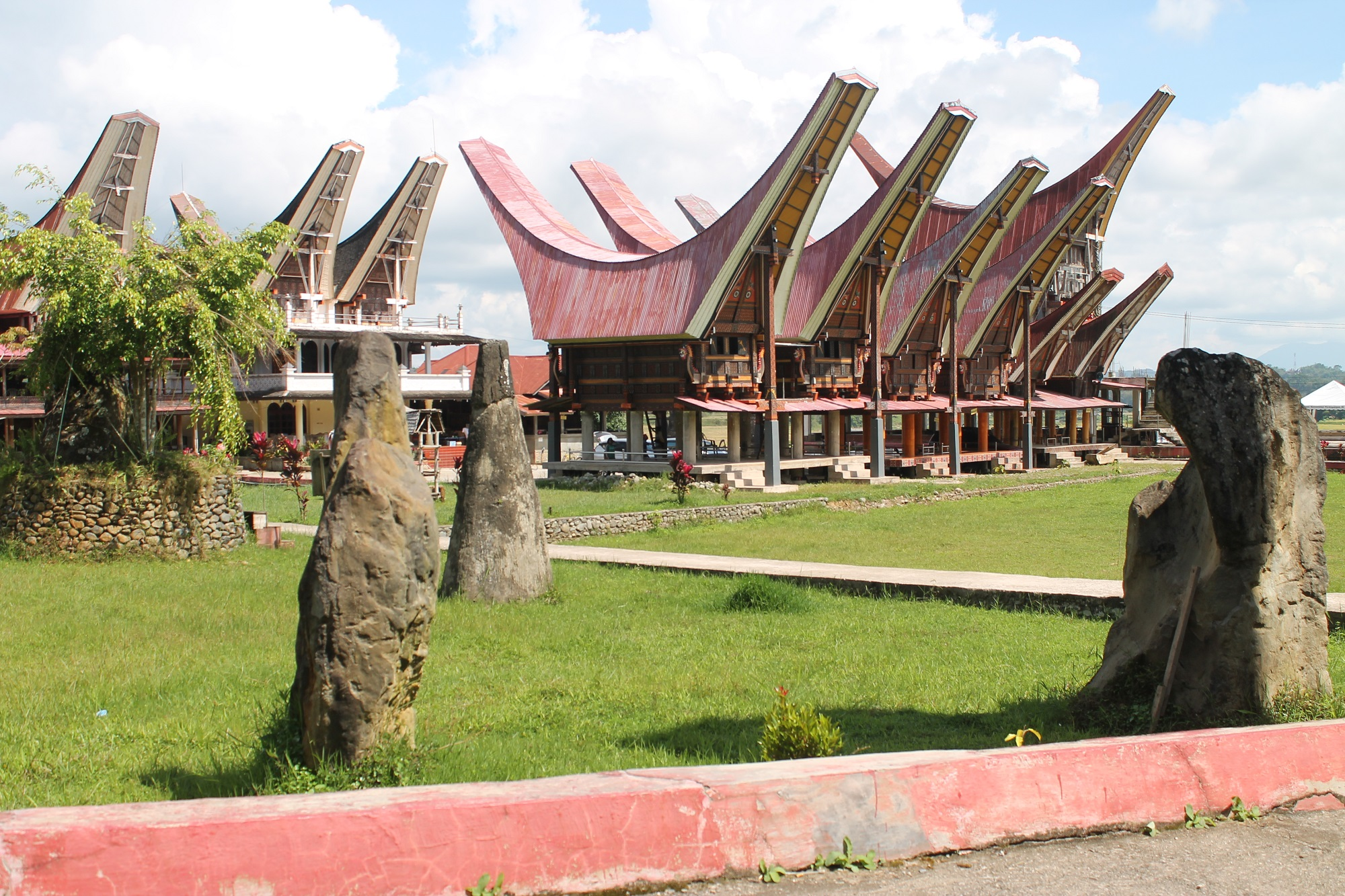
Toraja traditional house

The original tribe that inhabits Tana Toraja is the Toraja tribe. The Toraja people are a tribe who live in the mountainous region of the northern part of the province of South Sulawesi, Indonesia. The population of the Toraja people is estimated at around 1 million people, and 500,000 of them are in Tana Toraja Regency, North Toraja Regency, and Mamasa Regency. Most of the Toraja people embrace Christianity, while some adhere to Islam and an animist belief known as Aluk Todolo. The Indonesian government has recognised this belief as part of the Hindu religion.

The word Toraja itself comes from the Bugis language, namely "to riaja" which means "people who live in the land above". In 1909, the Dutch colonial government called this tribe the Toraja. The Toraja tribe is famous for its funeral rituals, Tongkonan traditional houses and also various types of wood carvings typical of Toraja. Toraja funeral rituals are important social events, usually attended by hundreds of people and lasting for several days.

Before the 20th century, the Toraja tribe still lived in autonomous villages. They previously still adhered to animism, and had not been touched by the outside world. In the early 1900s, Dutch missionaries arrived and began to spread Christianity. Then, around the 1970s, Toraja people began to open up to the outside world, and Tana Toraja district (before it was expanded) became a symbol of Indonesian tourism. Then there was the development of Tana Toraja tourism, and it was studied by anthropology. So that in 1990-1s, the Toraja people underwent a cultural transformation, from a society with traditional and agrarian beliefs, to a society that was predominantly Christian, and the tourism sector in the Tana Toraja area continued to increase.

=== Religion ===
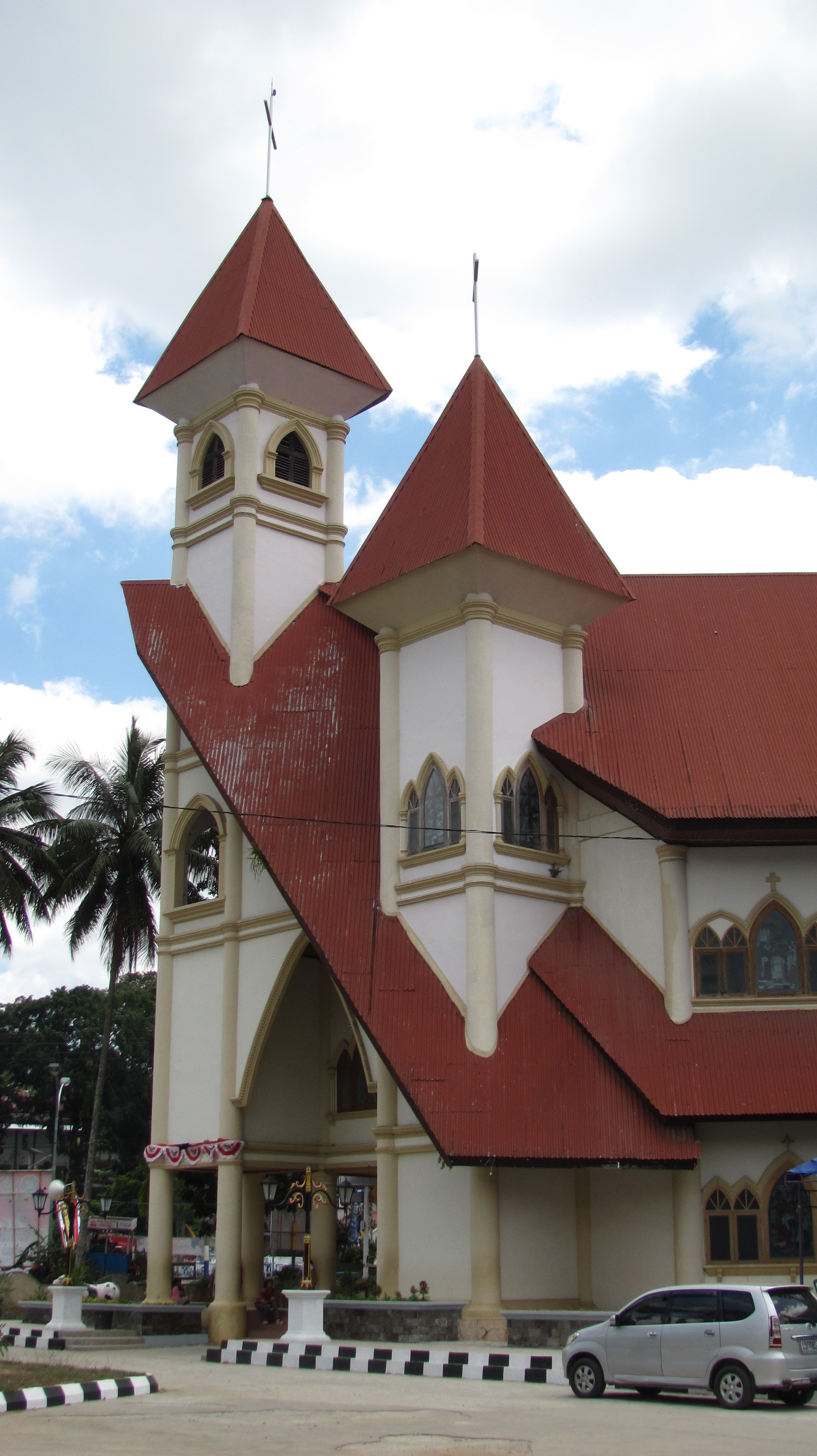
A Roman Catholic parish church in Makale

Religion in Tana Toraja Regency (2021)
1. Protestantism (69.5%)
2. Roman Catholic (16.4%)
3. Islam (12.2%)
4. Hinduism (1.71%)
5. Buddhism (0.17%)
6. Other (0.01%)

Based on data from the Ministry of Home Affairs in 2021, it is noted that a large majority of Tana Toraja's population (85.94%) adhered to Christianity, including 69.49% following Protestantism and 16.45% Roman Catholicism. Most of the remaining population (12.17%) followed Islam, with smaller minorities adhering to Hinduism (1.71%) and Buddhism (0.17%) and other faiths (0.01%).

== Tourism ==
=== Tourist attractions ===
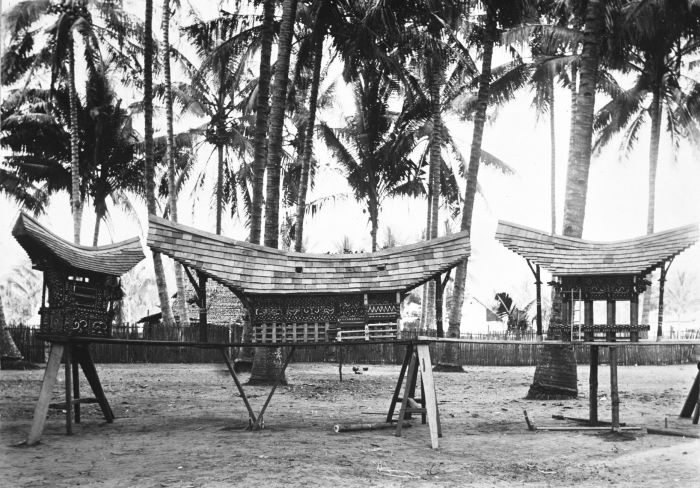
Miniature of a Toraja house at a celebration in 1910–1940.

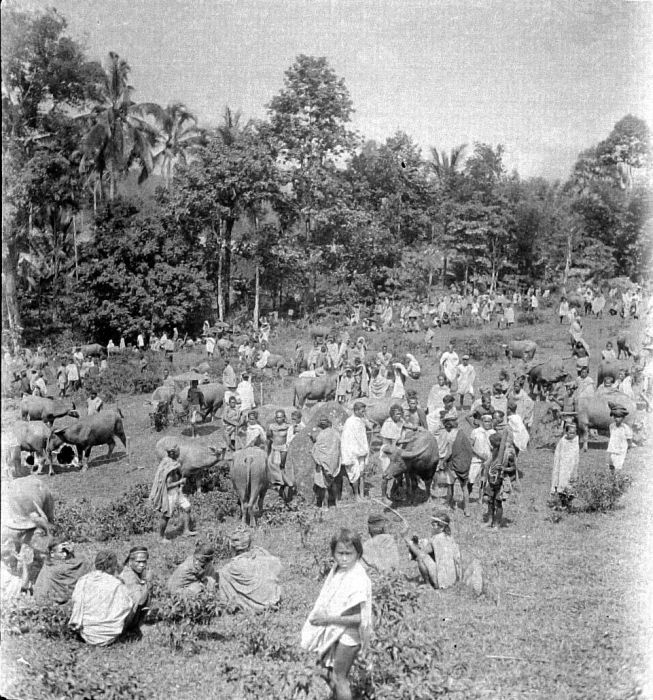
Celebrations in Toraja before 1939.

Tourists visit the South Sulawesi highlands primarily to experience Toraja culture and daily life.

In 1974, Tongkonan Siguntu' dirara (traditional ceremony / Rambu Tuka') was attended by delegates from 60 foreign countries who attended the PATA conference in Jakarta in 1974. Since then Toraja has become known as a cultural tourism destination in Indonesia.

=== Buntu Kalando ===
Tongkonan/house where Puang Sangalla' (king of Sangalla') lives. As the resting place of Puang Sangala' and also the palace where the government of the Sangalla' kingdom was managed at that time, Tongkonan Buntu Kalando had the title "tando tananan langi' lantangna Kaero tongkonan layuk". Currently Tongkonan Buntu Kalando is used as a museum to store prehistoric objects and relics of the Sangalla kingdom.

=== Kambira ===
The graves of babies whose teeth have not yet grown (aged 6 months and under) are placed in a living tree that is hollowed out.

=== Pallawa ===
Tongkonan Pallawa is one of the tongkonan or traditional houses and is located among the bamboo trees at the top of the hill. The tongkonan is decorated with a number of buffalo horns that are plugged in the front of the traditional house. It is located about 12 km to the north of Rantepao.

=== Lemo ===
The place is often referred to as the home of the spirits. At the Lemo cemetery, we can see corpses kept in the open air, in the middle of steep rocks. This burial complex is a blend of death, art and ritual. At certain times the clothes of the corpses will be changed through the Ma' Nene ceremony.

Located on Burake Hill, Tana Toraja has built the Statue of Jesus Christ Blessing which is claimed to be the tallest Jesus statue in the world. This means that the location of the statue is at an altitude of 1100 meters above sea level or the location of the tallest statue in the world, while the size of the statue itself is not the highest in the world.

== Conservation efforts ==
Tana Toraja is one of the conservation sites for the Proto-Malayo-Polynesian cultural civilisation which is still well-maintained today. Traditional culture, music, dance, oral literary arts, language, houses, carvings, weaving and culinary which are still very traditional, have made the Indonesian government strive for Tana Toraja to be known internationally, including by nominating Tana Toraja to UNESCO to become a UNESCO World Heritage Site since 2009.

Japan also supported making Tana Toraja a UNESCO World Heritage Site and has committed to participate in conservation efforts, especially related to traditional houses in the area. This support was conveyed in a meeting between the Indonesian and Japanese delegations on September 11, 2010, after the Asian and European Culture Minister Meeting in Poznan, Poland.

== See also ==
- List of regencies and cities of Indonesia
