= Heri Dono =

Indonesian artist

Heri Dono is an Indonesian visual artist as artist painter, sculptor, and installation artist.

== Life and work ==
Dono was born in Jakarta on June 12, 1960. He studied at the Indonesian Art Institute (Institut Seni Indonesia) in Yogyakarta, where he won the Prize for the Best Painting in 1981 as well as in 1985. He presented his work worldwide in a great number of solo and group exhibitions.

He is mainly active as an installation artist, and works with materials that come from varying places in the world. In his work, known influences can be noticed, like the life of the ordinary man, wayang kulit, becak driver and tau tau sculptures of the Toraja in Sulawesi.

Dono, who lives and works in Yogyakarta, mixes humoristic comments in his work on political and social problems in Indonesia. In 1998, he won a Prince Claus Award.

His style is often placed in the art form of new internationalism, which is a recent art form of artists in the world that challenge the Western hegemony of art, in contrast with the New Art Movement in the seventies and eighties that chose in favor of a Western expressions in art, with it taking leave of local traditions.

Dono is represented by Baik Art, which has spaces in Los Angeles and Seoul.

== Solo exhibitions ==
- 1988: Cemeti Contemporary Art Gallery, Yogyakarta, Indonesia; Mitra Budaya Indonesia Gallery, Jakarta, Indonesia; Bentara Budaya Gallery, Jogjakarta, Indonesia
- 1991: Unknown Dimensions, Museum fur Volkerkunde, Basel, Switzerland.
- 1993: Canberra Contemporary Art Space, ACT, Australia
- 1996: Blooming in Arms, Museum of Modern Art, Oxford, England.
- 2000: Dancing Demons and Drunken Deities, The Japan Foundation Forum, Tokyo, Jepang
- 2001: Trap’s outer Rim, Cemeti Art House, Jogjakarta, Indonesia
- 2001: Fortress of the Heart, Gajah Gallery, Singapore
- 2002: Interrogation, Center A, Vancouver, Canada
- 2002: Heri Memprovokasi Heri, Nadi Gallery, Jakarta, Indonesia
- 2002: Free-DOM, Bentara Budaya, Jakarta, Indonesia
- 2002: Reworking Tradition I & II, Singapore
- 2003: Upside Down Mind, CP Artspace, Washington, VS
- 2003: Heri Dono, Australian Print Workshop, Melbourne, Australia
- 2003: Perjalanan Spiritual Heri Dono, Galeri Semarang, Indonesia
- 2004: Who’s Afraid of Donosaurus?, Galeri Nasional Indonesia, Jakarta
- 2006: Broken Angels, Gertrude Street Gallery, Melbourne, Australia
- 2009-10: Critical Art from Indonesia, Tropenmuseum, Amsterdam
- 2011: "Madman Butterfly", Rossi & Rossi, London
