= Mamasa people =

Ethnic group in Indonesia

Mamasa
To Mamasa
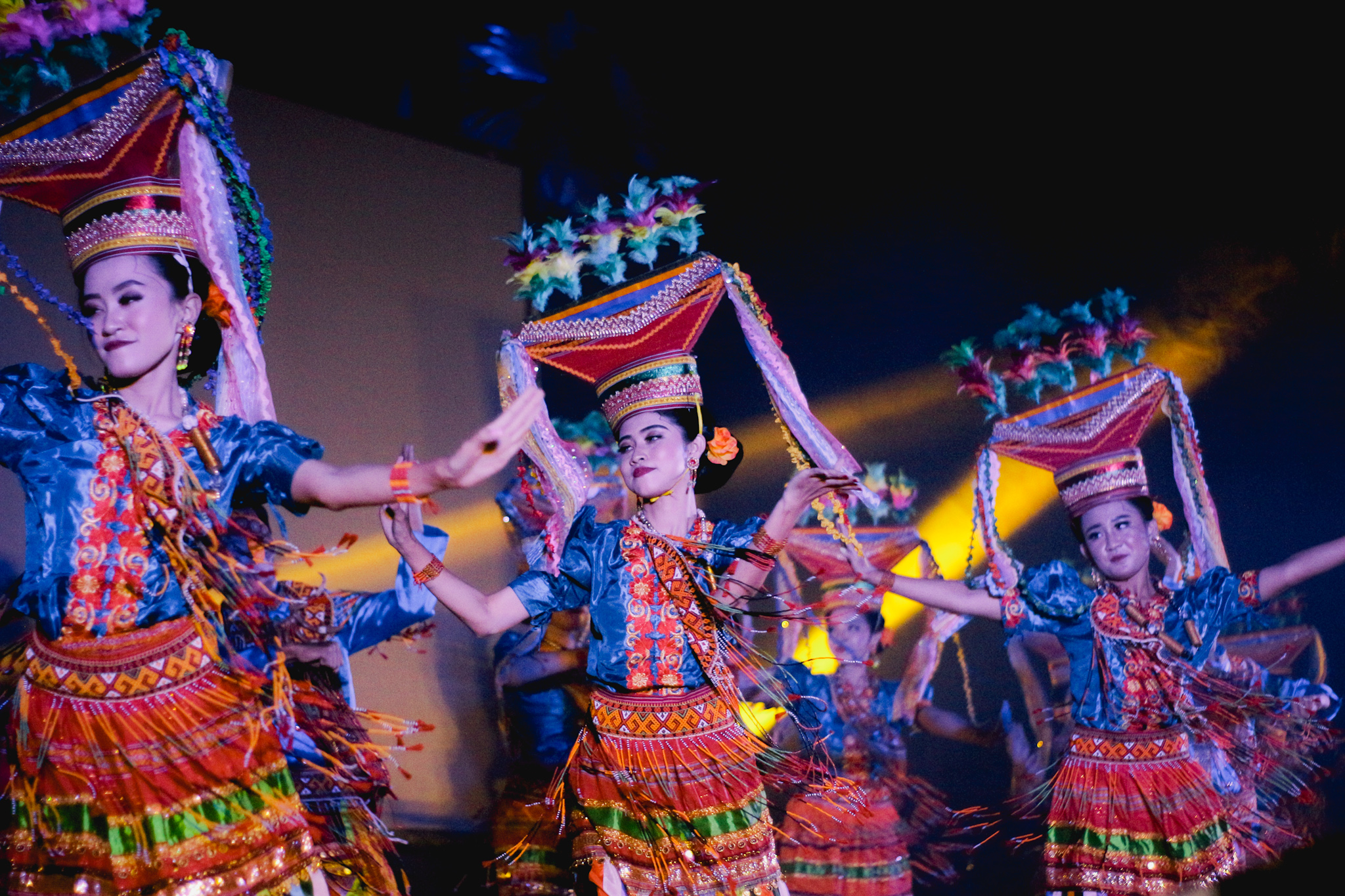
- Tondok dance, a traditional dance of the Mamasa people.

Total population
- 133,659 (2010)

Regions with significant populations
- West Sulawesi

Languages
- Mamasa

Religion
- Protestantism (majority); Islam and Catholicism (minority)

Related ethnic groups
- Toraja • Kalumpang • Mandar

Mamasa people (Mamasa: To Mamasa) is an ethnic group residing in Mamasa Regency, West Sulawesi. The Mamasa people is known in several districts in Mamasa Regency. They are part of the Toraja sub-people, although some consider them separate based on linguistic differences. Mamasa language is similar to Toraja language. The Mamasa people are often referred to as the Toraja Mamasa people.

== History ==
Folklore tells that Nene' Torije'ne (ancestral ancestors) came from the sea and Nene' Pongkapadang (grandfather ancestors) came from the eastern mountains of Sulawesi. After they met they moved to Buntu Bulo, in Tabulahan near Mamuju Regency.

According to researchers, this Mamasa people was originally from the Toraja Sa'dan people who migrated to this area—developing into a community that is now more commonly known as the Mamasa people.

== Religion ==
In this ethnic, the majority faith is Protestant, with a minority Islam and Catholic.

The development of Christianity was accepted by the Mamasa people around the early 1900s as professed by missionaries from the Netherlands. They speak the Mamasa language. The Mamasa language is grouped into the Toraja language family, because there are many language similarities between the Mamasa language and the Toraja language. Mamasa is spoken in the area along the Mamasa River on the border of Mamasa Regency and Polewali Mandar Regency, West Sulawesi.

The ancestral religion is Ada' Mappurondo or Aluk Tomatua. This religious tradition continues to be passed across the generations. The tradition of Ada' Mappurondo is carried out especially after the rice harvest, in thanksgiving for their harvest. One tradition from the traditional religion of the Mamasa people is unique, namely the burial tradition. The corpse is made to walk by itself to the prepared grave. They believe that all corpses of a family or relative will be in the same place in the afterlife.

== Culture ==
=== Language ===
The Mamasa language has several dialects, namely:

- North Mamasa
- Middle Mamasa
- Pattae' (South Mamasa, Patta' Binuang, Binuang, Tae', Binuang-Paki-Batetanga-Anteapi)

=== Custom house ===
The Mamasa people have a traditional house that functioned as a residence and for crop storage. The traditional house of the Mamasa people is unique. Its shape resembles a ship, like their ancestors' ships when they crossed the sea and settled in this area. The traditional house of the Mamasa people is similar to the traditional house of the Toraja people.

=== Art ===
Mamasa people practice arts that are inherent in their culture such as dances, musical instruments and traditional clothes.

The several traditional dances are Tondok, Bulu Londong, Malluya, and Burrake.

A musical instrument owned by the Mamasa people, is the pompang flute. It is made of bamboo and is played by blowing into it and presented in an ensemble form. Traditional clothes for men include pongko clothes and toraya pants, while the women wear woven skirts and carry woven bags.

=== Tradition ===
Rambu Solo or mourning parties are not only a sacred tradition for the people of Mamasa Regency, West Sulawesi. The tradition of this death party is also a place to glue the big family of Mamasa's noble lineage together.

To entertain the bereaved families and invited guests who were present, the committee presented a spectacle in the form of a buffalo fight. The buffalo fight in a special arena in Mamasa was carried out until the peak of the funeral was over.

== Agriculture ==
The Mamasa farm rice, corn, cassava, sweet potatoes, peanuts, green beans, soybeans, vegetables and various types of fruits. They also plant coffee and cocoa in a traditional way. They also raise livestock, such as pigs, buffalo, cows, horses, goats, chickens and ducks. Some are sold to increase family income.

== See also ==
- Ethnic groups in Indonesia
- Torajan people
- Mamasa Regency
