= Nosu (disambiguation) =

Nosu is a district in the Mamasa Regency, West Sulawesi, Indonesia.

Nosu or NOSU may also refer to:

- Yi people of China, Vietnam, and Thailand
- National Organization of Scouts of Ukraine
