= Mamasa language =

Austronesian language spoken in Sulawesi, Indonesia

Mamasa
- Native to: Indonesia
- Region: West Sulawesi
- Ethnicity: Mamasa; Pattae' (dialect speaker of Pattae')
- Native speakers: 89,000 (2010 Census)
- Language family: Austronesian: Malayo-Polynesian; South Sulawesi; Northern; Toraja; Mamasa
- Dialects: Northern Mamasa; Central Mamasa; Pattae'

Language codes
- ISO 639-3: mqj
- Glottolog: mama1276
- Map showing the distribution of the South Sulawesi languages in Sulawesi and Kalimantan, Mamasa language in number 28.

Mamasa is an Austronesian language spoken in West Sulawesi, Indonesia. This language is the native language of the Mamasa people which is related to the Toraja people.

== Dialects ==
Three dialects can be distinguished:

- Northern Mamasa
- Central Mamasa
- Pattae'

Speakers of Pattae' are a culturally distinct ethnic group traditionally more affiliated to the Mandar people than to speakers of the Northern and Central Mamasa dialects in the interior, and for that reason Pattae' is considered by its speakers to be a language separate from Mamasa proper (i.e. Northern and Central Mamasa).

== Phonology ==
Mamasa has the following consonants and vowels:

Consonants
		Labial	Alveolar	Palatal	Velar	Glottal
Nasal		m	n		ŋ	
Plosive	voiceless	p	t		k	ʔ
Plosive	voiced	b	d		g	
Fricative			s			
Lateral			l			
Trill			r			
Semivowel		w		j		

Vowels
	Front	Central	Back
High	i		u
Mid	e		o
Low		a	
