= Tabang =

District in Mamasa Regency, West Sulawesi Province, Indonesia

Tabang is a district in Mamasa Regency, West Sulawesi, Indonesia. As of the 2010 census the population of Tabang was 5,890.
