= Mamasa Regency =

Coordinates: 3°06′47″S 119°22′58″E

Mamasa Regency Kabupaten Mamasa
- Regency
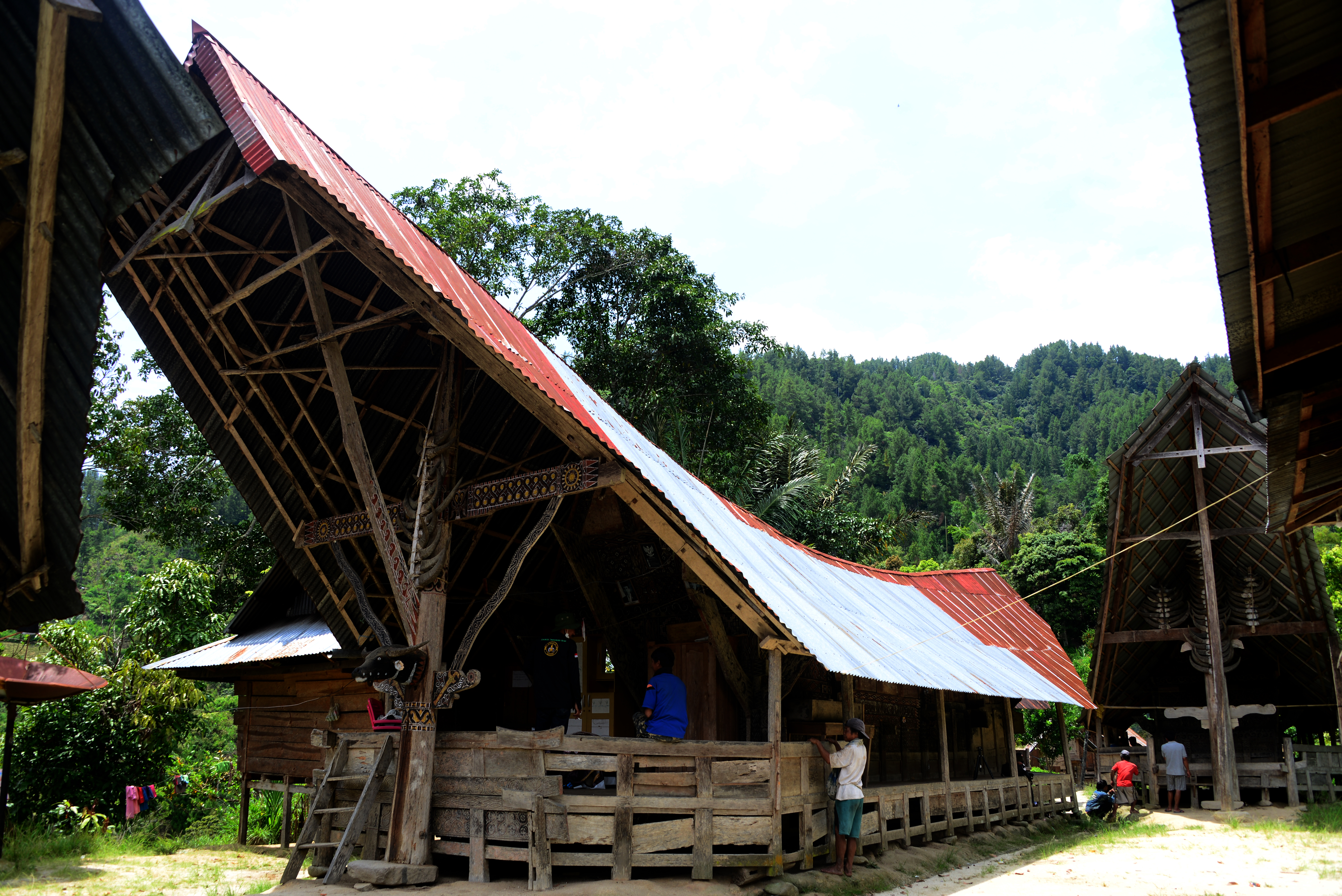
- Traditional house of Mamasa people

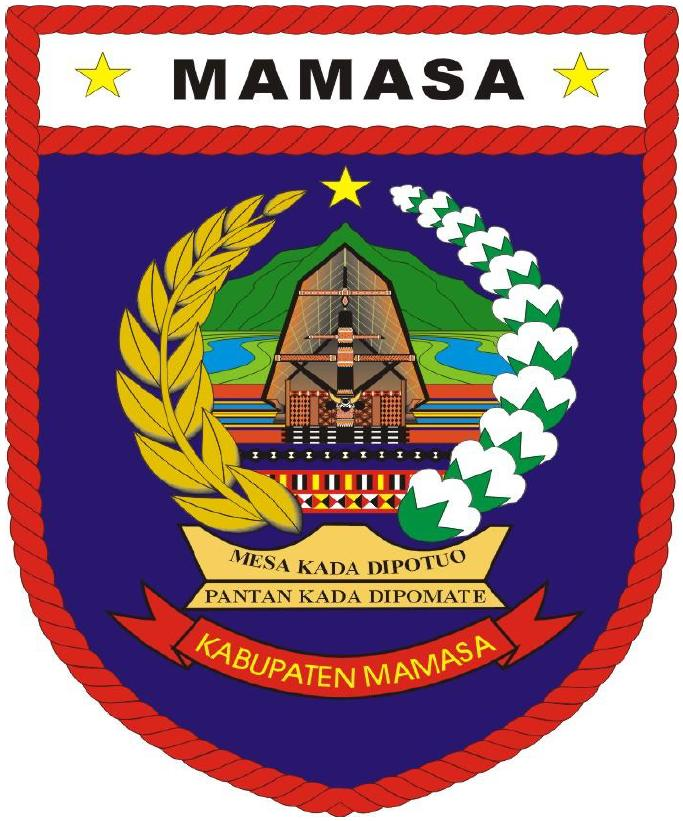
- Coat of arms
- Motto(s): Mesa Kada Dipotuo Pantan Kada Dipomate (United We Stand, Divided We Fall)
- Country: Indonesia
- Province: West Sulawesi
- Capital: Mamasa

Government
  - Regent: Welem Sambolangi
  - Vice Regent: Sudirman

Area
  - Total: 3,005.88 km^{2} (1,160.58 sq mi)

Population (mid 2025 estimate)
  - Total: 170,354
  - Density: 56.6736/km^{2} (146.784/sq mi)
- Website: mamasakab.go.id

Mamasa Regency (Indonesian: Kabupaten Mamasa), covering a land area of 3,005.88 km^{2} with its capital at Mamasa town, is the only landlocked regency among the six regencies that make up the West Sulawesi (Sulawesi Barat) Province on the island of Sulawesi in Indonesia. The Mamasa people, a sub-group of the Toraja people, form the most common ethnic group.

== History ==
=== Pre-history ===
The oldest evidence for humans on Sulawesi are stone tools produced by archaic humans, dating from over 200,000 to 100,000 years ago, that were found at the Talepu site in southwestern Sulawesi.

=== Hindu-Buddhist era ===
In 1367, several identified polities located on the island were mentioned in the Javanese manuscript Nagarakretagama dated from the Majapahit period. Canto 14 mentioned polities including Gowa, Makassar, Luwu and Banggai. It seems that by the 14th century, polities in the island were connected in an archipelagic maritime trading network, centered in the Majapahit port in East Java. By 1400, a number of nascent agricultural principalities had arisen in the western Cenrana valley, as well as on the south coast and on the west coast near modern Parepare.

=== Christian colonial era ===
The first Europeans to visit the island (which they believed to be an archipelago due to its contorted shape) were the Portuguese sailors Simão de Abreu in 1523, and Gomes de Sequeira (among others) in 1525, sent from the Moluccas in search of gold, which the islands had the reputation of producing. A Portuguese base was installed in Makassar in the first decades of the 16th century, lasting until 1665, when it was taken by the Dutch. The Dutch had arrived in Sulawesi in 1605 and were quickly followed by the English, who established a factory in Makassar. From 1660, the Dutch were at war with Gowa, the major Makassar west coast power. In 1669, Admiral Speelman forced the ruler, Sultan Hasanuddin, to sign the Treaty of Bongaya, which handed control of trade to the Dutch East India Company. The Dutch were aided in their conquest by the Bugis warlord Arung Palakka, ruler of the Bugis kingdom of Bone. The Dutch built a fort at Ujung Pandang, while Arung Palakka became the regional overlord and Bone the dominant kingdom. Political and cultural development seems to have slowed as a result of the status quo.

=== Post-independence era ===
Mamasa Regency used to be part of Polewali Mamasa Regency, a former Indonesian Regency that used to be part of South Sulawesi but later became part of West Sulawesi province. In 2002, the regency was split into two smaller regencies: Polewali Mandar Regency which is located to the south (including the coastal region), and Mamasa Regency in the north (the mountain area). Polewali Mandar Regency is mainly inhabited by the Mandar ethnic group, while Mamasa Regency is home to the Mamasa people, who are related to the ethnic group Mamasa.

Tana Toraja Regency on eastern border of Mamasa Regency.

== Geography ==
The Mamasa Regency is located at an altitude of 600–2,000 metres above sea level. The West Sulawesi Province, with six regencies including Mamasa Regency, lies on the west side of the island of Sulawesi (formerly called Celebes). Within the West Sulawesi Province, the Mamasa Regency lies on the east-central side, with Mamuju Regency to its north and northwest, Majene Regency on the southwest, and Polewali Mandar Regency to the south. The entire east side of Mamasa Regency has a border with the South Sulawesi Province, mostly with the Tana Toraja Regency and a small southeastern border with Pinrang Regency.

== Climate ==
Mamasa has a tropical rainforest climate (Af) that closely borders a subtropical highland climate (Cfb) with moderate rainfall in August and September and heavy rainfall in the remaining months.

Climate data for Mamasa
Month	Jan	Feb	Mar	Apr	May	Jun	Jul	Aug	Sep	Oct	Nov	Dec	Year
Mean daily maximum °C (°F)	23.1 (73.6)	23.3 (73.9)	23.6 (74.5)	23.6 (74.5)	23.5 (74.3)	22.6 (72.7)	22.1 (71.8)	23.2 (73.8)	23.8 (74.8)	24.8 (76.6)	24.0 (75.2)	23.3 (73.9)	23.4 (74.1)
Daily mean °C (°F)	19.3 (66.7)	19.3 (66.7)	19.5 (67.1)	19.5 (67.1)	19.8 (67.6)	19.0 (66.2)	18.3 (64.9)	19.0 (66.2)	19.2 (66.6)	20.1 (68.2)	19.8 (67.6)	19.4 (66.9)	19.3 (66.8)
Mean daily minimum °C (°F)	15.5 (59.9)	15.4 (59.7)	15.5 (59.9)	15.5 (59.9)	16.1 (61.0)	15.5 (59.9)	14.6 (58.3)	14.8 (58.6)	14.7 (58.5)	15.4 (59.7)	15.6 (60.1)	15.5 (59.9)	15.3 (59.6)
Average rainfall mm (inches)	228 (9.0)	234 (9.2)	237 (9.3)	287 (11.3)	251 (9.9)	196 (7.7)	125 (4.9)	116 (4.6)	99 (3.9)	129 (5.1)	205 (8.1)	229 (9.0)	2,336 (92)
Source: Climate-Data.org

== Demographics ==
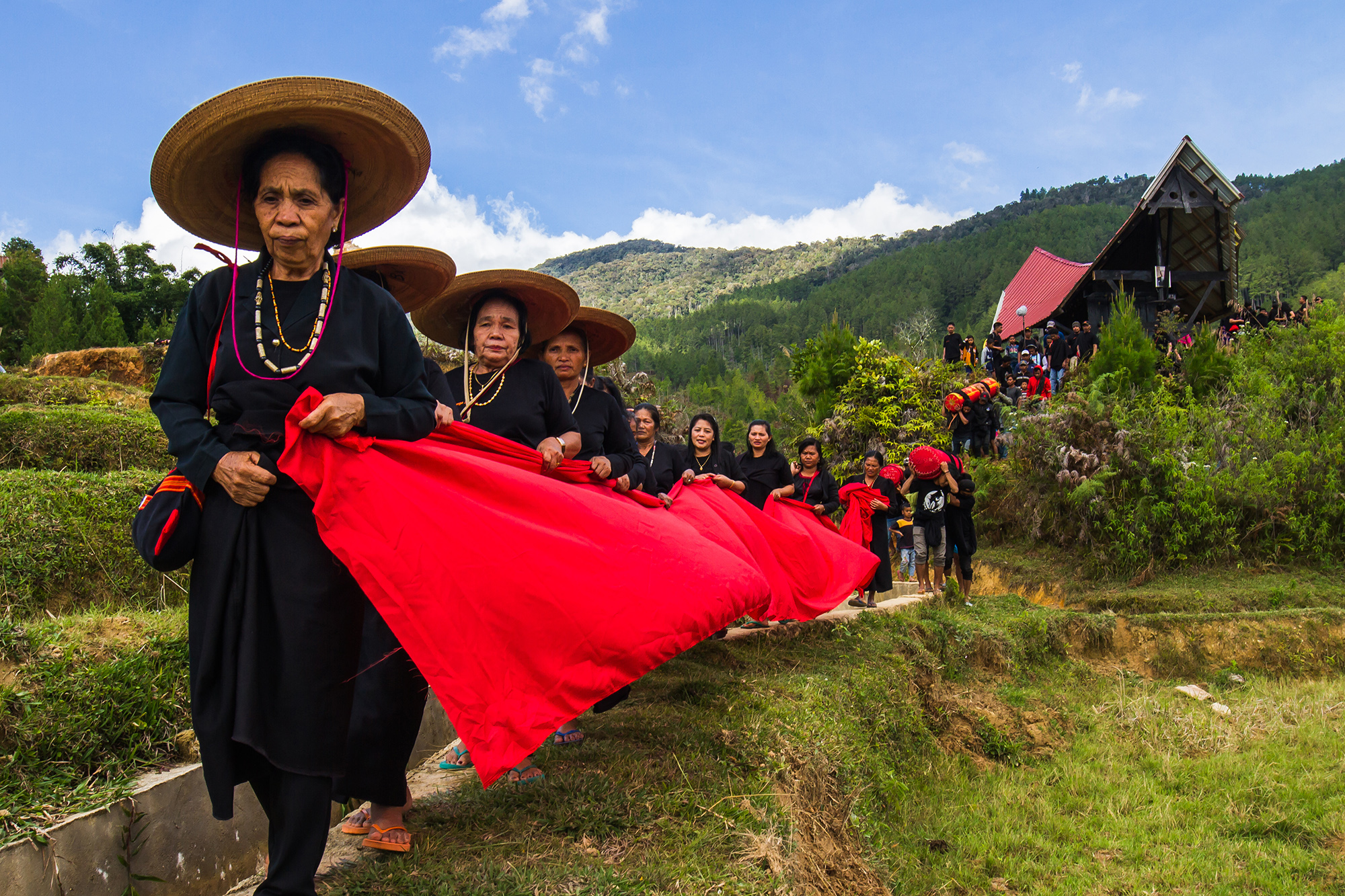
Mangngaro tradition of Mamasa people.

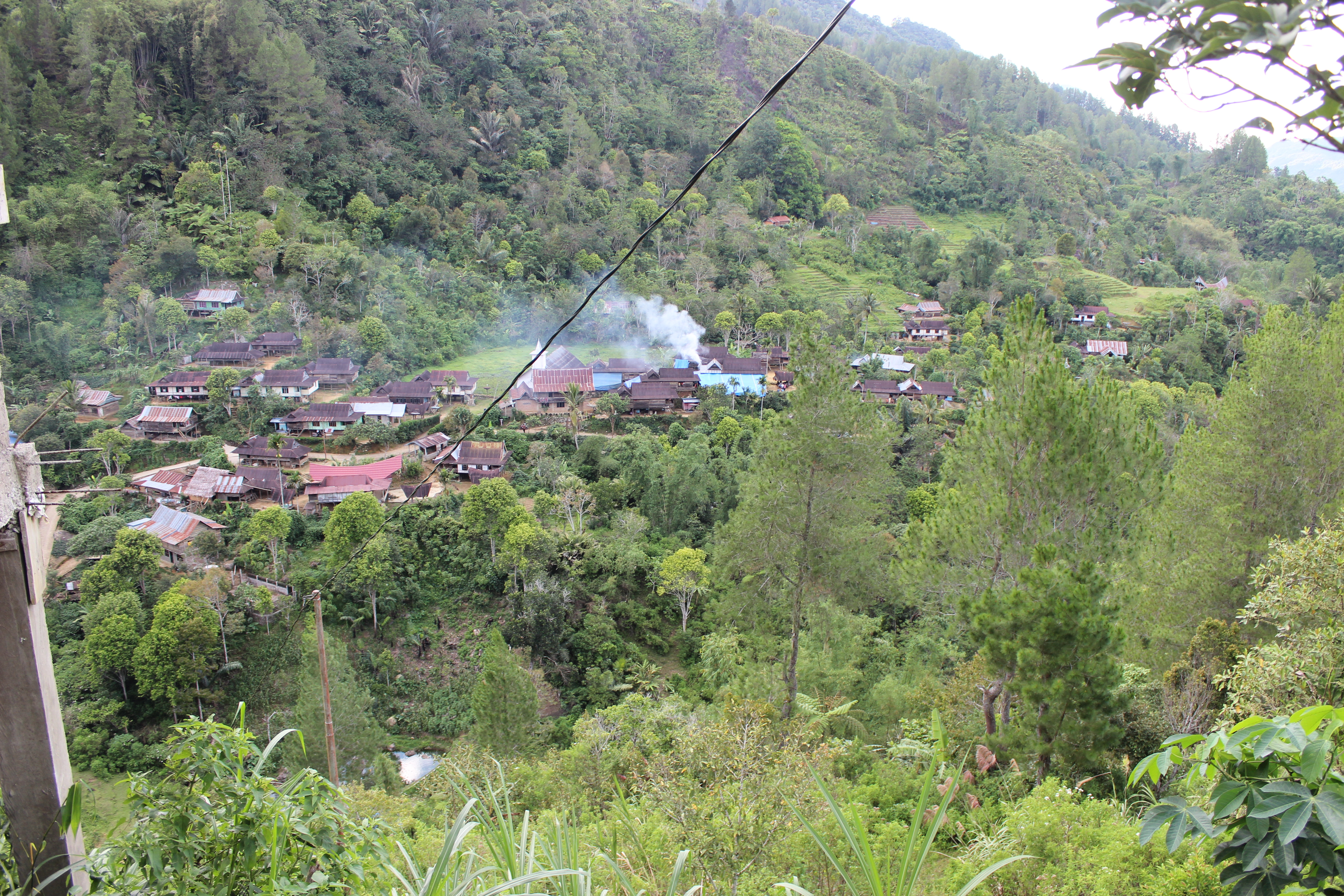
Panorama of Mamasa, main town of Mamasa District in Mamasa Regency.

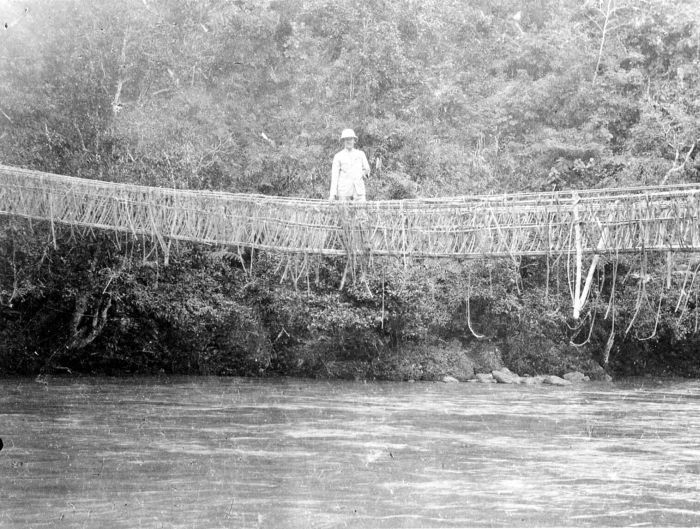
A European stands on a rattan bridge in Mamasa, Toradja Land, Celebes.

=== Ethnic groups ===
The original inhabitants of Mamasa Regency are the Mamasa people, which is a sub-group of the Toraja people. Because the province of West Sulawesi was a division of the province of South Sulawesi, some of the indigenous people of South Sulawesi also live in West Sulawesi, and their largest ethnic groups are the Bugis and Makassar. There are also other immigrant ethnic groups such as the Javanese and Balinese.

=== Religion ===
Mamasa Regency has diversity of ethnicities, religions, races and customs. Based on Ministry of Home Affairs 2020 data from Statistics Indonesia, Mamasa Regency has 77.83% Christian (74.78% Protestant and 3.05% Catholic), 17.30% Muslims, 4.85% as Hindus (1.53% Balinese Hindus and 3.34% "Ada' Mappurondo" and "Aluk To Dolo" which are the native animist belief as part of Hinduism in Indonesia).

"Aluk To Dolo" is primarily associated with the Toraja people of Tana Toraja. "Ada' Mappurondo" is primarily associated with the Mamasa people of Mamasa Regency who are subset of Toraja people. The Indonesian government has recognised Toraja and Mamasa's Pre-Christian Pre-Islamic native indigenous animistic belief "Ada' Mappurondo" and "Aluk To Dolo" ("Way of the Ancestors") as the "Hindu Alukta" a form of Hinduism. "Mangngaro traditional ceremonies" of Mamasa people of Sulawesi is a cultural practice entailing a series of activities offering spiritual gratitude to individuals or groups who have made significant contributions to Mamasa society, often involving re-wrapping the body of the deceased.

There were 795 Christian churches (646 Protestant and 49 Catholic), 129 mosques, 45 Hindu religious buildings (26 Balinese Hindu Pura temples and 19 "Ada' Mappurondo" prayer rooms).

=== Population ===
The Mamasa Regency's official estimate of population was 169,022 (comprising 87,131 males and 81,891 females) in mid 2025, having grown from 140,082 at the 2010 census and then 163,383 (83,928 males and 79,455 females) at the 2020 Census.

== Administration ==
The Mamasa Regency is divided into 17 kecamatan (districts) covering 13 kelurahan (urban villages or towns) and 168 desa (rural villages), which are listed below with their areas and their populations at the 2010 Census, the 2020 Census and at the official estimates for mid 2025. These are grouped for convenience below into two geographical sectors based on the primary drainage basins (without administrative significance).

Kode Wilayah	Name of District (kecamatan)	Area in km^{2}	Pop'n Census 2010	Pop'n Census 2020	Pop'n Estimate mid 2025	Admin centre	No. of desa	No. of kelurahan
76.03.06	Sumarorong	254.00	9,580	11,926	12,520	Sumarorong	8	2 ^{(a)}
76.03.07	Messawa	150.88	7,090	7,595	7,632	Messawa	8	1 ^{(b)}
76.03.04	Pana	181.27	8,552	9,797	9,839	Pana	12	1 ^{(b)}
76.03.13	Nosu	113.33	4,276	5,092	5,344	Nosu	6	1 ^{(b)}
76.03.10	Tabang	304.51	5,890	6,941	7,301	Tabang	6	1 ^{(b)}
76.03.03	Mamasa	250.07	22,541	26,053	26,807	Mamasa	11	1 ^{(b)}
76.03.09	Tanduk Kalua	120.85	9,984	11,514	12,090	Minake	11	1 ^{(c)}
76.03.12	Balla	59.53	6,017	7,260	7,760	Balla Satanetean	8	-
76.03.08	Sesenapadang	152.70	7,709	9,191	9,723	Orobua	10	-
76.03.14	Tawalian	45.99	6,210	8,832	8,418	Tawalian	3	1 ^{(b)}
Sub-totals	Eastern sector	1,633.13	87,849	104,201	107,434	Mamasa	83	9
76.03.01	Mambi	142.66	9,295	10,305	10,738	Mambi	11	2 ^{(d)}
76.03.11	Bambang	136.17	10,312	11,720	12,512	Galung	20	-
76.03.15	Rantebulahan Timur	31.87	5,682	6,093	6,279	Salumpkanan	8	-
76.03.17	Mehalaan	162.43	3,857	4,254	4,654	Mehalaan	11	-
76.03.02	Aralle	173.96	6,584	8,359	8,295	Aralle	11	1 ^{(b)}
76.03.16	Buntu Malangka	211.71	6,691	7,062	7,201	Sodangan	11	-
76.03.05	Tabulahan	513.95	9,812	11,389	11,909	Lakahang	13	1 ^{(e)}
Sub-totals	Western sector	1,372.75	52,233	59,182	61,588	Mamasa	85	4
	Totals	3,005.88	140,082	163,383	169,022	Mamasa	168	13

Notes: (a) Sumarorong and Tabone. (b) the district admin centre as named above. (c) Minake. (d) Mambi and Talipukki. (e) Lakahang.

== Tourism ==
Home to the Gandang Dewata National Park, several waterfalls and ecotourism locations, the regency has immense untapped tourism potential hindered by the political apathy towards developing the transport and tourism infrastructure, hence keeping the local populace in poverty.

== Transport ==
There is only one airport, no rail transport or designated national and state highways in Mamasa Regency: local transport is mainly through shared jeeps.

West Sulawesi's transportation sector shows mixed trends, with a tiny non-growing aviation sector and growing shipping sector.

=== Road Transport ===
Only 11% of roads were asphalted and the remaining 58% were very poor condition in 2013.

=== Sumarorong Airport ===
The Sumarorong Airport, Bandar Udara Sumarorong in Indonesian, developed from an earlier dirt airstrip to a 700-meter paved runway in 2012, and further expanded to a 1,500-meter runway in 2013 at the cost of IDR107 billion (US$9.5 million) for wide-body aircraft operations. Scheduled commercial flight operations ceased in 2016 due to low passenger numbers, but resumed in November 2020. Earlier, the overland transport route to the nearest major commercial hub of Makassar city used to take 8 hours, flights from Mamasa to Makasar's Sultan Hasanuddin International Airport take only 1 hour, from where international flights are available.

The nearest other airport is Tampa Padang Airport in Mamuju Regency.

== Issues ==
=== Impact of lack of transport infrastructure ===
Mamasa Regency, a mountainous region within West Sulawesi, faces significant transportation challenges primarily due to its underdeveloped road infrastructure. The mountainous terrain further compounds these challenges, making road development and maintenance particularly difficult. The area relies heavily on roads, yet a substantial portion of the network remains in poor condition. Specifically, data from 2013 research reveals that only 11% of roads were asphalted, while a concerning 58% were classified as being in very poor condition. This deficiency directly impacts accessibility and the region's tourism potential, hindering both economic activities and the daily lives of residents. Connecting Mamasa to other key areas, such as Polewali Mandar Regency, Mamuju and Tanah Toraja, is vital for trade and travel, but the poor condition of these roads severely limits the potential for growth. While research indicates a positive correlation between road infrastructure expenditure and economic growth in Mamasa, the current state of the road network acts as a significant impediment.

== See also ==
- Gandang Dewata National Park
- Polewali-Mamasa
