= Tau tau =

Effigy particular to the Toraja people in South Sulawesi, Indonesia

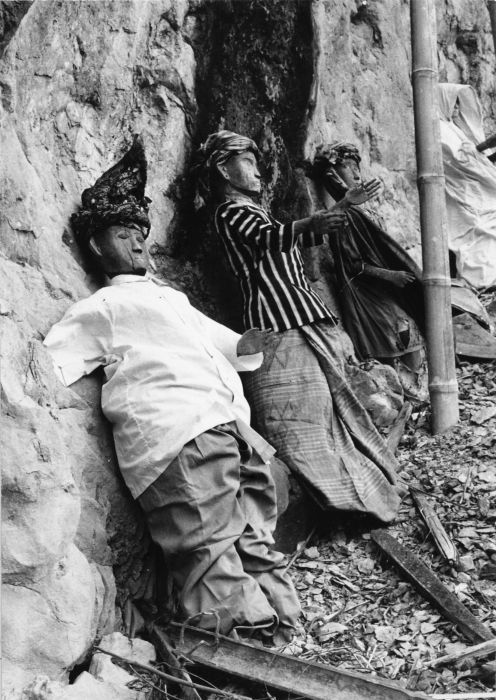
Several tau tau of Torajan noblemen, 1972

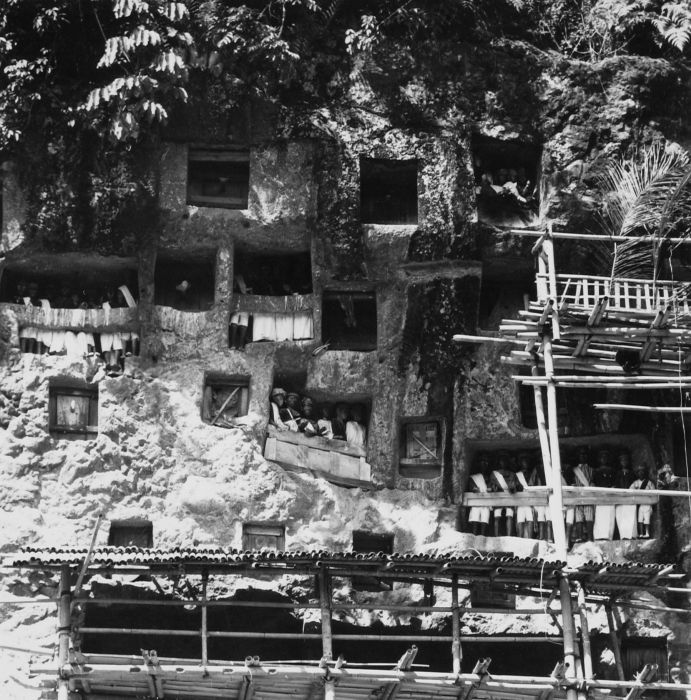
Tombs carved into the rock face near the village of Lemo. Several tau tau guarding at tomb entrance, 1971

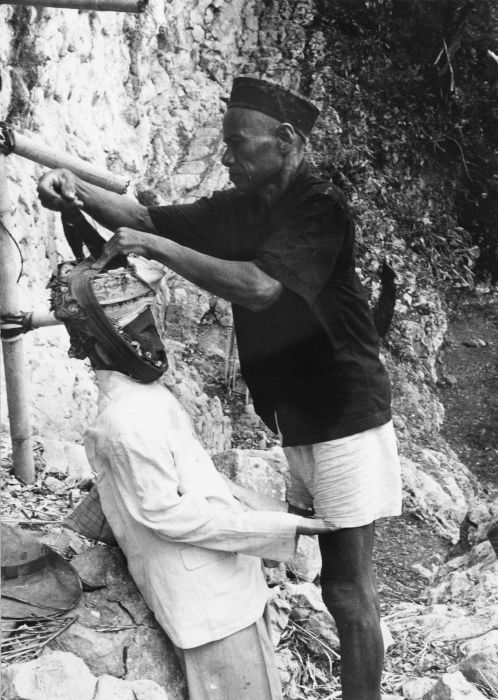
Tau tau of a Sangalla nobleman being dressed, 1972

Tau tau are a type of effigy made of wood or bamboo. They are particular to the Toraja ethnic group in South Sulawesi, Indonesia. The word "tau" means "man", and "tau tau" means "men" or "statue".

Tau tau are believed to have originated in the 19th century. They were once produced only for the wealthy, to reflect the status and wealth of the deceased. The tau tau are representatives of the deceased, ever-guarding the tombs and ever-protecting the living.

== History ==
In the early 1900s, with the arrival of the Dutch Christian missionaries in Toraja, the production of tau tau was somewhat dampened. At the 1985 synod of Toraja Church in Palopo people debated if Protestant Toraja could have tau tau at their funerals.

Torajans believe that the dead can take their possessions with them to the afterlife, and the effigies are usually equipped with small possessions. In the 1980s, the wooden effigies became a target for grave robbers who looted and possessions kept with them and sold the figures to museums. Tau tau can now be found in Jakarta, Europe and America, and were once even on display at the Smithsonian Institution in 1991.

In response to this plunder of the ancestors, the Torajans hid their tau tau in various undisclosed locations. They also installed metal fences surrounding their cave graves to protect the tau tau. It is somewhat ironic that the tau tau are meant to represent the deceased protecting the living, but they now have to be protected against the living.

Traditionally, the effigies were simply carved, only to show the gender of the deceased. However, they have become more and more elaborate, actually attempting to imitate the likeness of the deceased. Nowadays, tau tau have a photographic likeness to the people they represent. They are carved with wrinkles and carry items like Bibles.

The types of wood used for the effigies and what they are clothed in also reflect the status and wealth of the deceased. Tau tau of the wealthy would generally be made of wood from the jackfruit tree. They are usually permanent statues that can be found standing at the entrance of tombs, which are carved out of the rock faces of Toraja.

Their position, in reference to the other tau tau, in the rock face would indicate the status of the deceased. The cave builders usually require payment of several buffalos that only the sufficiently wealthy can afford. The less wealthy elites generally have their tau tau made from bamboo, which will be undressed at the end of the funeral, leaving only the bamboo on the ritual field. There are regional variations in the types of tau tau used, also.

== See also ==
- Toraja
