= Nosu =

District in the Mamasa Regency, West Sulawesi, Indonesia

Nosu is a district in the Mamasa Regency, West Sulawesi, Indonesia. It comprises seven villages and is situated in the highlands of Mamasa, the only inland regency in the province. As of the 2010 Indonesian census, the district had a total population of 4,276 people. Stunting is a significant health concern in the region, leading the West Sulawesi Provincial Health Office, in collaboration with Bank Indonesia, to conduct a public health outreach program in 2024.

== Geography and location ==
Nosu is located in the Mamasa Regency, West Sulawesi, Indonesia. The district has seven villages (known as desa and kelurahan): Batupapan, Masewwe, Minanga, Minanga Timur, Nosu, Parinding, Siwi. Nosu is situated in the highlands of Mamasa, which is the only inland regency in West Sulawesi and is known for its mountainous terrain. The region is characterized by valleys, jungles, and rivers.

== Demographics ==
According to the 2010 Indonesian census, conducted by Statistics Indonesia, the district Nosu had a total population of 4,276 people. The district covers an area of 113.4 square kilometers, resulting in a population density of approximately 37.71 people per square kilometer.

At the time of the 2010 census, the entire population of Nosu was classified as rural, with no urban settlements recorded within the district boundaries. Population and area figures were based on the district boundaries as defined in 2010, and the area calculation is derived from geospatial data compiled by the national statistics agency.

== Health ==
In August 2024, the West Sulawesi Provincial Health Office, in collaboration with Bank Indonesia, held a public health outreach program in the Nosu district focused on stunting prevention and basic medical services. The event included educational sessions attended by around 100 residents and aimed to raise awareness about stunting, a significant health concern in the region.

As part of the program, a mass circumcision service was provided for 102 boys aged 10 to 16 from remote areas of Nosu. The initiative was well received by the local community and highlighted the importance of cross-sector cooperation in improving healthcare access and addressing public health challenges in underserved districts.
