= Torajan people =

Ethnic group from South Sulawesi, Indonesia

Torajan
To Raya, To Raa, To Raja
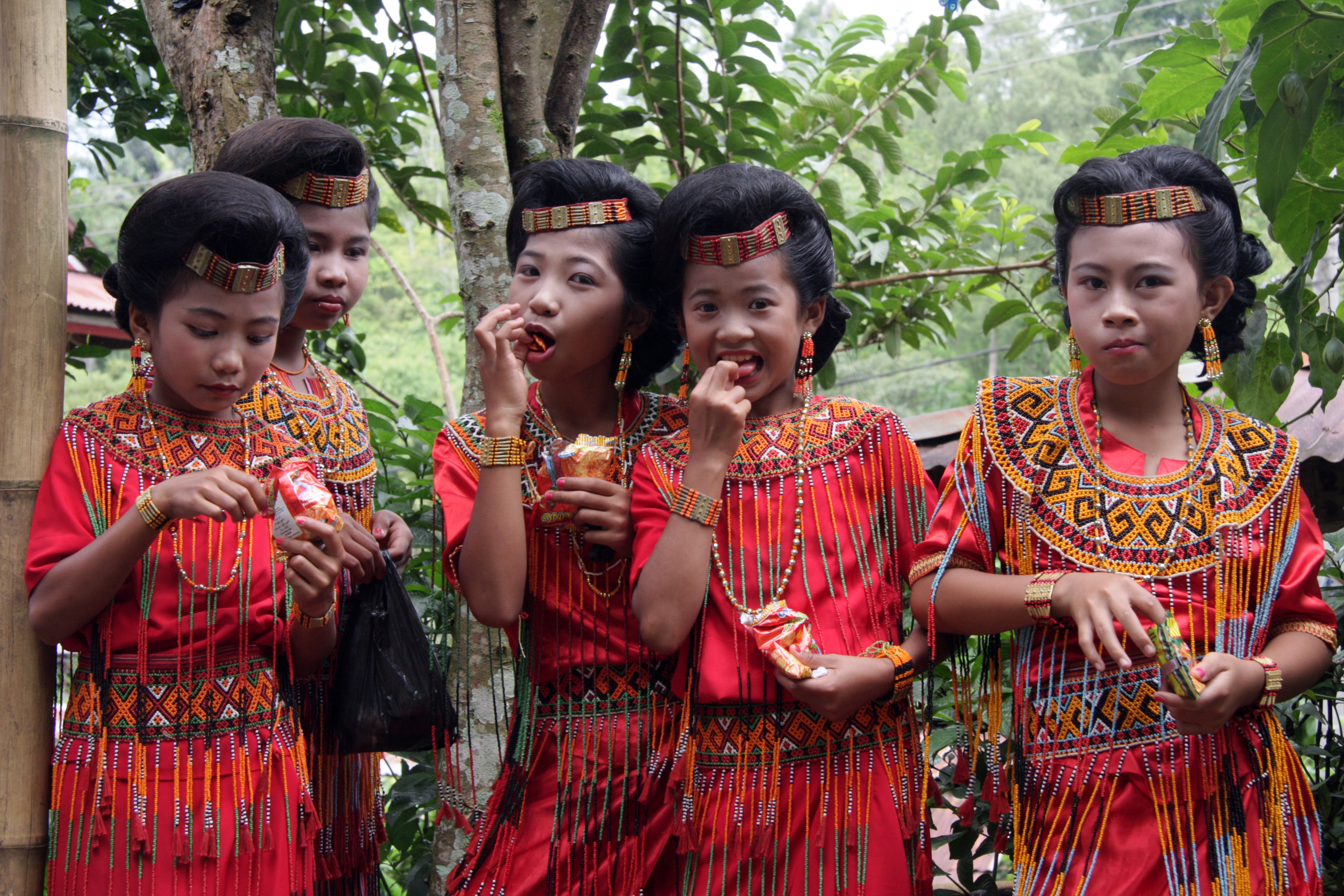
- Torajan girls at a wedding ceremony

Total population
- 1,100,000

Regions with significant populations
- Indonesia
- South Sulawesi: 600,000
- West Sulawesi: 179,846 (14% of the population; also known as Mamasa people)

Languages
- Toraja-Sa’dan language, Kalumpang language, Mamasa language, Tae’ language, Talondo' language, Toala' language (vernacular languages) and Indonesian

Religion
- Christianity 86.11% (Protestantism 69.14%, Roman Catholicism 16.97%), Islam (Sunni) 7.89% and Hinduism (Aluk To Dolo) 5.99%.

Related ethnic groups
- Talondo', Toala, Luwu, Mamasa, Kalumpang, Mandarese, Bugis, Makassar

Location of Sulawesi in Indonesia

The Torajan are an Austronesian ethnic group indigenous to a mountainous region of South Sulawesi, Indonesia. Their population is approximately 1,100,000, of whom 450,000 live in the regencies of Tana Toraja ("Land of Toraja") and Toraja Utara (North Toraja). Others live in adjacent regencies of South Sulawesi, and in the Mamasa Regency of West Sulawesi Province to the west. Most of the population is Christian, and others are Muslim or have local animist beliefs known as aluk ("the way"). The Indonesian government has recognised this animistic belief as Aluk To Dolo ("Way of the Ancestors") as well as Hindu Alukta, namely, a form of Hinduism in Indonesia.

The word Toraja comes from the Buginese language term to riaja, meaning "people of the uplands", this cognates with the Toraja language to raya/to raja/to raa which also means "inland/upland people" or "northern people". The Dutch colonial government named the people Toraja in 1909. Torajans are renowned for their elaborate funeral rites, burial sites carved into rocky cliffs, massive peaked-roof traditional houses known as tongkonan, and colourful wood carvings. Toraja funeral rites are important social events, usually attended by hundreds of people and lasting for several days.

Before the 20th century, Torajans lived in autonomous villages, where they practised animism and were relatively untouched by the outside world. In the early 1900s, Dutch missionaries first worked to convert Torajan highlanders to Christianity. When the Tana Toraja regency was further opened to the outside world in the 1970s, it became an icon of tourism in Indonesia: it was exploited by tourism development and studied by anthropologists. In 1977, Hinduism was introduced to the Torajans by a mission from Bali, in which thousands of Torajans converted to Hinduism. That number has been increasing sharply since then. By the 1990s, when tourism peaked, Toraja society had changed significantly, from an agrarian model—in which social life and customs were outgrowths of the Aluk To Dolo—to a largely Christian society. Today, tourism and remittances from migrant Torajans have made for major changes in the Toraja highland, giving the Toraja a celebrity status within Indonesia and enhancing Toraja ethnic group pride.

== Ethnic identity ==
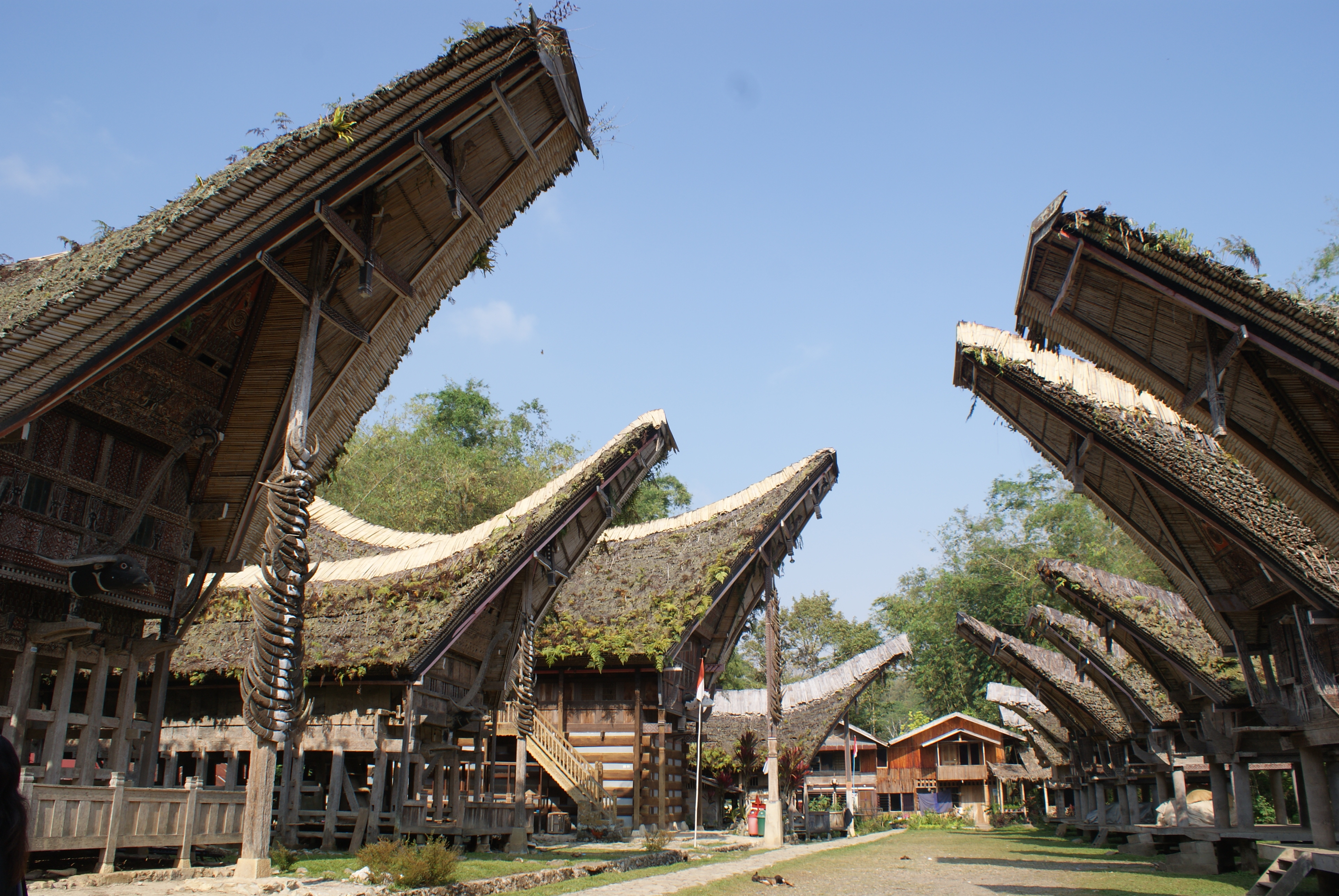
A Toraja village

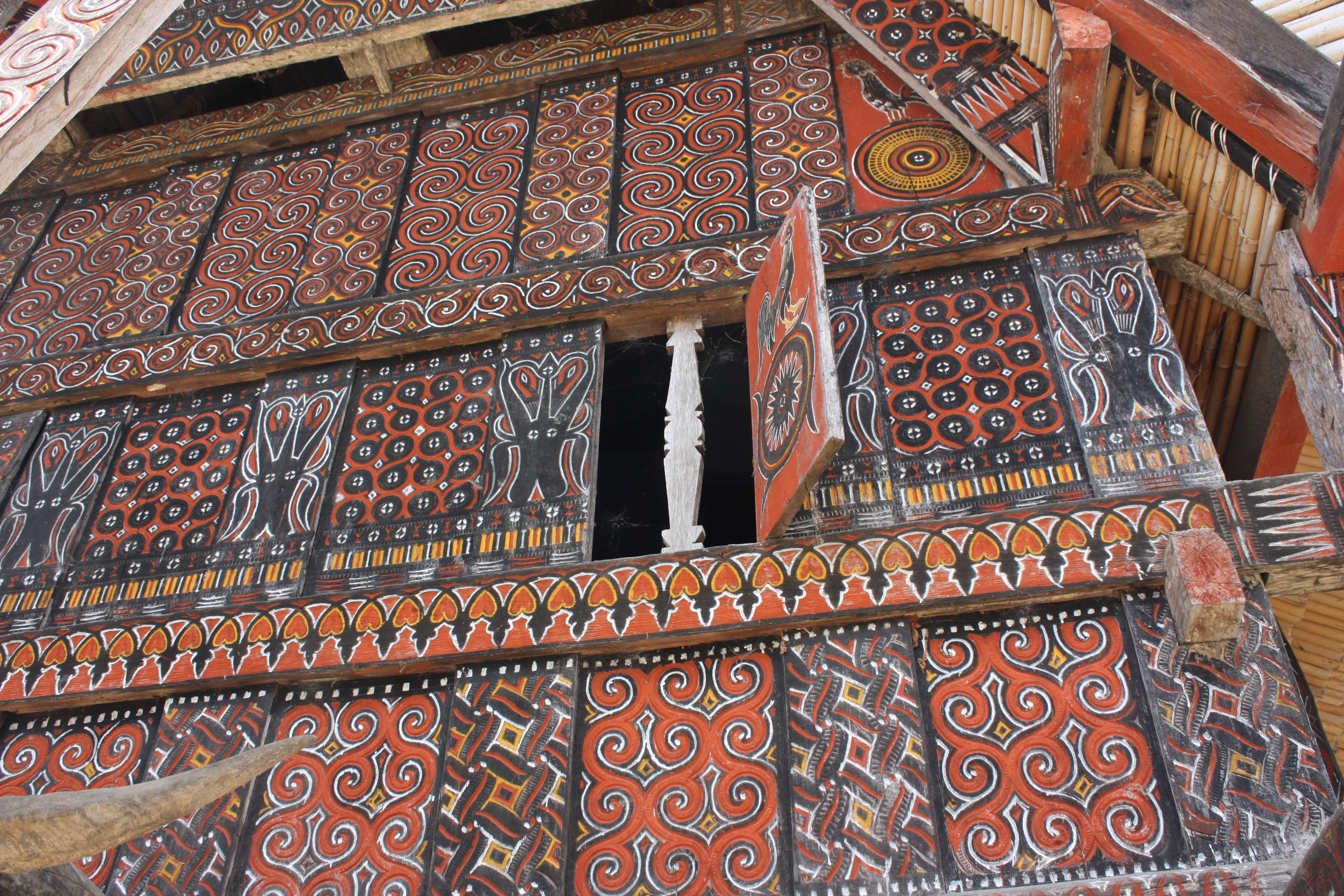
Tana Toraja, Palawa, painted front of a tongkonan house, ca. 2011

The Torajan people had little notion of themselves as a distinct ethnic group before the 20th century. Before Dutch colonisation and Christianisation, Torajans, who lived in highland areas, identified with their villages and did not share a broad sense of identity. Although complexes of rituals created linkages between highland villages, there were variations in dialects, differences in social hierarchies, and an array of ritual practices in the Sulawesi highland region. "Toraja" (from the coastal languages' to, meaning people; and riaja, uplands) was first used as a lowlander expression for highlanders. As a result, "Toraja" initially had more currency with outsiders—such as the Bugis and Makassarese, who constitute a majority of the lowland of Sulawesi—than with insiders. The Dutch missionaries' presence in the highlands gave rise to the Toraja ethnic consciousness in the Sa'dan Toraja region, and this shared identity grew with the rise of tourism in the Tana Toraja Regency. Since then, South Sulawesi has four main ethnic groups—the Bugis (the majority, including shipbuilders and seafarers), the Makassarese (lowland traders and seafarers), the Luwu of the northern and northeastern hills, and the Toraja (highland rice cultivators). A fifth group - the Mandarese (traders and fishermen) - are now essentially within the province of West Sulawesi.

== History ==
From the 17th century, the Dutch established trade and political control on Sulawesi through the Dutch East Indies Company. Over two centuries, they ignored the mountainous area in central Sulawesi, where Torajans lived, because access was difficult and it had little productive agricultural land. In the late 19^{th} century, the Dutch became increasingly concerned about the spread of Islam in the south of Sulawesi, especially among the Makassarese and Bugis peoples. The Dutch saw the animist highlanders as potential Christians. In the 1920s, the Reformed Missionary Alliance of the Dutch Reformed Church began missionary work aided by the Dutch colonial government. In addition to introducing Christianity, the Dutch abolished slavery and imposed local taxes. A line was drawn around the Sa'dan area and called Tana Toraja ("the land of Toraja"). Tana Toraja was first a subdivision of the Luwu kingdom that had claimed the area. In 1946, the Dutch granted Tana Toraja a regentschap, and it was recognised in 1957 as one of the regencies of Indonesia.

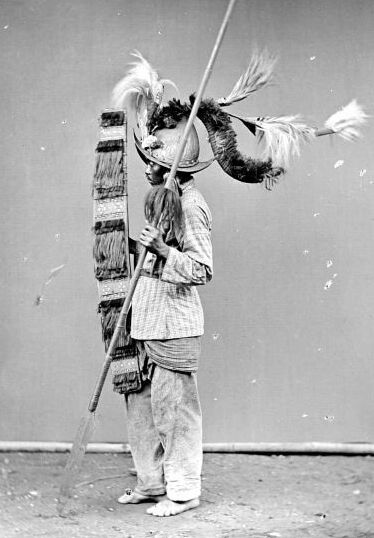
A Toraja warrior from South Sulawesi holding a spear and a traditional Kanta shield

Early Dutch missionaries faced strong opposition among Torajans, especially among the elite, because the abolition of their profitable slave trade had angered them. Some Torajans were forcibly relocated to the lowlands by the Dutch, where they could be more easily controlled. Taxes were kept high, undermining the wealth of the elites. Ultimately, the Dutch influence did not subdue Torajan culture, and only a few Torajans were converted. In 1950, only 10% of the population had converted to Christianity.

In the 1930s, Muslim lowlanders attacked the Torajans, resulting in widespread Christian conversion among those who sought to align themselves with the Dutch for political protection and to form a movement against the Bugis and Makassarese Muslims. Between 1951 and 1965 (following Indonesian independence), southern Sulawesi faced a turbulent period as the Darul Islam separatist movement fought for an Islamic state in Sulawesi. The 15 years of guerrilla warfare led to massive conversions to Christianity.

Alignment with the Indonesian government, however, did not guarantee safety for the Torajans. In 1965, a presidential decree required every Indonesian citizen to belong to one of five officially recognised religions: Islam, Christianity (Protestantism and Catholicism), Hinduism, or Buddhism. The Torajan religious belief (aluk) was not legally recognised, and the Torajans raised their voices against the law. To make aluk accord with the law, it had to be accepted as part of one of the official religions. In 1969, Aluk To Dolo ("the way of ancestors") was legalised as a sect of Agama Hindu Dharma, the official name of Hinduism in Indonesia.

== Society ==
There are three main types of affiliation in Toraja society: family, class and religion.

=== Family affiliation ===
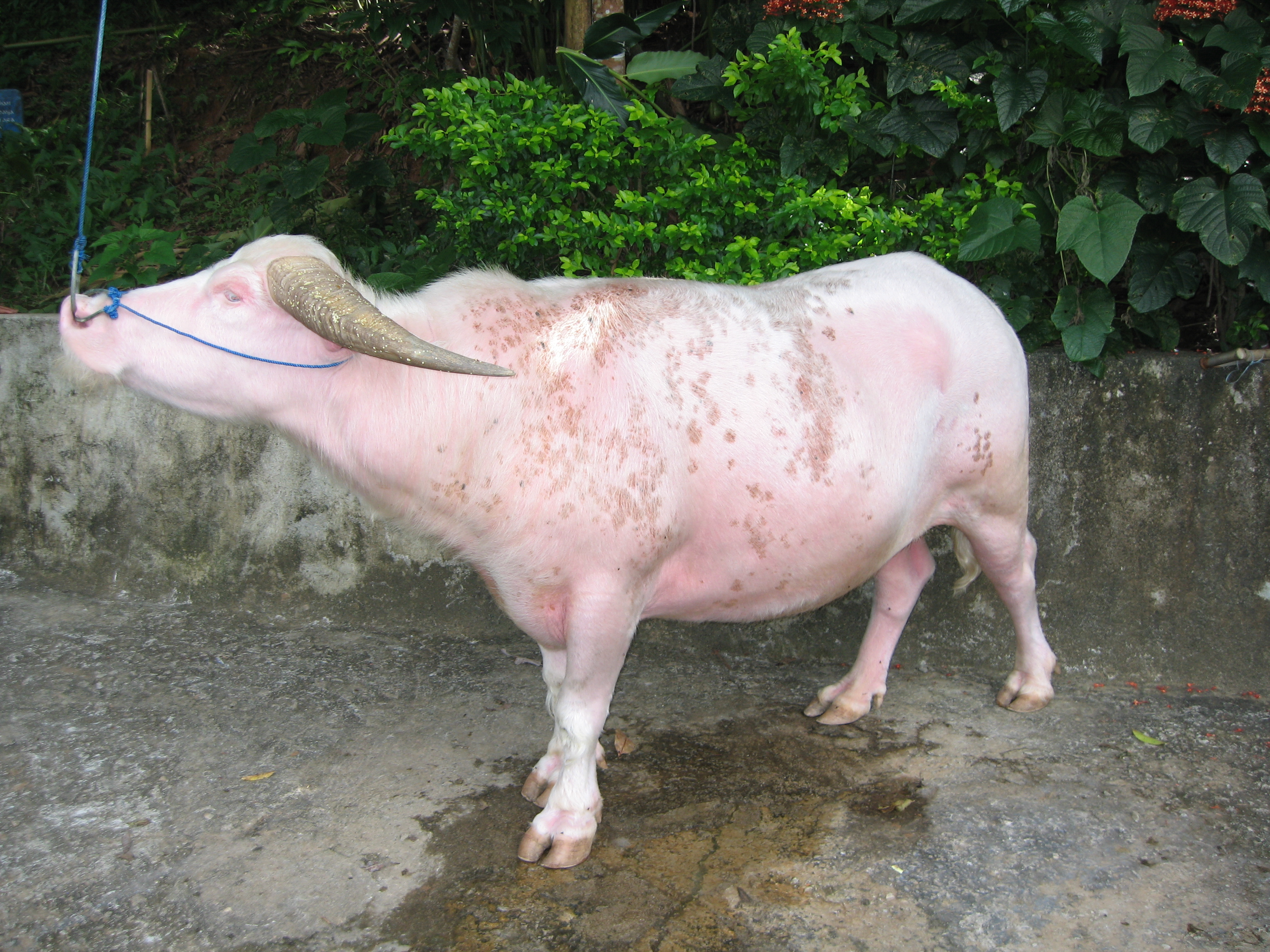
A valuable albino buffalo near Rantepao

Family is the primary social and political grouping in Torajan society. Each village is one extended family, the seat of which is the tongkonan, a traditional Torajan house. Each tongkonan has a name, which becomes the name of the village. The familial dons maintain village unity. Marriage between distant cousins (fourth cousins and beyond) is a common practice that strengthens kinship. Toraja society prohibits marriage between close cousins (up to and including the third cousin)—except for nobles, to prevent the dispersal of property. Kinship is actively reciprocal, meaning that the extended family helps each other farm, share buffalo rituals, and pay off debts.

Each person belongs to both the mother's and the father's families, the only bilateral family line in Indonesia. Children, therefore, inherit household affiliation from both mother and father, including land and even family debts. Children's names are given on the basis of kinship, and are usually chosen after dead relatives. Names of aunts, uncles and cousins are commonly referred to in the names of mothers, fathers and siblings.

Before the start of the formal administration of Toraja villages by the Tana Toraja Regency, each Toraja village was autonomous. In a more complex situation, in which one Toraja family could not handle their problems alone, several villages formed a group; sometimes, villages would unite against other villages. Relationship between families was expressed through blood, marriage, and shared ancestral houses (tongkonan), practically signed by the exchange of water buffalo and pigs on ritual occasions. Such exchanges not only built political and cultural ties between families but defined each person's place in a social hierarchy: who poured palm wine, who wrapped a corpse and prepared offerings, where each person could or could not sit, what dishes should be used or avoided, and even what piece of meat constituted one's share.

=== Class affiliation ===
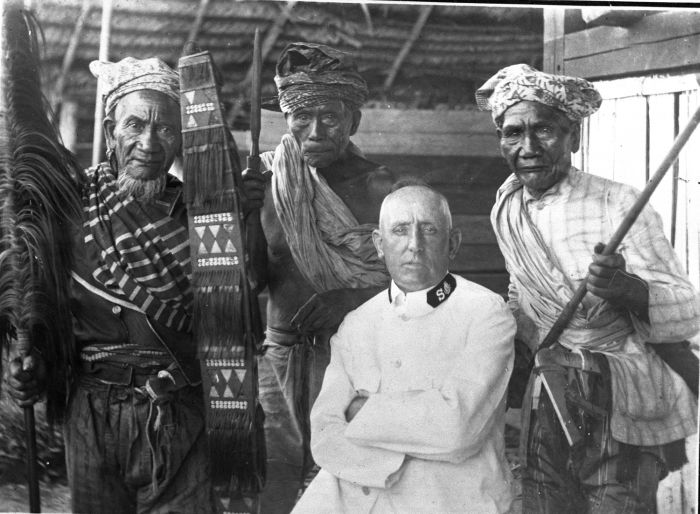
Three Toradja elders in traditional warrior garment posing with Dutch Salvation Army officer, 1930

In early Toraja society, family relationships were tied closely to social class. There were three strata: nobles, commoners, and slaves (slavery was abolished in 1909 by the Dutch East Indies government). Class was inherited through the mother. It was taboo, therefore, for a man to marry "down" with a woman of lower class. On the other hand, a man marrying a woman of higher class could improve the status of the next generation. The nobility's condescending attitude toward the commoners is still maintained today for reasons of family prestige.

Nobles, who were believed to be direct descendants of the descended person from heaven, lived in tongkonans, while commoners lived in less lavish houses (bamboo shacks called banua). Slaves lived in small huts, which had to be built around their owner's tongkonan. Commoners might marry anyone, but nobles preferred to marry in-family to maintain their status. Sometimes nobles married Bugis or Makassarese nobles. Commoners and slaves were prohibited from having death feasts. Despite close kinship and status inheritance, there was some social mobility, as marriage or change in wealth could affect an individual's status. Wealth was counted by the ownership of water buffaloes.

Slaves in Toraja society were family property. Sometimes Torajans decided to become slaves when they incurred a debt, pledging to work as payment. Slaves could be taken during wars, and slave trading was common. Slaves could buy their freedom, but their children still inherited slave status. Slaves were prohibited from wearing bronze or gold, carving their houses, eating from the same dishes as their owners, or having sex with free women—a crime punishable by death.

=== Religious affiliation ===
Religion of Torajan people
1. Protestantism (69.1%)
2. Roman Catholic (17.0%)
3. Sunni Islam (7.89%)
4. Torajan Hinduism (Aluk To Dolo) (5.99%)

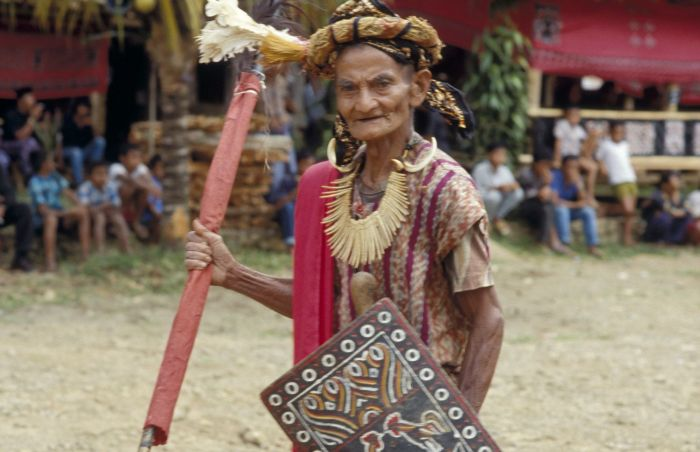
A Torajan priest during a Toraja death feast

Toraja's indigenous belief system is polytheistic animism, called aluk, or "the way" (sometimes translated as "the law"). In the Toraja myth, the ancestors of Torajan people came down from heaven using stairs, which were then used by the Torajans as a communication medium with Puang Matua, the Creator. The cosmos, according to aluk, is divided into the upper world (heaven), the world of man (earth), and the underworld. At first, heaven and earth were married, then there was a darkness, a separation, and finally the light. Animals live in the underworld, which is represented by rectangular space enclosed by pillars, the earth is for mankind, and the heaven world is located above, covered with a saddle-shaped roof. Other Toraja gods include Pong Banggai di Rante (god of Earth), Indo' Ongon-Ongon (a goddess who can cause earthquakes), Pong Lalondong (god of death), and Indo' Belo Tumbang (goddess of medicine); there are many more.

The earthly authority, whose words and actions should be cleaved to both in life (agriculture) and death (funerals), is called to minaa (an aluk priest). Aluk is not just a belief system; it is a combination of law, religion, and habit. Aluk governs social life, agricultural practices, and ancestral rituals. The details of aluk may vary from one village to another. One common law is the requirement that death and life rituals be separated. Torajans believe that performing death rituals might ruin their corpses if combined with life rituals. The two rituals are equally important.

The decline of the Toraja religion began with the Christianisation under rule of the Dutch. During the time of the Dutch missionaries, Christian Torajans were prohibited from attending or performing life rituals, but were allowed to perform death rituals. Consequently, Toraja's death rituals are still practised today, while life rituals have diminished. The traditional Toraja religion is today only practised by a small minority.

== Culture ==
=== Tongkonan ===
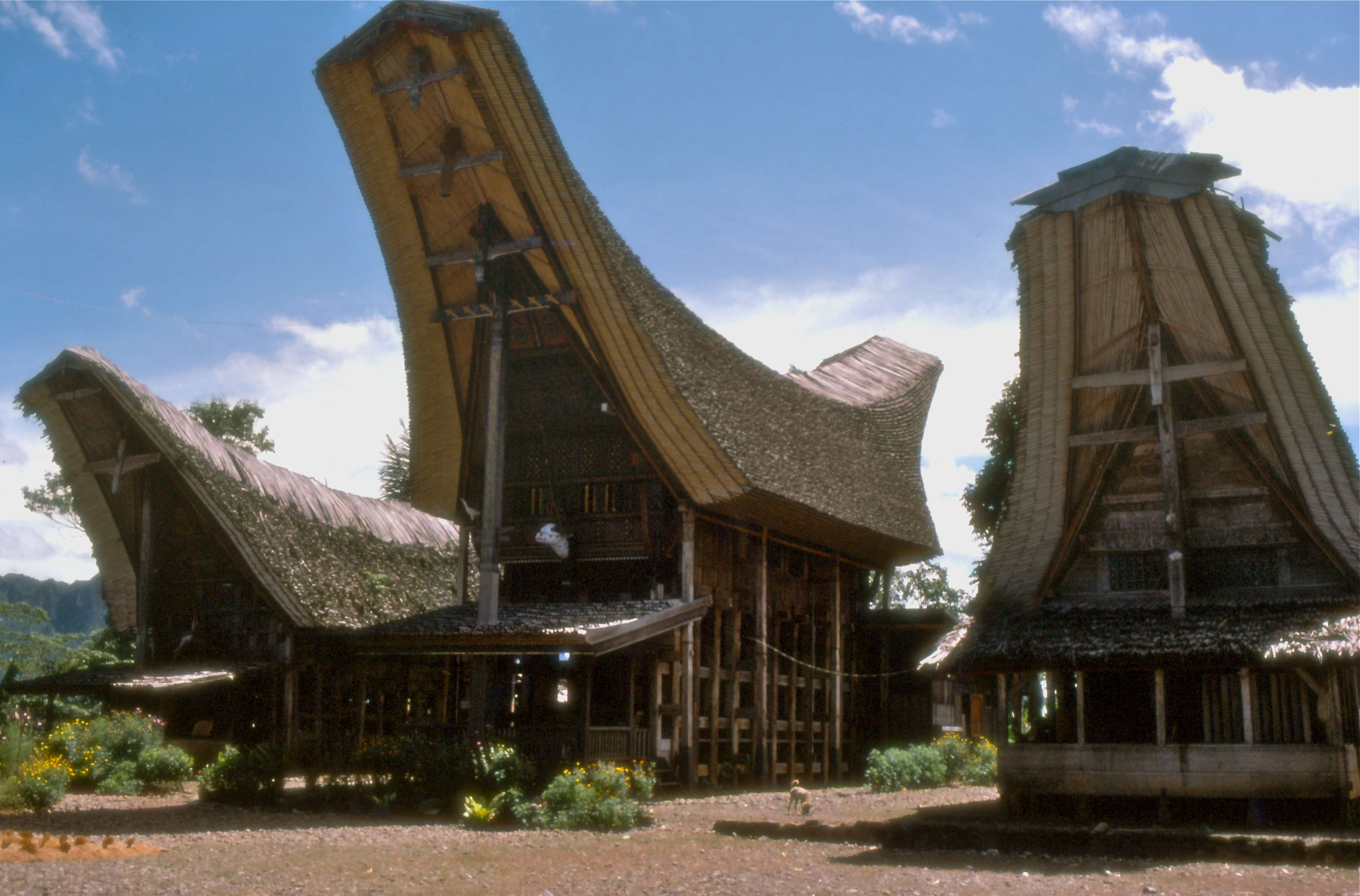
Three tongkonan in a Torajan village

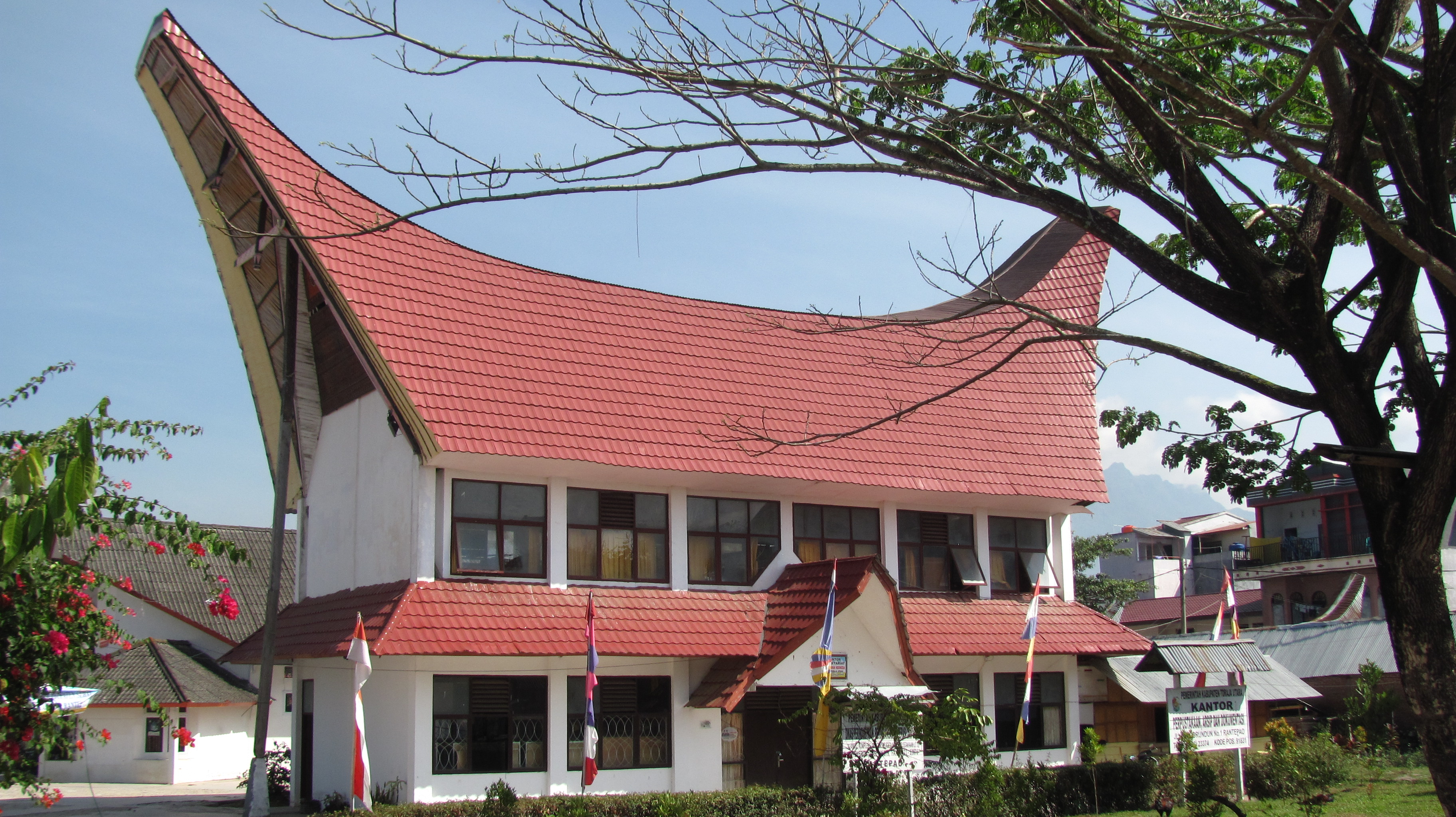
Administration building in Rantepao

Tongkonan are the traditional Torajan ancestral houses. They stand high on wooden piles, topped with a layered split-bamboo roof shaped in a sweeping curved arc, and they are incised with red, black, and yellow detailed wood carvings on the exterior walls. The word "tongkonan" comes from the Torajan tongkon ("to sit").

Tongkonan are the centre of Torajan social life. The rituals associated with the tongkonan are important expressions of Torajan spiritual life, and therefore all family members are impelled to participate, because symbolically the tongkonan represents links to their ancestors and to living and future kin. According to Torajan myth, the first tongkonan was built in heaven on four poles, with a roof made of Indian cloth. When the first Torajan ancestor descended to earth, he imitated the house and held a large ceremony.

The construction of a tongkonan is laborious work and is usually done with the help of the extended family. There are three types of tongkonan. The tongkonan layuk is the house of the highest authority, used as the "centre of government". The tongkonan pekamberan belongs to the family members who have some authority in local traditions. Ordinary family members reside in the tongkonan batu. The exclusivity to the nobility of the tongkonan is diminishing as many Torajan commoners find lucrative employment in other parts of Indonesia. As they send back money to their families, they enable the construction of larger tongkonan.

Architecture in the style of a tongkonan is still very common. Various administration buildings were built in this style in recent years, e.g. the Kecamatan building in Rantepao.

=== Wood carvings ===
To express social and religious concepts, Torajans carve wood, calling it Pa'ssura (or "the writing"). Wood carvings are therefore Toraja's cultural manifestation.

Each carving receives a special name, and common motifs are animals and plants that symbolise some virtue. For example, water plants and animals, such as crabs, tadpoles and water weeds, are commonly found to symbolise fertility. In some areas noble elders claim these symbols refer to strength of noble family, but not everyone agrees. The overall meaning of groups of carved motifs on houses remains debated and tourism has further complicated these debates because some feel a uniform explanation must be presented to tourists. Torajan wood carvings are composed of numerous square panels, each of which can represent various things, for example buffaloes as a wish of wealth for the family; a knot and a box, symbolising the hope that all of the family's offspring will be happy and live in harmony; aquatic animals, indicating the need for fast and hard work, just like moving on the surface of water.

Regularity and order are common features in Toraja wood carving (see table below), as well as abstracts and geometrical designs. Nature is frequently used as the basis of Toraja's ornaments, because nature is full of abstractions and geometries with regularities and ordering. Toraja's ornaments have been studied in ethnomathematics to reveal their mathematical structure, but Torajans base this art only on approximations. To create an ornament, bamboo sticks are used as a geometrical tool.

Some Toraja Patterns

pa'tedong
(buffalo)

pa'barre allo
(the sun and its rays)

pa're'po' sanguba
(dancing alone)

ne'limbongan
(the legendary designer)

Rasterised from

On 24 March 2022, about 125 patterns were given communal intellectual property copyright certificates by the Ministry of Law and Human Rights, in order for protecting of traditional culture expressions.

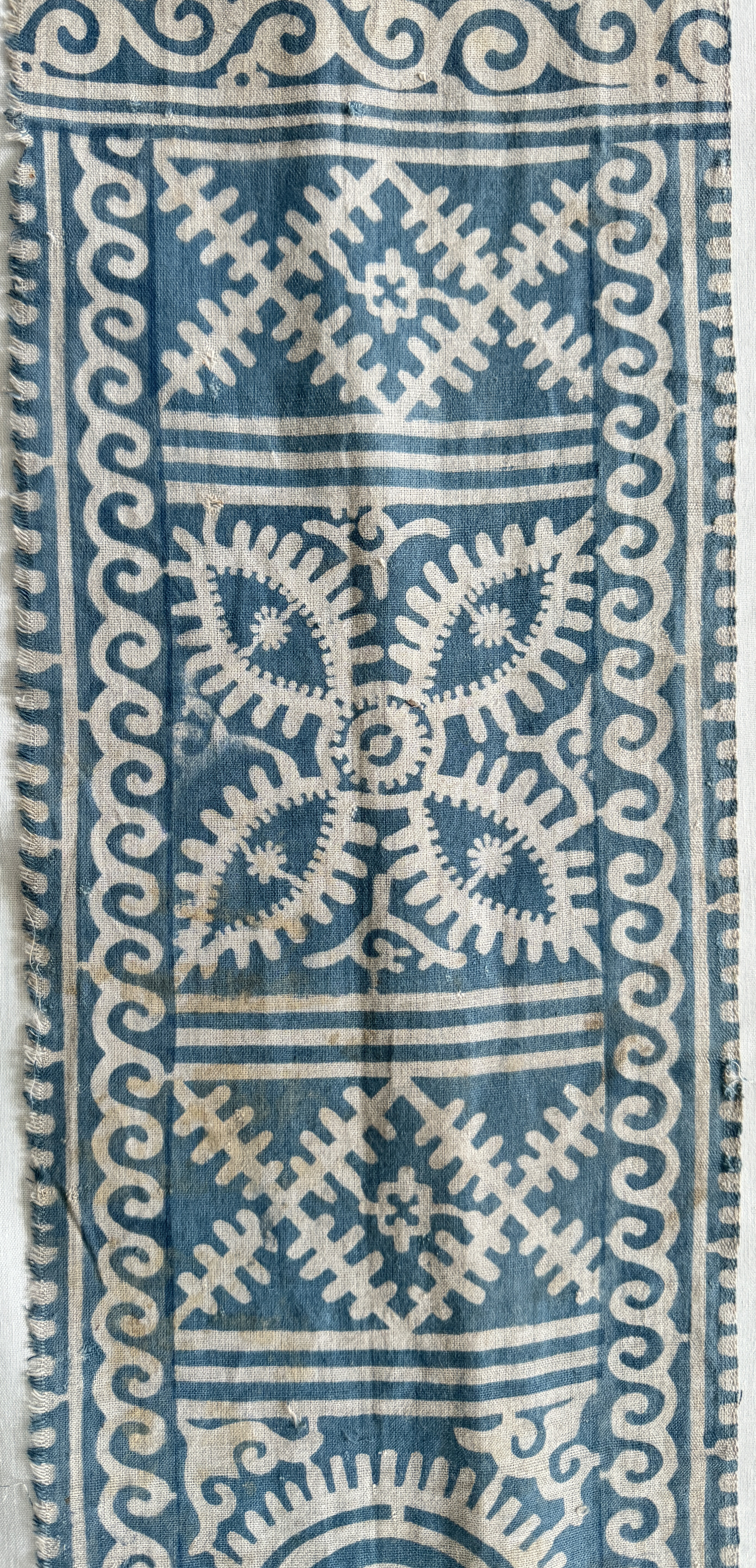
Motifs in an old Toraja Sarita cloth used as a banner in several ceremonies including funeral processions in Toraja. Courtesy the Wovensouls collection, Singapore

=== Funeral rites ===
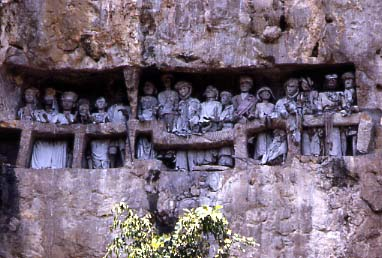
A stone-carved burial site. Tau tau (effigies of the deceased) were put in the cave, looking out over the land.

In Toraja society, the funeral ritual is the most elaborate and expensive event. The richer and more powerful the individual, the more expensive is the funeral. In the aluk religion, only nobles have the right to have an extensive death feast. The death feast of a nobleman is usually attended by thousands and lasts for several days. A ceremonial site, called rante, is usually prepared in a large, grassy field where shelters for audiences, rice barns, and other ceremonial funeral structures are specially made by the deceased's family. Flute music, funeral chants, songs and poems, and crying and wailing are traditional Toraja expressions of grief with the exceptions of funerals for young children, and poor, low-status adults.

The ceremony is often held weeks, months, or years after the death so that the deceased's family can raise the significant funds needed to cover funeral expenses. Torajans traditionally believe that death is not a sudden, abrupt event, but a gradual process toward Puya (the land of souls, or afterlife). During the waiting period, the body of the deceased is wrapped in several layers of cloth and kept under the tongkonan. The soul of the deceased is thought to linger around the village until the funeral ceremony is completed, after which it begins its journey to Puya.

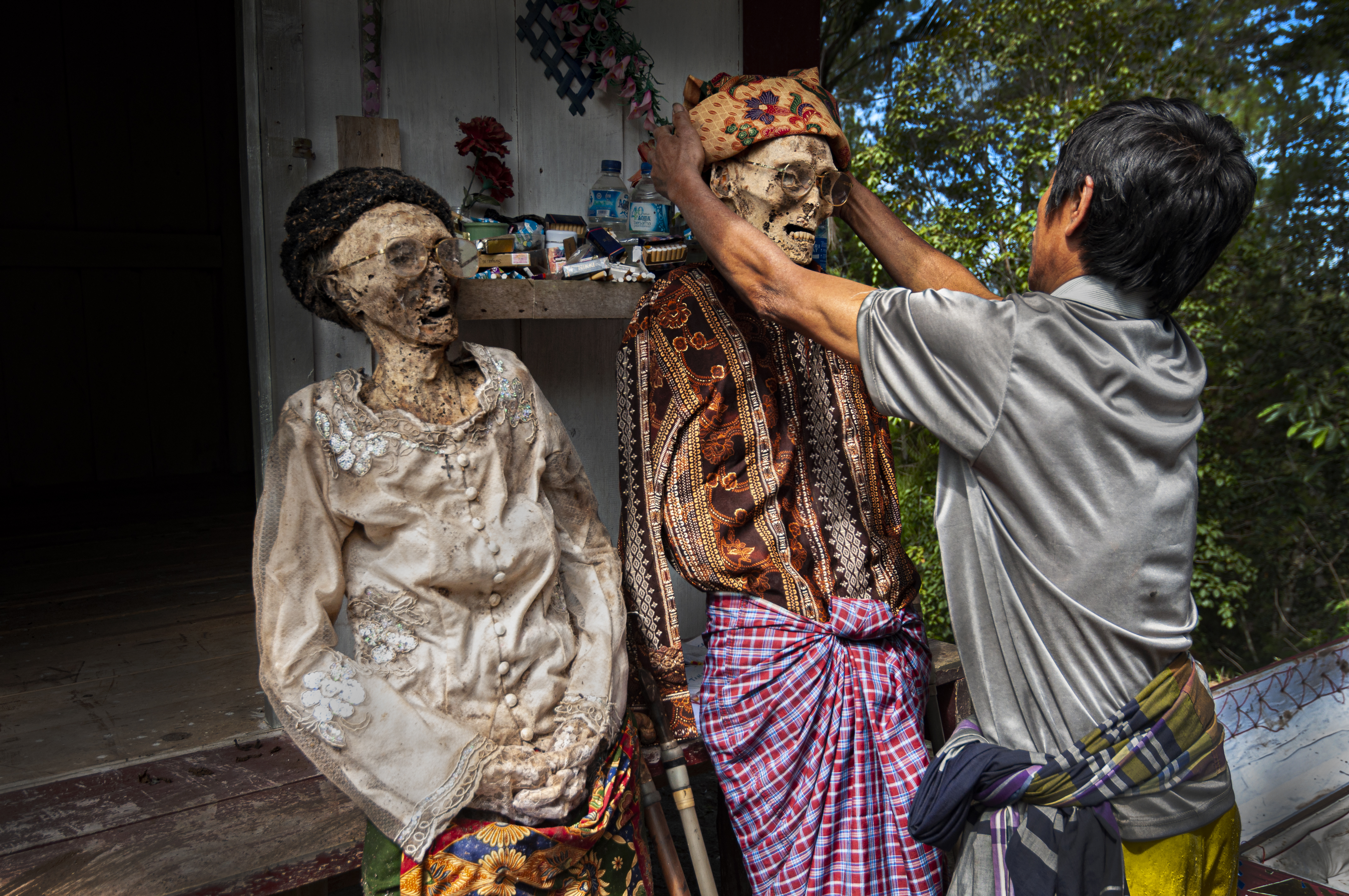
Manene tradition, which involves the changing of clothes for the deceased

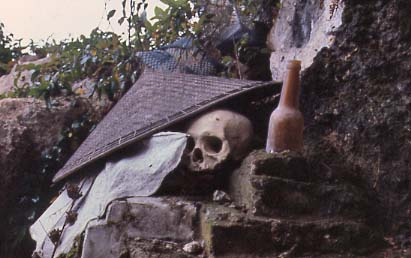
A burial site

Another component of the ritual is the slaughter of water buffalo. The more powerful the person who died, the more buffalo are slaughtered at the death feast. Buffalo carcasses, including their heads, are usually lined up on a field waiting for their owner, who is in the "sleeping stage". Torajans believe that the deceased will need the buffalo to make the journey and that they will be quicker to arrive at Puya if they have many buffalo. Slaughtering tens of water buffalo and hundreds of pigs using a machete is the climax of the elaborate death feast, with dancing and music and young boys who catch spurting blood in long bamboo tubes. Some of the slaughtered animals are given by guests as "gifts", which are carefully noted because they will be considered debts of the deceased's family. However, a cockfight, known as bulangan londong, is an integral part of the ceremony. As with the sacrifice of the buffalo and the pigs, the cockfight is considered sacred because it involves the spilling of blood on the earth. In particular, the tradition requires the sacrifice of at least three chickens. However, it is common for at least 25 pairs of chickens to be set against each other in the context of the ceremony.

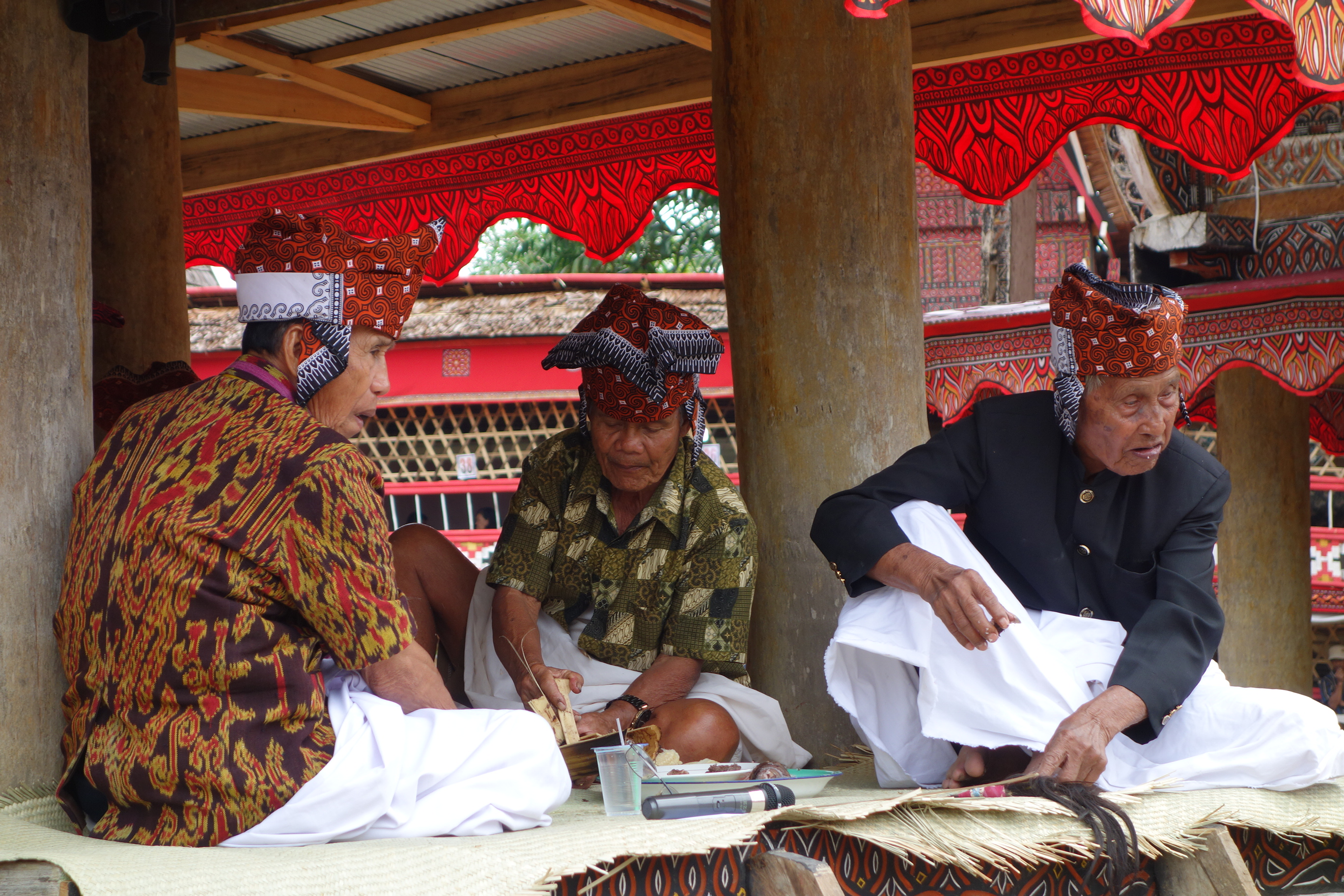
Three Toraja elders in traditional dress attending wake ceremony, March 2014

There are three methods of burial: the coffin may be laid in a cave or in a carved stone grave, or hung on a cliff. It contains any possessions that the deceased will need in the afterlife. The wealthy are often buried in a stone grave carved out of a rocky cliff. The grave is usually expensive and takes a few months to complete. In some areas, a stone cave may be found that is large enough to accommodate a whole family. A wood-carved effigy, called Tau tau, is usually placed in the cave looking out over the land. Whilst a coffin of a baby is embedded into a burrow of a living tree, so called "baby tree".

In the ritual called Ma'Nene, that takes place each year in August, the bodies of the deceased are exhumed to be washed, groomed and dressed in new clothes.

=== Dance and music ===
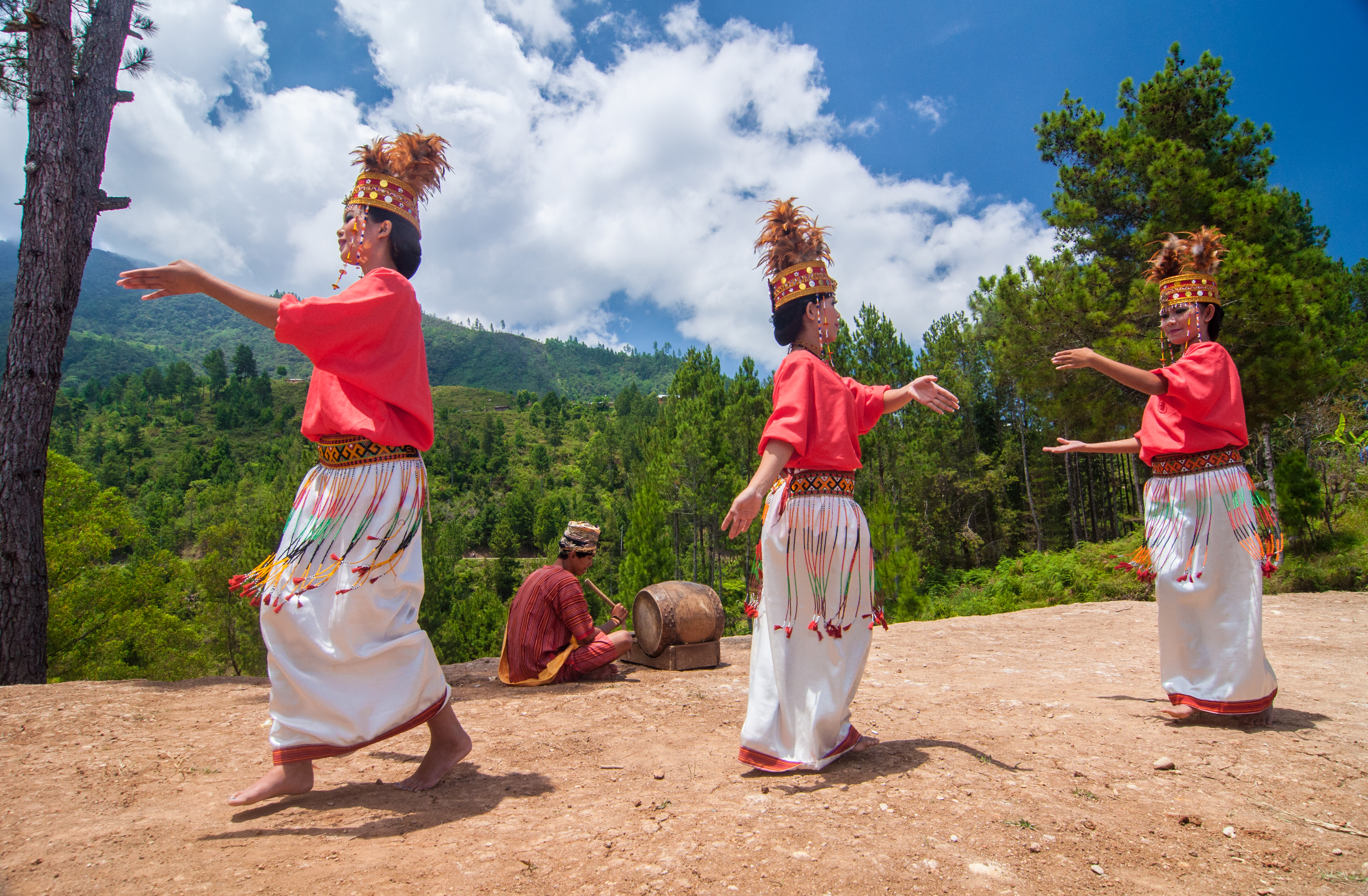
Pa'gellu dance performance in Tana Toraja.

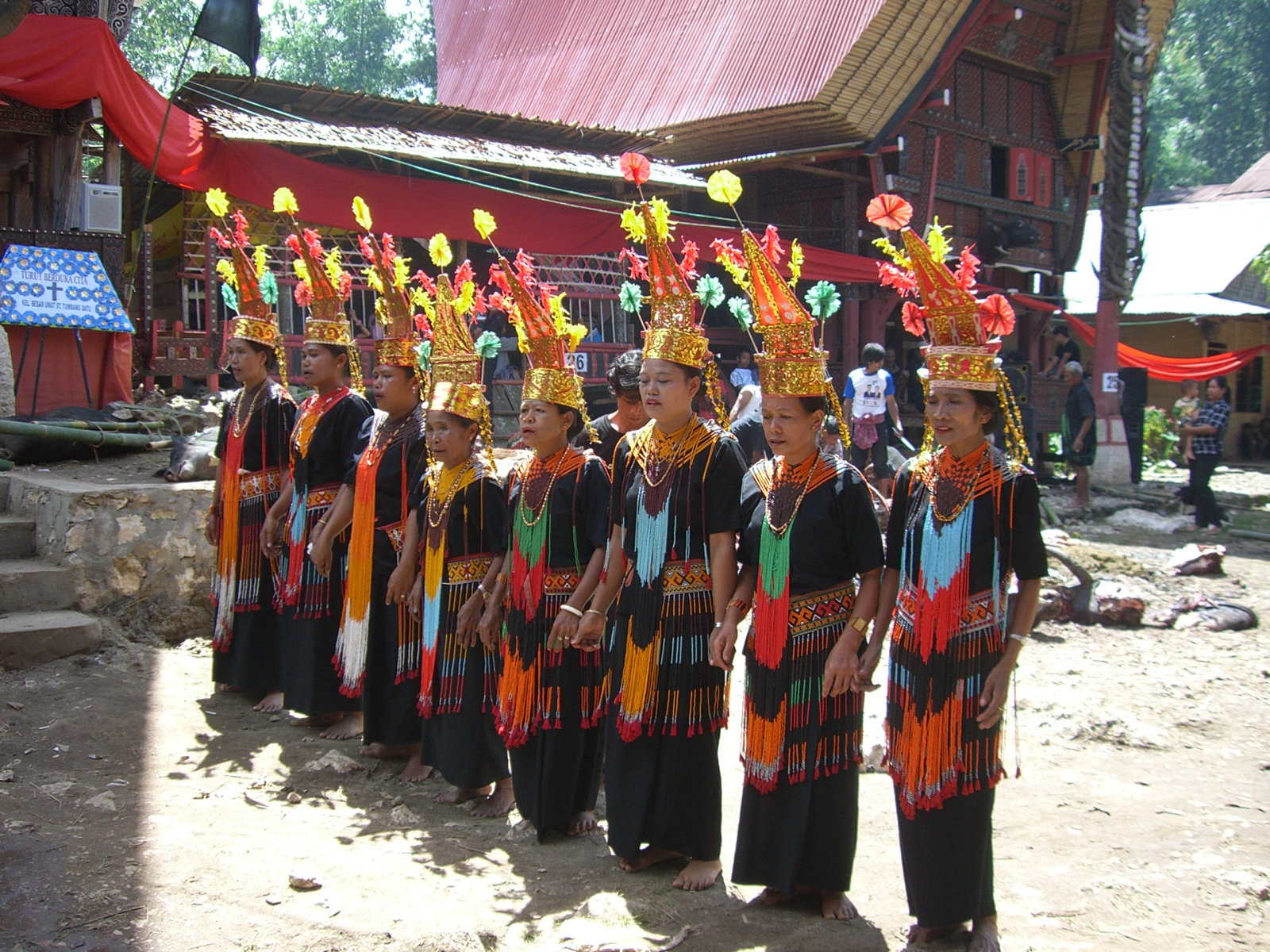
Traditional song and dance at a funeral in Tana Toraja

Torajans perform dances on several occasions, most often during their elaborate funeral ceremonies. They dance to express their grief, and to honour and even cheer the deceased person because he is going to have a long journey in the afterlife. First, a group of men form a circle and sing a monotonous chant throughout the night to honour the deceased (a ritual called Ma'badong). This is considered by many Torajans to be the most important component of the funeral ceremony. On the second funeral day, the Ma'randing warrior dance is performed to praise the courage of the deceased during life. Several men perform the dance with a sword, a large shield made from buffalo skin, a helmet with a buffalo horn, and other ornamentation. The Ma'randing dance precedes a procession in which the deceased is carried from a rice barn to the rante, the site of the funeral ceremony. During the funeral, elder women perform the Ma'katia dance while singing a poetic song and wearing a long feathered costume. The Ma'akatia dance is performed to remind the audience of the generosity and loyalty of the deceased person. After the bloody ceremony of buffalo and pig slaughter, a group of boys and girls clap their hands while performing a cheerful dance called Ma'dondan.

As in other agricultural societies, Torajans dance and sing during harvest time. The Ma'bugi dance celebrates the thanksgiving event, and the Ma'gandangi dance is performed while Torajans are pounding rice. There are several war dances, such as the Manimbong dance performed by men, followed by the Ma'dandan dance performed by women. The aluk religion governs when and how Torajans dance. A dance called Ma'bua can be performed only once every 12 years. Ma'bua is a major Torajan ceremony in which priests wear a buffalo head and dance around a sacred tree.

A traditional musical instrument of the Torajans is a bamboo flute called a Pa'suling (suling is an Indonesian word for flute). This six-holed flute (not unique to the Toraja) is played at many dances, such as the thanksgiving dance Ma'bondensan, where the flute accompanies a group of shirtless, dancing men with long fingernails. The Torajans have indigenous musical instruments, such as the Pa'pelle (made from palm leaves) and the Pa'karombi (the Torajan version of a jaw harp). The Pa'pelle is played during harvest time and at house inauguration ceremonies.

=== Cogender views ===
Among the Saʼdan (eastern Toraja) in the island of Sulawesi (Celebes), Indonesia, there are homosexual male toburake tambolang shamans; although among their neighbours the Mamasa (western Toraja) there are instead only heterosexual female toburake shamanesses.

== Language ==
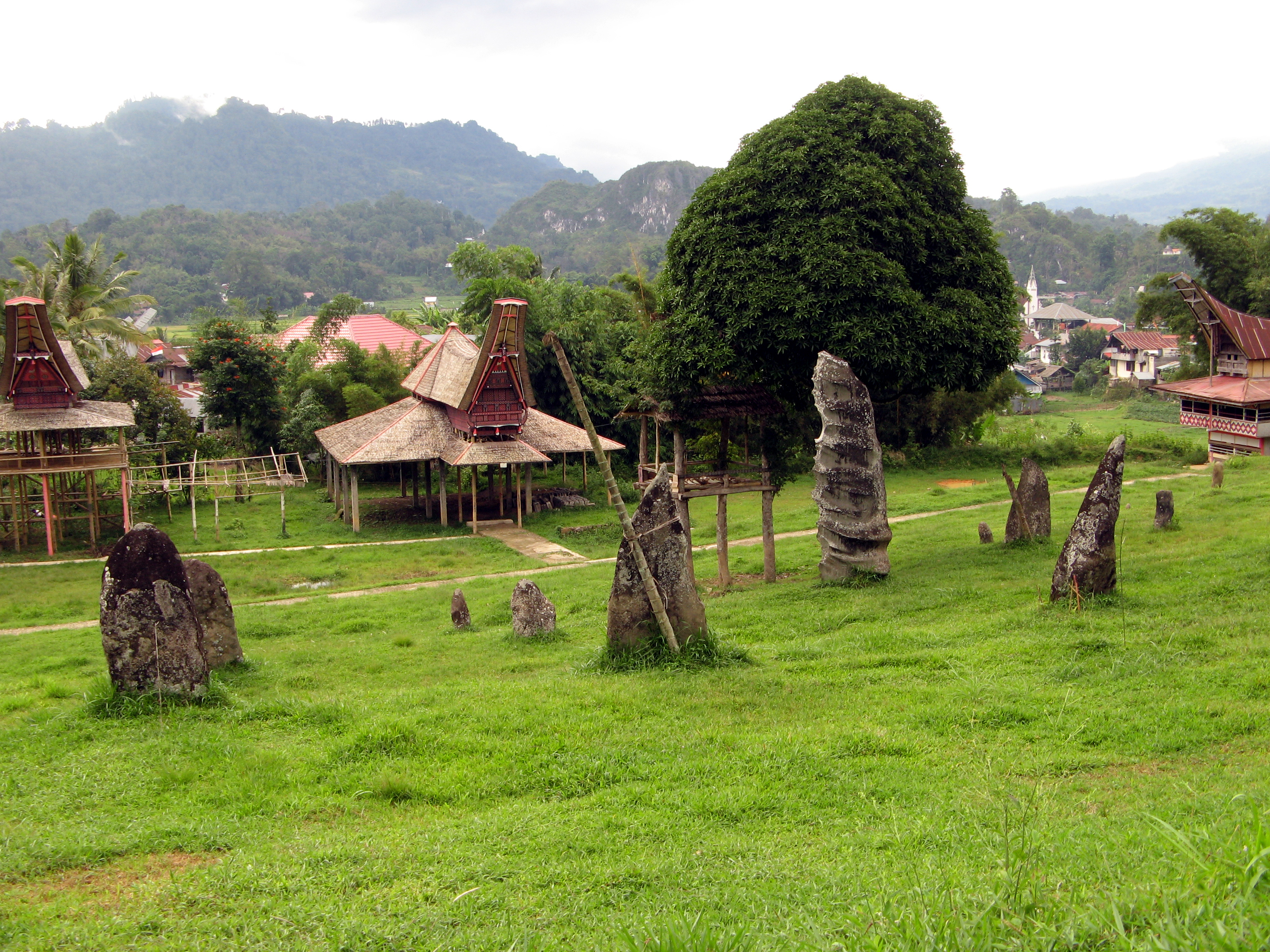
Each monolith here memorialises a particular deceased person, although the standing stones are neither carved nor signed therefore the person's name may be soon forgotten. The buildings in the background, at the base of the hill, were erected as temporary pavilions for the funeral celebrations as they may eventually be reused here, disassembled and re-erected nearby, kept up for tourist visits, or left to deteriorate, depending on local condition.

The ethnic Toraja language is dominant in Tana Toraja with the main language as the Sa'dan Toraja. Although the national Indonesian language is the official language and is spoken in the community, all elementary schools in Tana Toraja teach Toraja language.

Language varieties of Toraja, including Kalumpang, Mamasa, Tae, Talondo, Toala, and Toraja-Sa'dan, belong to the Malayo-Polynesian language from the Austronesian family. At the outset, the isolated geographical nature of Tana Toraja formed many dialects between the Toraja languages themselves. After the formal administration of Tana Toraja, some Toraja dialects have been influenced by other languages through the transmigration program, introduced since the colonialism period, and it has been a major factor in the linguistic variety of Toraja languages.

Linguistic variety of Toraja languages
| Denominations | ISO 639-3 | Population (as of) | Dialects |
|---|---|---|---|
| Kalumpang | kli | 12,000 (1991) | Karataun, Mablei, Mangki (E'da), Bone Hau (Ta'da). |
| Mamasa | mqj | 100,000 (1991) | Northern Mamasa, Central Mamasa, Pattae' (Southern Mamasa, Patta' Binuang, Binuang, Tae', Binuang-Paki-Batetanga-Anteapi) |
| Ta'e | rob | 250,000 (1992) | Rongkong, Northeast Luwu, South Luwu, Bua. |
| Talondo' | tln | 500 (1986) | |
| Toala' | tlz | 30,000 (1983) | Toala', Palili'. |
| Torajan-Sa'dan | sda | 500,000 (1990) | Makale (Tallulembangna), Rantepao (Kesu'), Toraja Barat (West Toraja, Mappa-Pana). |
Source: Gordon (2005).

A prominent attribute of Toraja language is the notion of grief. The importance of death ceremony in Toraja culture has characterised their languages to express intricate degrees of grief and mourning. The Toraja language contains many terms referring to sadness, longing, depression, and mental pain. Giving a clear expression of the psychological and physical effect of loss is a catharsis and sometimes lessens the pain of grief itself.

== Economy ==
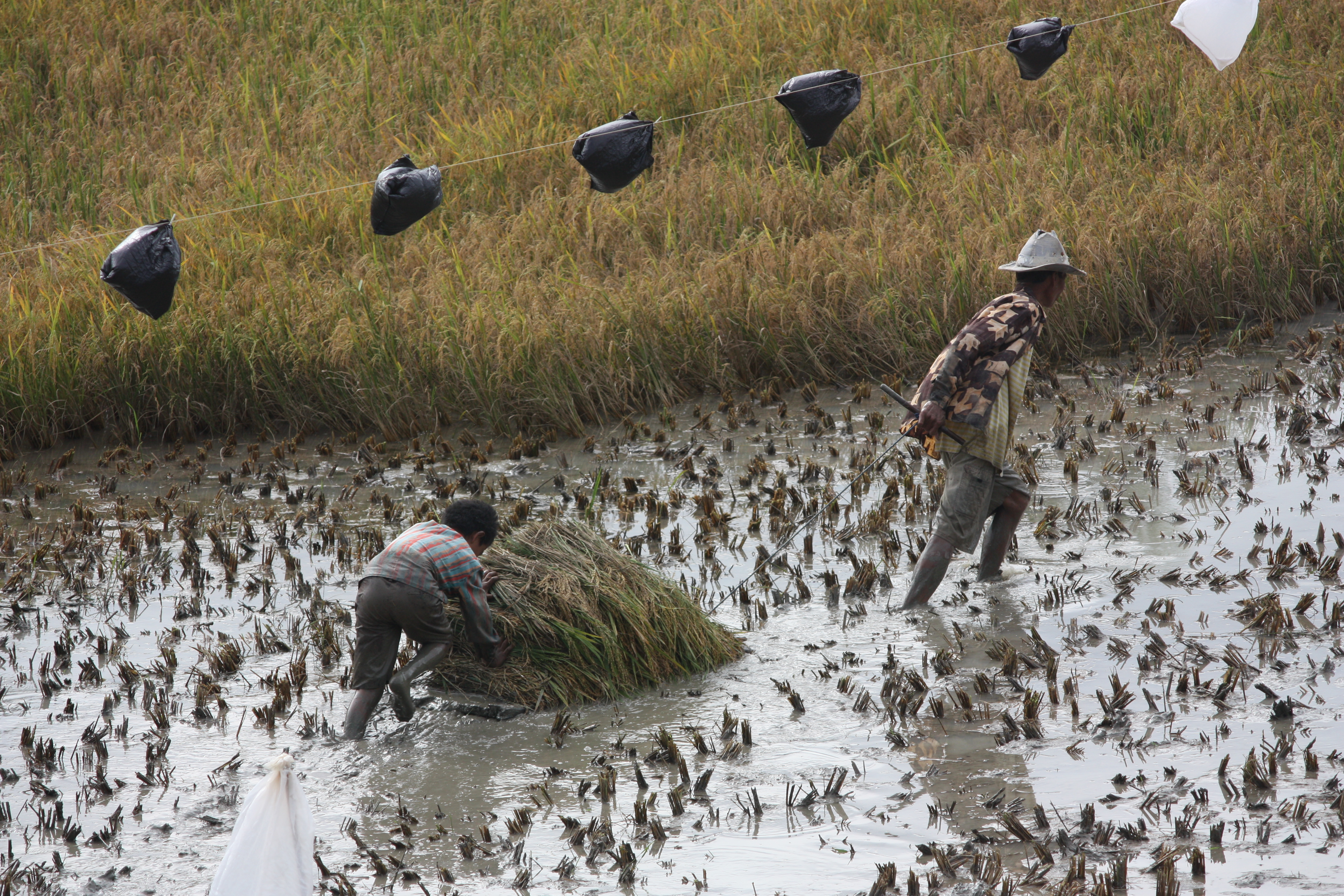
Men working in the fields in Tana Toraja

Prior to Suharto's "New Order" administration, the Torajan economy was based on agriculture, with cultivated wet rice in terraced fields on mountain slopes, and supplemental cassava and maize crops. Much time and energy were devoted to raising water buffalo, pigs, and chickens, primarily for ceremonial sacrifices and consumption. Coffee was the first significant cash crop produced in Toraja, and was introduced in the mid 19^{th} century, changing the local economy towards commodity production for external markets and gaining an excellent reputation for quality in the international market.

With the commencement of the New Order in 1965, Indonesia's economy developed and opened to foreign investment. In Toraja, a coffee plantation and factory was established by Key Coffee of Japan, and Torajan coffee regained a reputation for quality within the growing international specialty coffee sector Multinational oil and mining companies opened new operations in Indonesia during the 1970s and 1980s. Torajans, particularly younger ones, relocated to work for the foreign companies—to Kalimantan for timber and oil, to Papua for mining, to the cities of Sulawesi and Java, and many went to Malaysia. The out-migration of Torajans was steady until 1985. and has continued since, with remittances sent back by emigrant Torajans performing an important role within the contemporary economy.

Tourism commenced in Toraja in the 1970s, and accelerated in the 1980s and 1990s. Between 1984 and 1997, a significant number of Torajans obtained their incomes from tourism, working in and owning hotels, as tour guides, drivers, or selling souvenirs. With the rise of political and economic instability in Indonesia in the late 1990s—including religious conflicts elsewhere on Sulawesi—tourism in Tana Toraja has declined dramatically. Toraja continues to be a well known origin for Indonesian coffee, grown by both smallholders and plantation estates, although migration, remittances and off-farm income is considered far more important to most households, even those in rural areas.

== Tourism and cultural change ==
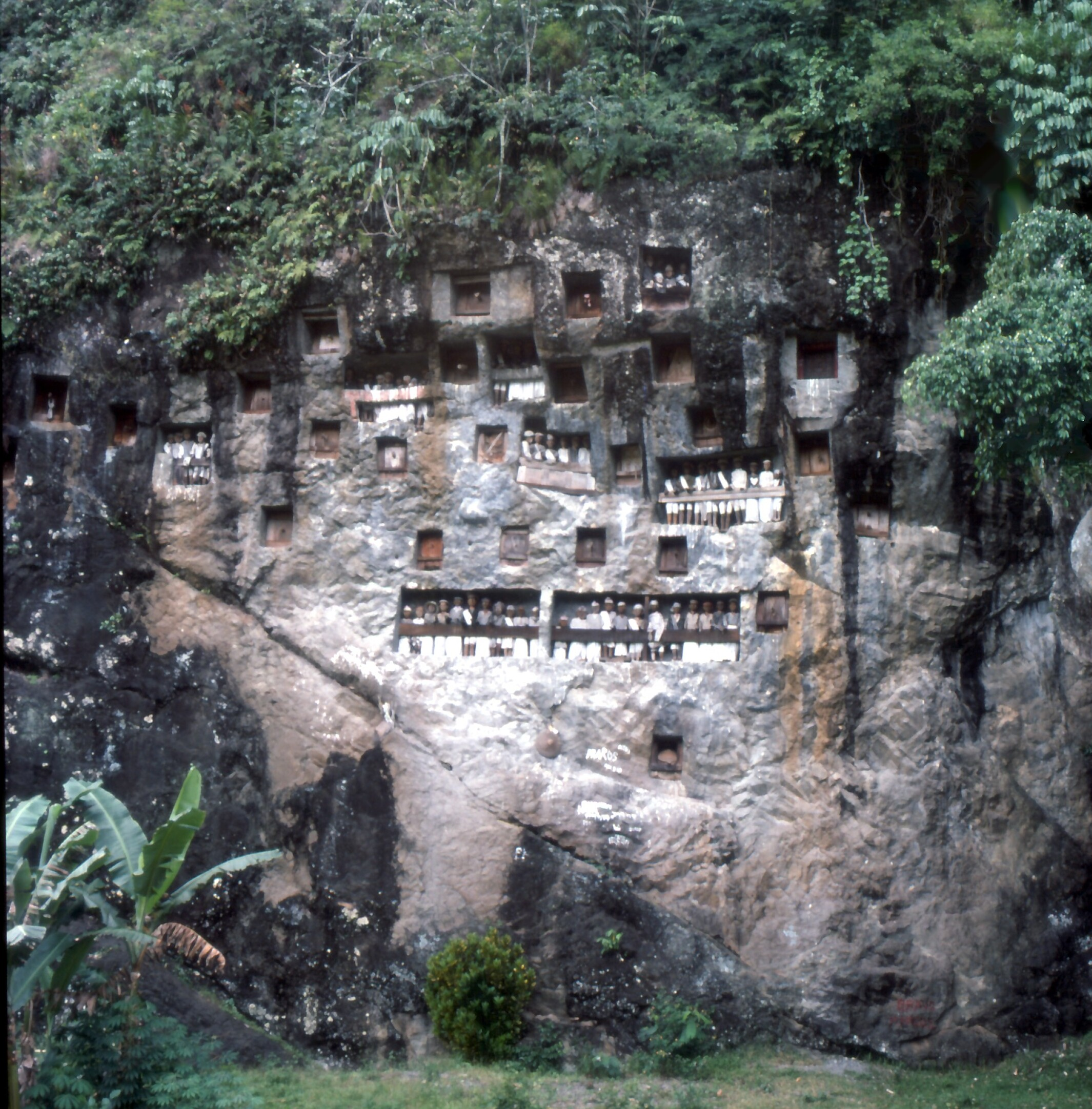
A Torajan tomb in a high rocky cliff is one of the tourist attractions in Tana Toraja.

Before the 1970s, Western tourism was almost unknown in the Toraja highland area. In 1971, about 50 Europeans visited Tana Toraja. In 1972, at least 400 visitors attended the funeral ritual of Puang of Sangalla, the highest-ranking nobleman in Tana Toraja and the so-called "last pure-blooded Toraja noble." The event was documented by National Geographic and broadcast in several European countries. In 1976, about 12,000 tourists visited the regency and in 1981, Torajan sculpture was exhibited in major North American museums. "The land of the heavenly kings of Tana Toraja", as written in the exhibition brochure, embraced the outside world.

In 1984, the Indonesian Ministry of Tourism declared Tana Toraja Regency the prima donna of South Sulawesi. Tana Toraja was heralded as "the second stop after Bali". Tourism was increasing dramatically: by 1985, a total number of 150,000 foreigners had visited the Regency (in addition to 80,000 domestic tourists), and the annual number of foreign visitors was recorded at 40,000 in 1989. Souvenir stands appeared in Rantepao, the cultural centre of Toraja, roads were sealed at the most-visited tourist sites, new hotels and tourist-oriented restaurants were opened, and an airstrip was opened in the Regency in 1981.

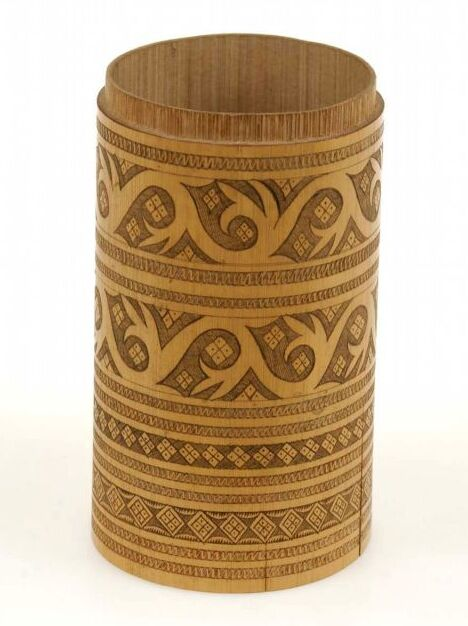
Small bamboo tobacco tube. Such handicrafts are popular with tourists.

Tourism developers marketed Tana Toraja as an exotic adventure—an area rich in culture and off-the-beaten-track. Toraja was marketed for tourists who had gone as far as Bali and were interested in seeing more of the wild, "untouched" islands. Western tourists expected to see stone-age villages and pagan funerals. However, they were more likely to see Christian Torajans wearing NBA sports caps and denim. Tourists felt that the tongkonan and other Torajan rituals had been preconceived to make profits, and complained that the destination was too commercialised. This resulted in several clashes between Torajans and tourism developers, whom Torajans see as outsiders.

A clash between local Torajan leaders and the South Sulawesi provincial government (as a tourist developer) broke out in 1985. The government designated 18 Toraja villages and burial sites as traditional tourist attractions. Consequently, zoning restrictions were applied to these areas, such that Torajans themselves were barred from changing their tongkonans and burial sites. The plan was opposed by some Torajan leaders, as they felt that their rituals and traditions were being determined by outsiders. As a result, in 1987, the Torajan village of Kété Kesú and several other designated tourist attractions closed their doors to tourists. This closure lasted only a few days, as the villagers found it too difficult to survive without the income from selling souvenirs.

Tourism has also transformed Torajan society. Originally, there was a ritual which allowed commoners to marry nobles (puang) and thereby gain nobility for their children. However, the image of Torajan society created for the tourists, often by non-aristocratic guides, has eroded its traditional strict hierarchy. High status is not as esteemed in Tana Toraja as it once was. Many low-ranking men can declare themselves and their children nobles by gaining enough wealth through work outside the region and then marrying a noble woman.

== See also ==
- Demographics of Indonesia
- Tourism in Indonesia
- Proto-Malay
- Anito
