= Pattaeʼ dialect =

Austronesian language

Pattaeʼ
- Binuang, Southern Mamasa
- Basa Pattaeʼ
- Native to: Indonesia
- Region: Sulawesi
- Language family: Austronesian: Malayo-Polynesian; South Sulawesi; Northern; Toraja; Mamasa; Pattaeʼ

Language codes
- ISO 639-3: –
- Glottolog: patt1250

Pattaeʼ (self-designation Basa Pattaeʼ or Mattulaʼ Pattae) is the language spoken by the Pattaeʼ people, an ethnic group living along the coast in the eastern part of Polewali Mandar Regency, West Sulawesi, Indonesia. Based on lexical similarity and mutual intelligibility, Pattaeʼ has been classified as a dialect of the Mamasa language, but native speakers consider it a separate language.
