= 2021 West Sulawesi earthquake =

Earthquake in Indonesia

- Location within Sulawesi Location within Indonesia
- UTC time: 2021-01-14 18:28:18
- ISC event: 619715767; 619717479
- USGS-ANSS: ComCat; ComCat
- Local date: 15 January 2021
- Local time: 02:28 WITA
- Duration: 5–7 seconds
- Magnitude: 6.2 M_{w}
- Depth: 18.0 km (11 mi)
- Epicentre: 2.976°S 118.901°E
- Fault: Mamuju-Majene Thrust Fault
- Type: Thrust
- Areas affected: West Sulawesi, Indonesia
- Total damage: 829.1 billion rupiah (58.1 million USD)
- Max. intensity: MMI VI (Strong)
- Landslides: Yes
- Foreshocks: 5.7 M_{w}
- Aftershocks: 5.0 M_{w}
- Casualties: 105 dead, 6,489 injured, 3 missing

A moment magnitude (M_{w}) 6.2 earthquake struck Majene Regency in West Sulawesi, Indonesia, on 15 January 2021, at 02:28 WITA (18:28 UTC). The reverse faulting shock initiated at 18.0 km (11.2 mi) depth with an epicenter inland, located 32 km (20 mi) south of Mamuju. It was preceded by a M_{w} 5.7 foreshock several hours prior. Shaking from the mainshock was assigned a maximum Modified Mercalli intensity of VI (Strong) in Majene and Mamuju. Four of the five regencies in West Sulawesi were affected. More than 6,000 structures were damaged or destroyed; damage was estimated at Rp829.1 billion rupiah. At least 105 people were confirmed dead; nearly 6,500 were injured and thousands were displaced.

== Tectonic setting ==
Sulawesi lies within the complex zone of interaction between the Australian, Pacific, Philippine, and Sunda plates in which many small microplates have developed. The main active structure onshore in the western part of Central Sulawesi is the left-lateral NNW–SSE Palu-Koro strike-slip fault that forms the boundary between the North Sula, and Makassar blocks and was responsible for the destructive Palu earthquake in 2018. According to the interpretation of Global Positioning System (GPS) data, the Makassar block is currently rotating anticlockwise, with its northwestern margin showing convergence with the Sunda block across the Makassar Strait. The main structure in that part of Sulawesi is the offshore, north–south trending, moderately east-dipping Makassar Thrust, also known as the Majene Thrust. The GPS data also support the presence of a seismically "locked" fault in the Makassar Strait. Seismic reflection data from the Makassar Strait supports the presence of active thrusting west of the Makassar block. The Majene/Kalosi fold-and-thrust belt is exposed onshore between Majene and Mamuju. The northern part of the Makassar Strait is interpreted as a foreland basin, with its subsidence caused by the loading of this active thrust belt.

== Earthquake ==
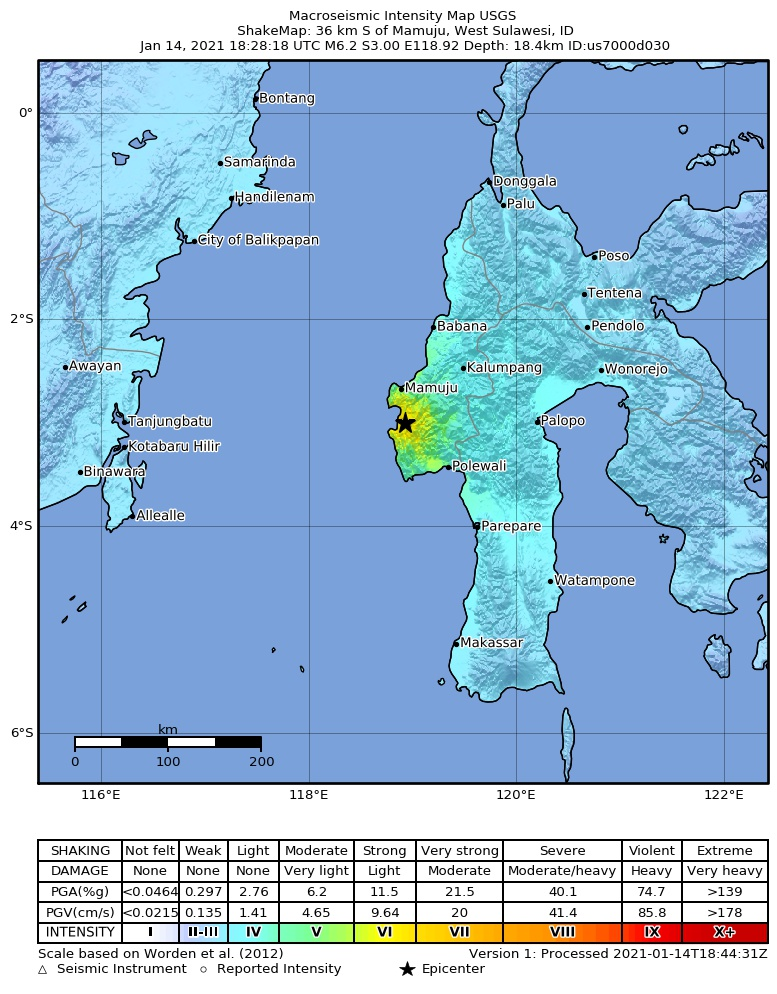
A computer-simulated Mercalli intensity map from the Advanced National Seismic System (ANSS)

The earthquake struck at a shallow depth of 18 km (11 mi) with its epicenter located in Majene Regency, West Sulawesi. The Indonesian Meteorology, Climatology and Geophysics Agency (BMKG) stated that VI (Strong) on the Mercalli intensity scale was felt in Majene for 5–7 seconds. The shaking was felt in neighboring cities, as far away as Makassar to the south and Palu to the north.

=== Geology ===
Two thrust faults lie in close proximity to the earthquake epicenter. The offshore Makassar Strait Central Fault and the Mamuju–Majene Thrust Fault. The Mamuju–Majene Thrust Fault is situated offshore and closer to the coast while the Makassar Strait Central Fault is located further offshore. Both faults slope to the east at varying angles. The Makassar Strait Central Fault dips at 20° beneath West Sulawesi. The Mamuju–Majene Thrust Fault dips at a steeper angle of 45° until a depth of 17 km, where it bends to a shallower angle of 20°.

Modelling of the earthquake using GPS data shows that this earthquake struck along the Mamuju–Majene thrust fault, which runs close to the city of Mamuju, West Sulawesi. During the earthquake rupture process, it caused a maximum coseismic slip of 0.6 meters at 5 km depth along the fault. In another academic study, the maximum slip was estimated at 1.8 meters across the fault plane at 17–21 km depth.

This fault was also responsible for a large earthquake in 1969 near Majene, which left at least 64 people dead and 97 injured. That earthquake also caused a major tsunami and landslides, damaging at least 1,200 houses. A major earthquake in the region is expected to occur every 75 years. BMKG stated that the fault was overdue for another large earthquake, as the last damaging earthquake happened in 1969.

=== Foreshock ===
Approximately 12 hours, a magnitude 5.7 earthquake struck immediately northwest of the mainshock, triggering multiple landslides and destroying two houses in Majene. The foreshock occurred at a depth of 19 km (12 mi) and was located 4 km (2.5 mi) from Majene. Shaking was recorded in Majene with an intensity on the Mercalli intensity scale of V–VI (Moderate–Strong), The foreshock was felt as far away as South Kalimantan. Dozens of people reportedly evacuated due to fears of a tsunami and one person was injured.

The foreshock reportedly caused 26 aftershocks. Two of the largest earthquakes after the 5.7 foreshock measured M_{w} 5.2 and 4.3 respectively. The 5.7 foreshock occurred along a separate fault plane located above the mainshock fault plane.

=== Aftershocks ===
Since 14 January 2021, the BMKG said 32 aftershocks had been recorded. The BMKG warned residents of possible strong aftershocks that could cause an undersea landslide, subsequently causing a tsunami. The BMKG advised coastal residents to immediately evacuate if residents felt strong shaking, citing the 1969 earthquake which struck the region and caused a tsunami. The analysis made by BMKG showed that the fault might still have adequate energy to cause another destructive earthquake in the next few days, as it may trigger the nearby faults located around the Mamuju Fault. The government of West Sulawesi later advised coastal residents to evacuate to higher grounds due to threats of the tsunami. An aftershock on 3 February killed one person and caused further damage.

Fewer aftershocks were reported in this earthquake compared to other shallow crustal earthquakes in Indonesia (2006 Yogyakarta and 2016 Aceh). This is due to the rupture characteristic where a large seismic moment is released over a small rupture area in a short period of time.

== Damage ==
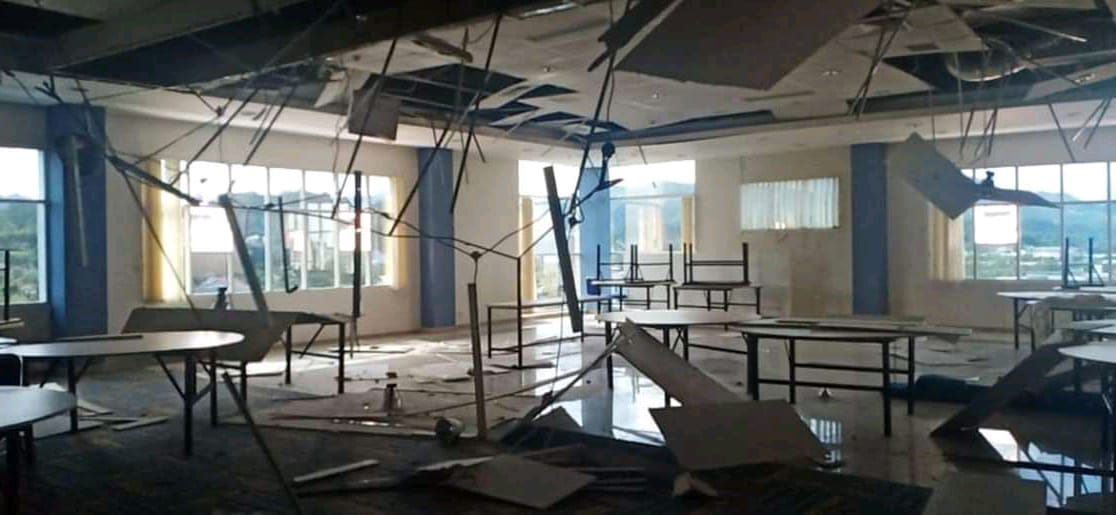
Damage caused by the foreshock

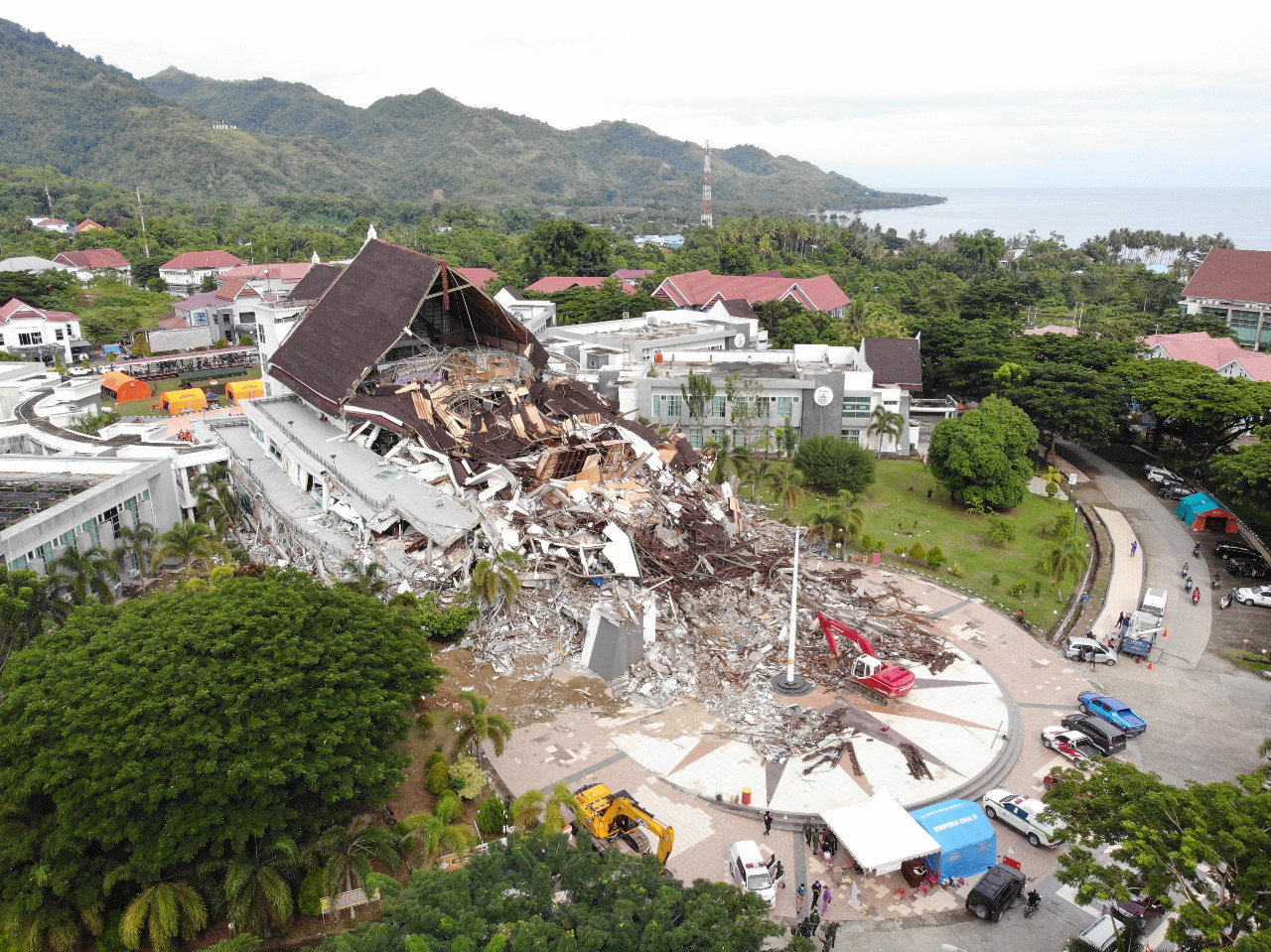
Drone view of West Sulawesi's Gubernatorial Building, which collapsed due to the mainshock

Severe damage was reported across Majene Regency and in several areas of Mamuju Regency. West Sulawesi's Gubernatorial Building, located in Mamuju, was destroyed. Two people were trapped beneath the ruins. Parts of Hotel Maleo in Mamuju also reportedly collapsed. Meanwhile, a section of Mirta Manakarra Hospital, a main hospital in Majene also collapsed, trapping at least 6 people inside. Mamuju's main hospital also reportedly suffered extensive damage, with 50% of its structure damaged. Hundreds of patients had to be treated outside of the hospital due to fear of collapse.

Telecommunications services reportedly went down and blackouts were reported as multiple power stations were damaged. AirNav Indonesia reported that its office in Mamuju Tampa Padang Airport was severely damaged. The ATC tower in the airport was also damaged. The navigational operation was diverted to Makassar ATC, while airport navigation in Mamuju was conducted in minimal effort due to the extensive damage.

The Mamuju penitentiary facility suffered damage as well, injuring at least three people. The perimeter fence of the penitentiary was reportedly destroyed. At least one Community Health Centre (Puskesmas) was destroyed. A military district office in Malunda was also severely damaged. At least two main hospitals in West Sulawesi were destroyed, while three hospitals remain operational. Further assessment revealed that three Community health centers had been destroyed.

The Ministry of Education reported that at least 15 schools were either damaged or destroyed in the earthquake, most of which were in Majene. At least one elementary school and two high schools in Majene were destroyed while the others suffered damage ranging from slight to heavy. In Mamuju, at least six schools were damaged. An updated assessment revealed that at least 27 schools in Mamuju, Majene, and Mamasa had been damaged. Seven schools and preschools suffered total destruction, while the other 20 suffered slight to moderate damage. At least three schools in Mamasa Regency were damaged. The number of damaged schools later rose to 103 as more reports came from Mamuju, Majene, Mamasa and even in Polewali Mandar. At least 37 schools were heavily damaged, including 2 schools in Polewali Mandar Regency.

Landslides were reported in Mamuju and Majene, cutting off main roads that connect both regencies. At least six villages became inaccessible due to the triggered landslides. In Majene, at least nine people were thought to be buried under a landslide. Eight were rescued alive while one person was killed. Another 3 people from the same family were killed when a landslide buried their house. Search and rescue efforts on the areas affected by the landslides were later canceled due to fears of further landslides which may endanger the lives of rescuers.

An immediate assessment made by the Regional Disaster Mitigation Agency revealed that at least 62 houses had been destroyed. The number later rose to the hundreds. In Majene, at least 300 houses were damaged. An official from West Sulawesi's Regional Government stated that at least half of all structures in Mamuju had been destroyed.

A preliminary assessment revealed that the quake caused damage amounting to more than Rp821.9 billion rupiah. Damage in Majene Regency was estimated to be as high as Rp449.8 billion rupiah while in Mamuju, damages of Rp379.3 billion rupiah were inflicted. The assessment stated that more than 7,000 homes, 21 health facilities, and numerous structures including a supermarket, a harbour, and public offices were damaged or destroyed.

== Casualties ==
Dozens of people were buried under debris, most of whom were inside their homes. The earthquake struck at night, when most people were asleep. Four bodies were found in the immediate aftermath. More than 2,000 people where then evacuated to evacuation centers and to Majene's Stadium and Mamuju's Governor's Office. Thirty-eight additional bodies were found by search and rescue personnel later in the day. Most of the victims were residents from the provincial capital, Mamuju and some in Majene. Two people were killed at section of Mamuju's Mitra Manakarra Hospital after it collapsed.

On 17 January 2021, the death toll rose to 56. The number of injured was at 826; 189 people in Mamuju Regency were severely injured and at least 637 people were slightly injured. Some severely injured survivors were flown to Makassar for further treatment.

On 19 January 2021, additional bodies were recovered from collapsed houses and buildings; others died of their wounds in hospital, bringing the death toll to 90. The number of injured rose to 932. Nearly 20,000 people were displaced.

As of 25 January, the death toll reached 105 and three people were missing. A total of 6,489 people were also reported injured, including 426 people with serious injuries and 240 with moderate injuries.

On 22 December, the Suada Mamuju Mosque which was seriously damaged, collapsed, killing one worker and burying another. The structure was about to be demolished when materials fell on the two workers.

== Response ==
=== Central government ===
The President of Indonesia Joko Widodo ordered Minister of Social Affairs Tri Rismaharini to visit the disaster area to supervise the aid distribution in the area. He later sent condolences to the relatives of the victims and hoped for a quick recovery for the survivors and those who were affected. A state of emergency was declared in West Sulawesi. President Joko Widodo later visited the affected areas and promised that the Central Government will provide more help for the regional government of West Sulawesi for the relief effort. Tri Rismaharini stated that aid and logistics will be brought from Makassar. She later ordered local members of Tagana Siaga Bencana and Layanan Dukungan Psikososial (LDP) to the affected areas. Members of Tagana were deployed to assist rescuers in the search and rescue operation. Essential goods will be distributed in multiple phases. The Ministry of Social Affairs stated that a total of Rp 1.7 billion (approx. US$1.2 million) of aid had been distributed to the people who were affected by the earthquake.

The Ministry of Transportation reassured that two airports in Majene-Mamuju would remain operational, including Mamuju Tampa Padang Airport, which was damaged in the earthquake. The Ministry of Public Works and Housing will provide clean water and sanitation for the evacuees. The Ministry of Telecommunications and Information announced that at least 122 base transceiver stations had been damaged in the earthquake. The Ministry will send a Very-small-aperture terminal (VSAT) to Majene and Mamuju. The Ministry of Religious Affairs stated that funds collected from zakat and sadaqah will be distributed to residents who were affected. The Minister of Manpower Ida Fauziyah stated that Mobile Training Unit (MTU) and Quick Reaction Unit (URC) will be mobilized to the region to ensure swift distribution of aid. The Ministry of Education stated that it will send 2 teams to Mamuju and Majene. The Ministry will set up at least two posts in Mamuju and Majene.

The Indonesian Air Force announced that it will send a Boeing 737 to Majene to assist with the search and rescue operation. Meanwhile, the Indonesian Navy will send two ships to Mamuju, including a hospital ship. Additionally, two battalions from the Indonesian Navy will be deployed to Mamuju and Majene. Excavators and other types of aid will be also given by the army.

The BNPB announced that it will send four helicopters to Majene. The Head of BNPB, Doni Monardo, will also visit the area affected by the disaster. Another three team of personnel will be sent to Mamuju and Majene from Makassar. The team will carry 10 sets of portable extrication devices for vehicle accident rescue. Indonesian National Search and Rescue Agency stated that several ships had been deployed to Mamuju and Majene. Doni Monardo stated that BNPB will send aid worth Rp 4 billion rupiah to the evacuees. It was a part of the initial phase of the earthquake's relief effort as aid and logistics will be given in multiple phases. BNPB announced that assistance of Rp 10–50 million will be given to each families whose houses were damaged in the tremor, with Rp 50 million for the houses with the most damage and Rp 10 million for slightly damaged houses.

As the earthquake happened during the ongoing COVID-19 pandemic, there are concerns that a new cluster of COVID-19 infections might appear in packed evacuation camps. The earthquake forced the postponement of COVID-19 mass vaccination in West Sulawesi due to a lack of healthcare resources, as resources were diverted to handle the aftermath of the quake. BNPB admitted that the stockpile of PPE has decreased significantly. On 18 January, BNPB announced that every evacuees, including those who evacuated to regions outside of West Sulawesi, will be tested for COVID-19. Ministry of Social Affairs later set up another evacuation camp in Mamuju's Manakarra Stadium for the groups with the highest risk of death from contracting COVID-19.

The Indonesian National Police stated that at least 136 personnel had been dispatched to assist in the search and rescue effort. Aid from the police include ambulances, solar cells and military solar kits, 15 medical teams, a team of Disaster Victims Identification (VI) unit, two gensets and four personnel from Information, Communication and Technology Division.

=== Regional government ===
The government of South Sulawesi reportedly sent logistics and personnel to assist with the search and rescue effort in Majene and Mamuju, but it was hampered as the roads to Majene and Mamuju were cut off due to the earthquake. Logistics were later sent via sea transport. The governor of South Sulawesi province, Nurdin Abdullah, will visit Majene to observe the damage in the area and to assist with the search and rescue operation. He later stated that South Sulawesi will accept evacuees from Majene and Mamuju. The city of Palopo will send logistics and will deploy 18 medical personnel and 8 firefighters to West Sulawesi. Bone Regency and Takalar Regency, both located in South Sulawesi, sent truckloads of aid to West Sulawesi. Government of Luwu Regency and Surabaya also sent humanitarian aid to West Sulawesi, while the government of Bengkulu set up a fundraiser for the victims. The government of Central Java sent 15 volunteers to the disaster area.

The Regional Police of South Sulawesi also sent personnel, water treatment equipment, and other kinds of aid to Mamuju and Majene to assist the relief effort. Central Sulawesi Regional Police sent 30 Mobile Brigade Corps (Brimob) and medical team to nearby Mamuju and Majene in West Sulawesi for the relief effort.

The West Sulawesi Regional Disaster Agency stated that the search and rescue effort in Mamuju was overwhelmed due to a lack of personnel. Search and rescue personnel initially had been dispatched to the nearby Polewali Mandar Regency as a flash flood had just struck the area. Additional personnel was called from Balikpapan, Jakarta, and Makassar to assist with the search and rescue operation. The lack of heavy equipment also hampered the search and rescue effort.

=== Others ===
The National Democratic (Nasdem) Party of Central Sulawesi sent logistics from Palu, including 1,500 face masks and 15 units of tents. The party will also send five trucks filled with at least six tonnes of aid. West Sulawesi's Regional Representative Council from Indonesian Democratic Party of Struggle (PDIP) announced that the party will also send logistics and essential goods for setting up a community kitchen. The party will also deploy ambulances and vehicular support for the relief effort. The Chairman of Golkar Party, Airlangga Hartarto, and Chairman of National Mandate Party, Zulkifli Hasan, ordered their parties' cadres from West Sulawesi to visit the area affected by the earthquake to assist the relief effort, while the Democratic Party asked the Indonesian central government to evaluate the disaster mitigation system and post-disaster relief effort.

The National Electric Company (PLN) stated that, as of the afternoon of 15 January 2021, at least 460 power stations out of 872 have been repaired. Hundreds of PLN personnel had been dispatched to the disaster area. PLN stated that additional personnel will be called from neighboring cities including Parepare, Palopo, Palu, and Pinrang Regency. As of 16 January, PLN reported that at least 63% of the power grids in the affected area had been restored. Electricity was fully restored on 5 February, nearly a month after the earthquake.

The Indonesian state-owned petrol company Pertamina ensured that the fuel and gas supplies in Mamuju and Majene were enough. To ensure that no kinds of fuel shortages would occur, Pertamina will send two Mobile Storage Units with a capacity of 16 kg in each unit. Seven fuel trucks will be sent from Donggala Regency. Logistics and additional personnel will also be sent to the affected areas.

The head of the Indonesian Red Cross and former Indonesian Vice President Jusuf Kalla stated that they will send personnel from Palu and Makassar to the area. Family kits and other basic needs were also sent to Mamuju and Majene. An assessment team and 10 doctors from Hasanuddin University will be deployed to West Sulawesi.

=== Criticism ===
There were reports of mass lootings in Majene Regency during the distribution of aid for the evacuees. People were advised to be careful while carrying goods and aid to impacted areas. Police stated that multiple incidents of lootings were recorded on camera and said that it will investigate those incidents. The Minister of Social Affairs Tri Rismaharini later clarified that reports of multiple lootings were declared as disinformation. Contrary to Rismaharini, the Indonesian National Board for Disaster Management (BNPB) confirmed that there were lootings in several areas in West Sulawesi. BNPB asked authorities to secure the routes that were used for logistics and aid to prevent further lootings. The Regional Police of West Sulawesi later announced that it will deploy personnel to secure routes from looters and also ensure that aid will be distributed directly to the evacuees. Multiple police officers were later deployed across Mamuju to shops and petrol stations to prevent lootings.

Evacuees and affected residents also reported that aid distribution was slow and logistics were not evenly distributed throughout affected areas. Several families were reportedly starving due to lack of aid, while others reported that not a single aid had been distributed through the community for at least a week. Complaints also rose from evacuees on inadequate sanitation and ineffective distribution as evacuees had to hand limited coupons to retrieve aid. Unclear bureaucracy also hampered relief efforts. There was discontent among evacuees, claiming that the regional government did not do anything for the affected residents.

== See also ==
- List of earthquakes in 2021
- 2018 Sulawesi earthquake and tsunami
- 1996 Sulawesi earthquake
- 1968 Sulawesi earthquake
- List of earthquakes in Indonesia
