= Health (disambiguation) =

Health is a level of functional and/or metabolic efficiency and may also refer to:

- Health care, the prevention, treatment, and management of illness
  - Health care compared, brief comparison chart of several systems
  - Health care industry, an industry providing health care services
- Health economics, a branch of economics concerned with health and health care
- Health law, law affecting the health care industry
- Public health, the overall health of a community
  - Environmental health, the branch of public health concerned with aspects of environment that may affect human health

== Human sciences ==
- Health education, the process of learning to behave in a manner conducive to good health
- Health effect, a change in health resulting from exposure to a source
- Health psychology, a branch of psychology concerned with understanding how biology, behavior, and social context influence health
- Health promotion, the process of enabling people to increase their health
- Health science, the applied science dealing with health
- Mental health, a level of cognitive or emotional wellbeing
- Reproductive health, the capability and freedom to reproduce

== Arts, entertainment, and media ==
- Health (TV series), a 1959 educational series that aired on ABC
- Health (band), an American noise rock band
  - Health (Health album), 2007 album by Health
- Health (film), a 1980 film directed by Robert Altman
- Health (game terminology), the value of health- or hit- points of a game character
- Health (Heavy Blinkers album)
- Health (journal), peer-reviewed healthcare journal
- Health (magazine), a magazine focused on women's health
- "Health" (Don't Hug Me I'm Scared), an episode of Don't Hug Me I'm Scared

== Software ==
- Health (Apple), a health-tracking platform by Apple

== Other uses ==
- Health, Arkansas, a community in the United States
- Fashion health, a form of legal brothel in Japan

== See also ==
- Department of Health
- Ministry of Health (disambiguation)
