= 1969 Sulawesi earthquake =

Earthquake off the coast of Indonesia

- Location within Sulawesi Location within Indonesia
- UTC time: 1969-02-23 00:36:58
- ISC event: 812497
- USGS-ANSS: ComCat
- Local date: February 23, 1969
- Local time: 08:56
- Magnitude: 7.1 M_{w}
- Depth: 15.0 km (9 mi)
- Epicenter: 3.201°S 118.904°E
- Fault: Majene Thrust
- Type: Thrust
- Max. intensity: MMI VIII (Severe)
- Tsunami: yes
- Casualties: 664

The western coast of West Sulawesi was struck by a major earthquake on 23 February 1969 at 00:36 UTC. It had a magnitude of 7.1 M_{w} and a maximum felt intensity of VIII on the Modified Mercalli intensity scale. It triggered a major tsunami that caused significant damage along the coast of the Makassar Strait. At least 64 people were killed, with possibly a further 600 deaths caused by the tsunami.

== Tectonic setting ==
Sulawesi lies within the complex zone of interaction between the Australian, Pacific, Philippine and Sunda plates in which many small microplates are developed. The main active structure onshore in the western part of Central Sulawesi is the left-lateral NNW-SSE Palu-Koro strike-slip fault that forms the boundary between the North Sula and Makassar blocks and was responsible for the destructive Palu earthquake in 2018. According to the interpretation of GPS data, the Makassar block is currently rotating anticlockwise, with its northwestern margin showing convergence with the Sunda block across the Makassar Strait. The main structure in that part of Sulawesi is the offshore, north–south trending, moderately east-dipping Makassar Thrust, also known as the Majene Thrust. The GPS data also support the presence of a seismically "locked" fault in the Makassar Strait. Seismic reflection data from the Makassar Strait support the presence of active thrusting west of the Makassar block. The Majene/Kalosi fold and thrust belt is exposed onshore between Majene and Mamuju. The northern part of the Makassar Strait is interpreted as a foreland basin, with its subsidence caused by the loading of this active thrust belt.

== Earthquake ==
The earthquake had an estimated magnitude of 7.4 M_{s}, later recalculated to be 7.1 M_{w}. It was caused by movement on the Majene Thrust, which was also responsible for the 2021 West Sulawesi earthquake 52 years later. Modelling of the earthquake by Pranantyo and others suggested rupture occurred across a rectangular fault plane measuring 40 km by 20 km. A maximum coseismic slip of 1.5 meters was estimated. The maximum Modified Mercalli intensity was VIII (Severe), causing serious damage at the coast.

=== Tsunami ===
The earthquake triggered a significant tsunami, with a maximum run-up of 4 meters at Peletoang and 1.5 meters at both Parosanga and Palipi. The same modelling by Pranantyo and others could not replicate the 4-meter tsunami run-up along Peletoang. Simulations of various scenarios for the earthquake and tsunami only generated a maximum tsunami height of 2.25 meters. It is possible that a submarine landslide triggered the large tsunami.

== Damage ==
The city of Majene was particularly badly affected, with the foundations of four out of five of tile brick buildings suffering serious effects. Wooden buildings escaped with only minor effects, but unreinforced masonry walls were badly damaged. A number of bridges were damaged beyond repair.

The tsunami caused local flooding, damaging banana plantations along the coast. Many wooden buildings were washed away by the waves. At Majene's harbour, the pier was seriously affected due to the effects of subsidence. Witnesses mention a "roaring sound" just before the tsunami.

At least 64 deaths were reported, with one news story also mentioning another 600 deaths due to the tsunami. A further 97 injuries were also reported.

== See also ==
- List of earthquakes in 1969
- List of earthquakes in Indonesia
- 2021 West Sulawesi earthquake
