= HFW =

HFW may refer to:

== Groups, organizations ==
- Health and Family Welfare (H&FW, HFW)
  - Department of Health and Family Welfare (Tamil Nadu), India (DOHFW, DoHFW, HFW)
  - Ministry of Health & Family Welfare (disambiguation) (MOHFW, MoHFW, HFW)
- Holman Fenwick Willan, an international law firm
- Hope for Wildlife (HFW, HfW), Greater Halifax, Nova Scotia, Canada; wildlife rescue centre and TV series
- Huddersfield Fine Worsteds, Huddersfield, Kirklees, West Yorkshire, Yorkshire, England, UK; a fine textiles merchant

== Other uses ==
- Hafnium–tungsten dating (Hf/W; Hf-W; Hf:W)
- Hohensaaten-Friedrichsthaler Wasserstraße (HFW; Hohen-Friedrich Canal), Havel–Oder–Wasserstraße, Germany; a navigable waterway
- Honey Frosted Wheaties, breakfast cereal
- Horizon Forbidden West, a video game released in February 2022
- Hugh Fearnley-Whittingstall, a British celebrity chef
- Hurricane force wind warning
