= Ministry of Public Health =

Ministry of Public Health may refer to:

- Ministry of Public Health (Afghanistan)
- Ministry of Public Health (Cameroon)
- Ministry of Public Health (Democratic Republic of the Congo)
- Ministry of Public Health (Guinea-Bissau)
- Ministry of Public Health (Maharashtra), India
- Ministry of Public Health (North Korea)
- Ministry of Public Health (Sindh), Pakistan
- Ministry of Public Health (Thailand)
  - Ministry of Public Health MRT station, Bangkok, Thailand
- Ministry of Public Health (Uruguay)
- Ministry of Public Health (Uzbekistan)

== See also ==
- Ministry of Health (disambiguation)
- List of health departments and ministries
