= Ministry of Health and Welfare =

Ministry of Health and Welfare can refer to:

- Ministry of Health, Labour and Welfare (Japan)
- Ministry of Health, Welfare and Sport (Netherlands)
- Ministry of Health and Welfare (South Korea)
- Ministry of Health and Welfare (Taiwan)

== See also ==
- Ministry of Health and Social Welfare (disambiguation)
- Ministry of Health & Family Welfare (disambiguation)
- Ministry of Health (disambiguation)
- Ministry of Welfare (disambiguation)
