= 衛生局 =

衛生局 (Pinyin: Wèishēngjú) is Chinese character which may refer to:

- Health Bureau (Macau)
- Department of Health in governmental agencies of Taiwan anywhere
  - Department of Health light rail station (衛生局站), a light rail station of Circular light rail, Kaohsiung, Taiwan

== See also ==
- Health Bureau (disambiguation)
- Ministry of Health (disambiguation)
