= Ministry of Social Affairs =

Disambiguation page

A ministry of social affairs or department of social affairs is the common name for a government department found in states where the government is divided into ministries or departments. While there is some variation in the responsibilities of such ministries, the common thread between them is their responsibility for assisting members of society who are in a vulnerable position for example due to age, dependence on government aid, or being the employee in an employee/employer relationship. Ministries of this type cover matters such as social work, social protection and assistance, pensions, welfare, health and social security, and workplace standards for employees

Examples of such ministries include:

- Ministry of Labour and Social Affairs (Albania)
- Ministry of Labor and Social Affairs (Armenia)
- Ministry of Social Affairs (Austria)
- Ministry of Social Welfare (Bangladesh)
- Ministry of Labour and Social Affairs (Czech Republic)
- Ministry of Social Affairs (Denmark)
- Ministry of Social Affairs (Estonia)
- Ministry of Labor and Social Affairs (Ethiopia)
- Ministry of Social Affairs and Health (Finland)
- Minister of Social Affairs (France)
- Ministry of Health, Labour and Social Affairs of Georgia
- Federal Ministry of Labour and Social Affairs (Germany, BMAS)
- Ministry of Labour and Social Affairs (Greece)
- Ministry of Social Affairs and Labor (Haiti)
- Ministry of Social Affairs (Iceland)
- Ministry of Social Affairs (Indonesia)
- Ministry of Labour and Social Affairs (Iran)
- Ministry of Labor, Social Affairs and Social Services (Israel)
- Ministry of Women, Youth, Sports and Social Affairs (Kiribati, MWYSSA)
- Ministry of Labour and Social Affairs (Puntland)
- Ministry of Social Affairs (Kuwait)
- Ministry of Social Affairs (Lebanon)
- Secretariat for Social Affairs and Culture (Macau)
- Ministry of Labour, Employment and Social Security (Myanmar)
- Ministry of Social Affairs and Employment (Netherlands, SZW)
- Ministry of Social Affairs (Norway)
- Ministry of Labour and Social Affairs (Russia)
- Ministry of Employment, Social and Family Affairs (Somaliland)
- Ministry of Social Affairs (Spain) – currently the Ministry of Social Rights and 2030 Agenda
- Ministry of Health and Social Affairs (Sweden)
- Ministry of Social Affairs and Labour (Syria)
- Ministry of Labour, Invalids and Social Affairs (Vietnam)

International organizations

- Social Affairs and Health Committee (African Union)
- Directorate-General for Employment, Social Affairs and Inclusion (European Commission, EMPL)
- United Nations Department of Economic and Social Affairs (UN DESA)

== See also ==
- Ministry of Health
- Ministry of Labor
- Ministry of Social Security
- Ministry of Social Welfare (disambiguation)
- Ministry of Welfare (disambiguation)
