= List of earthquakes in Ethiopia =

This is a list of notable earthquakes that have taken place in the history of Ethiopia.

== Earthquakes ==
Date	Region	Mag.	MMI	Deaths	Injuries	Total damage / notes	Source
2025-02-14	Awash	6.0 M_{s}	VIII	2	Several	Moderate	
2010-12-16	Jimma, Hosaena, Shenk'ola, Wenjela	5.1 M_{b}			Many	Many houses damaged	NGDC 1972
1973-04-01	Ethiopia, Djibouti	5.9 M_{s}				Moderate	NGDC 1972
1969-03-29	Sardo	6.2 M_{s}	IX	40	160	Many houses destroyed	NGDC 1972
1961-06-01	Karakore	6.5 M_{s}	IX	30	Many	Moderate	NGDC 1972
1921-08-14	Massawa subregion	5.9 M_{s}	VIII	Some		Severe	NGDC 1972
1875-11-02	Tigray region	6.2		Some		Severe	NGDC 1972
1845-02-12				Some			NGDC 1972
1842-12-08	Ankober		IX	Many		Severe	NGDC 1972
1733-11-29				Some			NGDC 1972
Note: The inclusion criteria for adding events are based on WikiProject Earthquakes' notability guideline that was developed for stand-alone articles. The principles described also apply to lists. In summary, only damaging, injurious, or deadly events should be recorded.
