= Ministry of Welfare =

Ministry of Welfare may refer to:

- Ministry of Welfare (Iceland)
- Ministry of Welfare and Social Security, Iran

== See also ==
- Ministry of Social Affairs
- Ministry of Social Security
- Ministry of Social Welfare (disambiguation)
- Ministry of Family Welfare (India)
- Ministry of Health and Welfare (disambiguation)
