= Department of Social Welfare =

Department of Social Welfare may refer to:

- Department of Social Protection in Ireland, named "Department of Social Welfare" 1947–1997
- Ministry of Social Development (New Zealand), named "Department of Social Welfare" 1972–1998
- Social Welfare Department, Hong Kong
- Department of Social Welfare and Development, Philippines

== See also ==
- Ministry of Social Welfare (disambiguation)
- Category:Social affairs ministries
