= 1969 Sardo earthquakes =

Earthquakes in Ethiopia

- Location within Ethiopia
- UTC time
- 1969-03-29 09:15:53
- 1969-03-29 11:04:50
- 1969-04-05 02:18:31
- ISC event
- 811663
- 811667
- 809572
- USGS-ANSS
- ComCat
- ComCat
- ComCat
- Local date
- March 29, 1969
- 30 March 1969
- 5 April 1969
- Local time
- 12:15:53
- 02:04:50
- 05:18:31
- Magnitude
- 6.2 M_{w}
- 6.1 M_{w}
- 6.1 M_{w}
- Depth: 10 km (6.2 mi)
- Epicenter: 11°52′30″N 41°12′29″E
- Areas affected: Ethiopia
- Max. intensity: MMI VIII (Severe) – MMI IX (Violent)
- Casualties: 20–40 fatalities, 160 injuries

The 1969 Sardo earthquakes, which occurred from 29 March 1969 to 5 April 1969 was an earthquake swarm of three events with magnitudes of 6.2 M_{w} and 6.1 M_{w} in the Afar Region, Ethiopia. All three tremors had estimated intensities of between IX (Violent) and VIII (Severe) respectively. It killed a total of about 20–40 people and further injuring 160 as well.

== Tectonic setting ==
The Afar Region is set in a tectonic boundary with three plates in a Y-shaped configuration. This makes Ethiopia home to one of the most seismic regions in all of Africa. It is also located in the Main Ethiopian Rift, part of the greater East African Rift which have been known to have been where frequent geological activity, one of the most common is the possible separation of East Africa from the mainland. The Main Ethiopian rift is a central valley some 84km wide and is extending ESE-WNW at a rate of about 2.5mm/yr. Ethiopia has experienced numerous earthquake similar to this such as in 1961 and 1847.

== Earthquakes ==
The first of the earthquake sequence had a magnitude of 6.2 and was the most destructive of the three causing the 20-40 deaths and 160 injuries as well as most of the damage. The second and third earthquakes both with magnitudes of 6.1 were fortunately less worse however still caused some damage and recorded with high intensities. Numerous surface faultings and displacement were also caused, the main event caused left-lateral displacements and throws northeast of 75 cm near Sardo. The April event also caused visible surface faultings near Sardo with 70 cm vertically and 50 cm horizontally.

== Damage ==
The village of Sardo (Serdo) suffered most of the impact due to it being the nearest to the epicenter. Poor infrastructure and framing was said to be blamed for the widespread severity of the damage. Some of the local huts in the area were made mostly of mud, which also resulted in the many deaths. The sequence triggered numerous rockslides blocking roads and transportation between the other parts of Ethiopia, as well as the outside in nearby Djibouti where moderate jolts were felt. Many of the residents who survived the event fled to the nearby village of Loggia.

== See also ==
- List of earthquakes in Ethiopia
- List of earthquakes in 1969
- East African Rift
- Great Rift Valley, Ethiopia
