= Federal Ministry of Health =

Federal Ministry of Health may refer to:

- Federal Ministry of Health (Germany)
- Federal Ministry of Health (Nigeria)

== See also ==
- Ministry of Health (disambiguation)
