= Ministry of Health & Family Welfare =

Ministry of Health & Family Welfare may refer to:

- Ministry of Health & Family Welfare (Tripura), India
- Ministry of Health & Family Welfare (West Bengal), India
- Ministry of Health and Family Welfare (Bangladesh)
- Ministry of Health and Family Welfare, India

== See also ==
- Ministry of Family Welfare and Demography (Serbia)
- Department of Health and Family Welfare (Tamil Nadu), India
- Department of Health, Family Welfare and Medical Education (Andhra Pradesh), India
- Department of Health
- Ministry of Health (disambiguation)
- Ministry of Health and Welfare (disambiguation)
- Ministry of Health and Social Welfare (disambiguation)
