= 1969 Yangjiang earthquake =

Earthquake in Guangdong, China

- Location within Guangdong
- UTC time: 1969-07-25 22:49:41
- ISC event: 807433
- USGS-ANSS: ComCat
- Local date: 26 July 1969
- Local time: 06:49:41
- Magnitude: 6.4 M_{w}
- Depth: 10 km (6.2 mi)
- Epicenter: 21.61°N 111.83°E
- Areas affected: China, Yangjiang
- Max. intensity: MMI IX (Violent)
- Casualties: 3,000 dead

The 1969 Yangjiang earthquake occurred on 26 July, at 6:49 am, Beijing local time (25 July 22:49 UTC). It had a magnitude of 6.4 on the moment magnitude scale and a maximum perceived intensity of IX (Violent) on the Mercalli intensity scale. It struck the city of Yangjiang, causing over 10,700 houses to collapse and severely damaging a further 36,000. The earthquake also caused landslides and sandblows observed along the coast and along some rivers in the area of Yangjiang. The earthquake was also felt in Hong Kong. There were an unconfirmed total of 3,000 deaths.

== Tectonic setting ==
Guangdong Province lies in a tectonically stable part of China, which has relatively low seismicity. The area forms part of the passive margin between the continental crust of China and the oceanic crust of the northern part of the South China Sea. Within the stable South China Block, there are three zones of higher earthquake activity, one of which is the Southeast China Coast seismic zone running through Guangdong and Fujian Provinces. This zone follows the South China Maritime Fold Belt, which was formed by a subduction event during the Late Jurassic to Early Cretaceous epochs. The area is currently in a compressive stress regime with the maximum horizontal stress orientated northwest–southeast. This results from a combination of the continuing collision between the Indian and Eurasian plates, and the subduction of the Philippine Sea plate.

== Earthquake ==
The earthquake occurred on a steeply-dipping fault striking nearly east–west. The focal mechanism shows mainly dextral (right lateral) strike-slip faulting. The magnitude and number of recorded foreshocks and aftershocks were unusually small, considering the size of the mainshock. This earthquake is the only damaging event in the epicentral area in historical records.

== Damage ==
The epicentral area lay mostly in Yangjiang County, affecting an area measuring 19 km by 10 km, elongated west to east. In the whole county, a total of 10,762 houses were completely destroyed, a further 35,965 were severely damaged and another 90,840 suffered some damage. In Xinyi about 1,200 houses suffered some damage and several were destroyed. The earthquake was also strongly felt in Fengkai, Huaiji, Xinzhong, Deqing, Zhaoqing, Yunan, Zengcheng, Gaohe and Panyu, although there was no serious damage in these areas. Minor damage was also reported in Hong Kong. A report of 3,000 casualties caused by this earthquake is described as "unconfirmed".

== See also ==
- List of earthquakes in 1969
- List of earthquakes in China
