= List of earthquakes in 1969 =

Earthquakes in 1969
Approximate epicenters of the earthquakes in 1969
- 4.0–5.9 magnitude
- 6.0–6.9 magnitude
- 7.0–7.9 magnitude
- 8.0+ magnitude
- Strongest: Soviet Union, Kuril Islands, Russia (Magnitude 8.2) August 11
- Deadliest: China, Guangdong Province (Magnitude 5.7) July 25 3,000 deaths
- Total fatalities: 4,024

Number by magnitude
- 9.0+: 0

This is a list of earthquakes in 1969. Only magnitude 6.0 or greater earthquakes appear on the list. Lower magnitude events are included if they have caused death, injury or damage. Events which occurred in remote areas will be excluded from the list as they wouldn't have generated significant media interest. All dates are listed according to UTC time. Maximum intensities are indicated on the Mercalli intensity scale and are sourced from United States Geological Survey (USGS) ShakeMap data. Activity generally was slightly below average with 14 events reaching magnitude 7 or greater. In August, the largest event of the year struck the Kuril Islands, Russia measuring 8.2. Other large events struck offshore Portugal and Indonesia. The Americas had no events above magnitude 7 which is an uncommon occurrence. Of the 4,000 deaths from earthquakes two events dominated. Southeastern China had an earthquake of magnitude 5.7 in July which contributed 4,024 of the total. Indonesia had the bulk of the rest of the death toll.

== Overall ==
=== By death toll ===
Rank	Death toll	Magnitude	Location	MMI	Depth (km)	Date
1	3,000	5.7	China, Guangdong Province	IX (Violent)	20.0	July 25
2	664	7.0	Indonesia, West Sulawesi	VIII (Severe)	15.0	February 23
3	150	6.6	Peru, Junin Region	XI (Extreme)	10.0	October 1
4	53	6.7	Turkey, Manisa Province	VIII (Severe)	10.0	March 28
5	50	5.5	Iran, North Khorasan Province	VIII (Severe)	10.0	January 3
6	40	6.2	Ethiopia Afar Region	IX (Violent)	10.0	March 29
7	25	7.8	Portugal, Azores-Gibraltar Transform Fault	VII (Very strong)	10.0	February 28
8	14	6.1	Yugoslavia, SR Bosnia and Herzegovina	VIII (Severe)	15.0	October 26
9	12	6.3	South Africa, Western Cape	IX (Violent)	15.0	September 29

- Note: At least 10 casualties

=== By magnitude ===
Rank	Magnitude	Death toll	Location	MMI	Depth (km)	Date
1	8.2	0	Soviet Union, Kuril Islands, Russia	IX (Violent)	30.0	August 11
2	7.8	25	Portugal, Azores-Gibraltar Transform Fault	VII (Very strong)	10.0	February 28
= 3	7.6	0	Indonesia, Talaud Islands	VII (Very strong)	60.0	January 30
= 3	7.6	0	Indonesia, off the west coast of northern Sumatra	VI (Strong)	25.0	November 21
4	7.4	0	Soviet Union, off the east coast of Kamchatka, Russia	X (Extreme)	35.0	November 22
= 5	7.2	0	United Kingdom, south of Fiji	( )	660.0	February 10
= 5	7.2	0	Indonesia, Banda Sea	IV (Light)	430.5	February 11
= 5	7.2	0	United Kingdom, east of Dominica	VI (Strong)	20.0	December 25
= 6	7.1	0	New Hebrides, Vanuatu	VII (Very strong)	112.9	January 19
= 6	7.1	0	Soviet Union, Kuril Islands, Russia	( )	27.5	August 14
= 7	7.0	0	United Kingdom, Santa Isabel Island, Solomon Islands	VIII (Severe)	60.0	January 5
= 7	7.0	0	Japan, off the north coast of Hokkaido	VI (Strong)	244.7	January 19
= 7	7.0	664	Indonesia, West Sulawesi	IV (Light)	15.0	February 23
= 7	7.0	0	Japan, off the east coast of Kyushu	VII (Very strong)	38.6	April 21

- Note: At least 7.0 magnitude

== Notable events ==
=== January ===
January
- Strongest: 7.6 M_{w} Indonesia
- Deadliest: 5.5 M_{w} Iran; 50 deaths
- Total fatalities: 50

Number by magnitude
- 8.0–8.9: 0
- 7.0–7.9: 4
- 6.0–6.9: 5
- 5.0–5.9: 1

Date	Country and location	M_{w}	Depth (km)	MMI	Notes	Casualties	
Date	Country and location	M_{w}	Depth (km)	MMI	Notes	Dead	Injured
3	Iran, North Khorasan Province	5.5	10.0	VIII	50 people were killed and some damage was caused.	50	
6	United Kingdom, Santa Cruz Islands, Solomon Islands	6.9	10.0	V			
14	Turkey, off the south coast	6.4	25.0	VI			
19	Japan, off the north coast of Hokkaido	7.0	244.7	VI			
19	New Hebrides, Vanuatu	7.1	112.9	VII			
24	United Kingdom, Fiji	6.7	593.5				
26	Soviet Union, off the east coast of Kamchatka, Russia	6.1	31.3	V			
27	United States, Yap State, Federated States of Micronesia	6.2	15.0				
30	Indonesia, Talaud Islands	7.6	60.0	VII			

=== February ===
February
- Strongest: 7.8 M_{w} Azores-Gibraltar Transform Fault
- Deadliest: 7.0 M_{w} Indonesia; 664 deaths
- Total fatalities: 693

Number by magnitude
- 8.0–8.9: 0
- 7.0–7.9: 4
- 6.0–6.9: 4

Date	Country and location	M_{w}	Depth (km)	MMI	Notes	Casualties	
Date	Country and location	M_{w}	Depth (km)	MMI	Notes	Dead	Injured
3	Indonesia, Talaud Islands	6.8	35.0	VI	Aftershock.		
4	Indonesia, Gulf of Tomini, Sulawesi	6.1	45.0	V			
4	Peru, off the north coast	6.2	35.0	IV			
10	United Kingdom, south of Fiji	7.2	660.0				
11	China, Xinjiang Province	6.1	13.3	VIII	4 people were killed and at least 1 person was injured. Many homes were destroyed.	4	1+
11	Indonesia, Banda Sea	7.2	430.5	IV			
23	Indonesia, West Sulawesi	7.0	15.0	VIII	64 people were killed in the 1969 Sulawesi earthquake. A further 600 died in a tsunami which flooded the area. 97 people were injured. 1,287 homes were destroyed.	664	97
28	Azores-Gibraltar Transform Fault	7.8	10.0	VII	The 1969 Portugal earthquake struck far offshore in the Atlantic Ocean but caused some damage on land. 25 people were killed and another 80 were injured. Some damage was caused.	25	80

=== March ===
March
- Strongest: 6.7 M_{w} 2 events
- Deadliest: 6.7 M_{w} Turkey; 53 deaths
- Total fatalities: 95

Number by magnitude
- 8.0–8.9: 0
- 7.0–7.9: 0
- 6.0–6.9: 12
- 5.0–5.9: 1

Date	Country and location	M_{w}	Depth (km)	MMI	Notes	Casualties	
Date	Country and location	M_{w}	Depth (km)	MMI	Notes	Dead	Injured
5	Afghanistan, Badakhshan Province	6.2	205.6	IV			
9	Indonesia, Papua (province)	6.3	20.0	VII			
19	Japan, Ryukyu Islands	6.5	168.5				
20	Philippines, east of Mindanao	6.1	20.0				
21	Mexico, northern Gulf of California	6.0	10.0	VI			
23	Turkey, Manisa Province	5.9	15.0	VIII	Foreshock to event on March 28. Extensive damage was caused.		
25	Turkey, Kütahya Province	6.1	15.0	VII	Foreshock to event on March 28.		
27	Indonesia, Talaud Islands	6.6	50.0	V	Aftershock of January 30 event.		
28	Turkey, Manisa Province	6.7	10.0	VIII	53 people were killed and extensive damage was caused by the 1969 Alaşehir earthquake.	53	
29	Ethiopia, Afar Region	6.2	10.0	rowspan="2"| 40 people died and a further 160 were injured by the 1969 Sardo earthquakes. Many homes were destroyed. Damage costs were $320,000 (1969 rate). Doublet earthquake.	40	160	
29	Ethiopia, Afar Region	6.1	10.0	VIII			
31	Egypt, Gulf of Suez	6.6	10.0	VIII	2 people were killed and 16 were injured in the 1969 Sharm El Sheikh earthquake. 107 homes were destroyed.	2	16
31	Japan, Sea of Japan	6.7	398.1				

=== April ===
April
- Strongest: 7.0 M_{w} Japan
- Total fatalities: 0

Number by magnitude
- 8.0–8.9: 0
- 7.0–7.9: 1
- 6.0–6.9: 6

Date	Country and location	M_{w}	Depth (km)	MMI	Notes	Casualties	
Date	Country and location	M_{w}	Depth (km)	MMI	Notes	Dead	Injured
5	Ethiopia, Afar Region	6.1	15.0	VIII			
16	Australia, south of New Ireland (island), Papua and New Guinea	6.5	25.0				
16	New Hebrides, Vanuatu	6.2	100.0	rowspan="2"| Doublet earthquake. Both events 23 seconds apart.			
16	New Hebrides, Vanuatu	6.0	35.0				
21	Japan, off the east coast of Kyushu	7.0	38.6	VII			
26	Chile, Coquimbo Region	6.0	35.0	rowspan="2"| Doublet earthquake. Two events around 4 minutes apart.			
26	Chile, Coquimbo Region	6.2	35.0	VII			

=== May ===
May
- Strongest: 6.9 M_{w} United States
- Total fatalities: 0

Number by magnitude
- 8.0–8.9: 0
- 7.0–7.9: 0
- 6.0–6.9: 5

Date	Country and location	M_{w}	Depth (km)	MMI	Notes	Casualties	
Date	Country and location	M_{w}	Depth (km)	MMI	Notes	Dead	Injured
4	New Hebrides, Vanuatu	6.0	10.0	V			
14	United States, Andreanof Islands, Alaska	6.9	28.3	V			
15	France, northeast of Guadeloupe	6.0	34.8				
21	Philippines, east of Samar	6.0	30.0	rowspan="2"| Doublet earthquake.			
26	Philippines, east of Samar	6.0	30.0	V			

=== June ===
June
- Strongest: 6.5 M_{w} United States
- Total fatalities: 0

Number by magnitude
- 8.0–8.9: 0
- 7.0–7.9: 0
- 6.0–6.9: 2

Date	Country and location	M_{w}	Depth (km)	MMI	Notes	Casualties	
Date	Country and location	M_{w}	Depth (km)	MMI	Notes	Dead	Injured
12	Greece, south of Crete	6.1	22.4				
17	United States, Northern Mariana Islands	6.5	202.6				

=== July ===
July
- Strongest: 6.9 M_{w} China
- Deadliest: 5.7 M_{w} China; 3,000 deaths
- Total fatalities: 3,000

Number by magnitude
- 8.0–8.9: 0
- 7.0–7.9: 0
- 6.0–6.9: 3
- 5.0–5.9: 1

Date	Country and location	M_{w}	Depth (km)	MMI	Notes	Casualties	
Date	Country and location	M_{w}	Depth (km)	MMI	Notes	Dead	Injured
18	China, Bohai Sea	6.9	10.0	VI	Major damage was caused by the 1969 Bohai earthquake. Many homes were destroyed.		
19	Peru, off the south coast	6.4	56.7	VI			
24	Peru, Junin Region	6.1	10.0	XI	Major damage was caused.		
25	China, Guangdong Province	5.7	20.0	IX	Deadliest event of 1969. The 1969 Yangjiang earthquake caused major destruction in the area despite being a relatively moderate magnitude. 3,000 people were killed. 10,762 homes were destroyed.	3,000	

=== August ===
August
- Strongest: 8.2 M_{w} Soviet Union, Russia
- Total fatalities: 0

Number by magnitude
- 8.0–8.9: 1
- 7.0–7.9: 1
- 6.0–6.9: 12

Date	Country and location	M_{w}	Depth (km)	MMI	Notes	Casualties	
Date	Country and location	M_{w}	Depth (km)	MMI	Notes	Dead	Injured
5	Indonesia, Molucca Sea	6.9	26.9	VII			
8	Indonesia, Banda Sea	6.6	176.1				
11	Italy, Umbria	4.7	33.0	VII	4 people were injured and some damage was reported.		4
11	Soviet Union, Kuril Islands, Russia	6.2	25.0		Foreshock.		
11	Soviet Union, Kuril Islands, Russia	6.2	25.0		Foreshock. This came a minute after the previous event.		
11	Soviet Union, Kuril Islands, Russia	8.2	25.0		Largest event of 1969. This came just seconds after the last event. Some damage was caused. Many aftershocks followed. To prevent cluttering only events above 6.5 will be included in the article.		
11	Indonesia, Molucca Sea	6.2	35.0	VI	Aftershock of August 5 event.		
12	Soviet Union, Kuril Islands, Russia	6.8	30.0		Aftershock.		
12	Soviet Union, Kuril Islands, Russia	6.8	29.3		Aftershock.		
12	Soviet Union, Kuril Islands, Russia	6.8	19.3		Aftershock.		
14	Soviet Union, Kuril Islands, Russia	7.1	27.5	V	Aftershock.		
17	Mexico, Gulf of California	6.5	15.0	rowspan="2"| Doublet earthquake. Events only 2 minutes apart.			
17	Mexico, Gulf of California	6.7	15.0	VI			
18	Mexico, Gulf of California	6.0	20.0		Aftershock.		
19	Soviet Union, Kuril Islands, Russia	6.6	26.7		Aftershock.		

=== September ===
September
- Strongest: 6.7 M_{w} United States
- Deadliest: 6.3 M_{w} South Africa; 12 deaths
- Total fatalities: 12

Number by magnitude
- 8.0–8.9: 0
- 7.0–7.9: 0
- 6.0–6.9: 7
- 5.0–5.9: 1

Date	Country and location	M_{w}	Depth (km)	MMI	Notes	Casualties	
Date	Country and location	M_{w}	Depth (km)	MMI	Notes	Dead	Injured
6	United Kingdom, Solomon Islands	6.2	25.0	rowspan="2"| Doublet earthquake.			
6	United Kingdom, Solomon Islands	6.0	25.0	VI			
9	Japan, Gifu Prefecture, Honshu	6.3	10.0	VII			
12	United States, Andreanof Islands, Alaska	6.7	34.2				
14	China, Xinjiang Province	5.8	30.0	VII	10 homes were destroyed.		
17	Japan, off the southeast coast of Kyushu	6.0	35.0	IV			
22	Indonesia, off the north coast of Simeulue	6.0	30.0	VI			
29	South Africa, south-western Cape Province (present-day Western Cape)	6.3	15.0	IX	12 people were killed in the 1969 Tulbagh earthquake. Extensive property damage was caused with costs being $24 million (1969 rate).	12	

=== October ===
October
- Strongest: 6.6 M_{w} 2 events
- Deadliest: 6.6 M_{w} Peru; 150 deaths
- Total fatalities: 174

Number by magnitude
- 8.0–8.9: 0
- 7.0–7.9: 0
- 6.0–6.9: 6

Date	Country and location	M_{w}	Depth (km)	MMI	Notes	Casualties	
Date	Country and location	M_{w}	Depth (km)	MMI	Notes	Dead	Injured
1	Peru, Junin Region	6.6	10.0	XI	150 people were killed. Property damage costs were $5 million (1969 rate).	150	
1	Peru, Junin Region	6.0	10.0	VII	Aftershock.		
2	United States, northern California	4.8	10.0	VIII	The 1969 Santa Rosa earthquakes caused 1 death and property damage. Costs were $8 million (1969 rate).	1	
17	Burma, Sagaing Region	6.3	135.0	VI			
26	Yugoslavia, Bosnia and Herzegovina	6.1	15.0	rowspan="2"| In the 1969 Banja Luka earthquake 23 people were killed in total. 14 in the first event and 9 in the second. Extensive property damage was caused. Costs were $50 million (1969 rate). Doublet earthquake.	14		
27	Yugoslavia, Bosnia and Herzegovina	6.1	15.0	IX	9		
31	United States, Andreanof Islands, Alaska	6.6	30.0	IV			

=== November ===
November
- Strongest: 7.6 M_{w} Indonesia
- Total fatalities: 0

Number by magnitude
- 8.0–8.9: 0
- 7.0–7.9: 2
- 6.0–6.9: 4

Date	Country and location	M_{w}	Depth (km)	MMI	Notes	Casualties	
Date	Country and location	M_{w}	Depth (km)	MMI	Notes	Dead	Injured
1	Mexico, Gulf of California	6.6	10.0				
5	United States, off the coast of central California	6.0	10.0	V			
7	Iran, Sistan and Baluchistan Province	6.6	75.0	VI			
21	Indonesia, off the west coast of northern Sumatra	7.6	25.0	VI			
22	Soviet Union, off the east coast of Kamchatka, Russia	7.4	35.0	X	Some damage was caused.		
24	Soviet Union, Gorno-Badakhshan Autonomous Region, Tajikistan	6.1	115.1	IV			
26	New Hebrides, Vanuatu	6.0	25.0	V			

=== December ===
December
- Strongest: 7.2 M_{w} United Kingdom, Dominica
- Total fatalities: 0

Number by magnitude
- 8.0–8.9: 0
- 7.0–7.9: 1
- 6.0–6.9: 3

Date	Country and location	M_{w}	Depth (km)	MMI	Notes	Casualties	
Date	Country and location	M_{w}	Depth (km)	MMI	Notes	Dead	Injured
10	New Hebrides, Espiritu Santo, Vanuatu	6.2	20.0	VI			
18	Soviet Union, off the south coast of Sakhalin, Russia	6.3	345.0	III			
25	United Kingdom, east of Dominica	7.2	20.0	VI	Some damage was caused.		
31	Japan, Ryukyu Islands	6.3	25.0	V			
