= Ministry of Health and Social Welfare =

Ministry of Health and Social Welfare can mean:

- Ministry of Health and Social Welfare (Tanzania)
- Ministry of Health and Social Welfare (Liberia)
- Ministry of Health and Social Welfare (Albania)

== See also ==
- Ministry of Health and Welfare (disambiguation)
- Ministry of Social Welfare (disambiguation)
- Ministry of Health (disambiguation)
