= 1969 Bohai earthquake =

Earthquake in China

- Location within China
- UTC time: 1969-07-18 05:24:47
- ISC event: 807162
- USGS-ANSS: ComCat
- Local date: July 18, 1969
- Local time: 13:24:47
- Magnitude: M_{s} 7.4
- Depth: 35 km (22 mi)
- Epicenter: 38.2°N 119.4°E
- Max. intensity: MMI IX (Violent)
- Casualties: 10 dead, 353 injured

The 1969 Bohai earthquake occurred on July 18, 1969, at 13:24 local time. The epicenter was located in the Bohai Sea, off the coast of Shandong Province, China. The magnitude of this earthquake is M_{s} 7.4. Areas of maximal intensity were mainly distributed around the estuary of the Yellow River. Ground cracks and sand boils were reported. The earthquake could be felt in Liaoning, Hebei, Beijing, Tianjin, Shanxi, Shandong, and Jiangsu. Ten people were reported dead.

== Earthquake ==
This earthquake caused ground surface subsidences of about 15.1–15.8 cm (5.9–6.2 in) in the Yellow River Delta region. The mechanism of this earthquake was of dextral strike-slip faulting. Although it was located near the Tancheng-Lujiang fault zone (郯庐断裂带), some researchers think that this earthquake was dominated by the seaward extending part of the Huanghekou-Liaocheng seismotectonic zone (黄河口-聊城地震构造带).

== Damage ==
At least 10 people died and 353 were injured. Many livestock were also killed. An estimated 15,190 homes were destroyed and a further 24,810 damaged. One reservoir and a bridge, together with a dike along the Yellow River were damaged. A loss of RMB 50 million was estimated. A maximum intensity of IX was estimated around the epicenter area. The area where intensity VI was felt covered 29,736 km^{2} (11,481 sq mi).

In Xinan, Kenli County, 22 brick homes were destroyed and over 300 left in ruins. A 100 m (330 ft)-long brickwalled stable collapsed. On Gudao Island, a fissure measuring 1 km (0.62 mi) and 30–40 cm (12–16 in) wide occurred, and the island's northern part subsided by 30 cm (12 in). Ground subsidence and liquefaction occurred. At Xiazhen, many adobe and thatched homes were damaged; a third were destroyed and some were razed. In Shuanghe, 118 of the 1,500 homes were destroyed or collapsed while 200 more were damaged. A dike along the Yellow River was heavily fissured and a section slumped by 1–2 m (3 ft 3 in – 6 ft 7 in).

In Lijin County, a fissure cracked the Yellow River dike at Luhe; a 200 m (660 ft) segment subsided by 5–15 cm (2.0–5.9 in). Seventeen homes in Bijiazui collapsed, 125 destroyed, and 27 damaged. Only three of the 16 homes in Guanghe were intact while at Weishantou, 11 of its 30 homes were flattened. The earthquake also destroyed or damaged homes and created ground fissures in Changyi, Pingdu, Binxian, Laixi, Changdao and Shouguang counties.

== Tsunami ==
A tsunami of 1–2 m (3 ft 3 in – 6 ft 7 in) was measured above the usual tide level, although no further information was given as to whether it occurred during a low or high tide, and no tide level measurements were made. The tsunami also caused some losses in coastal Tangshan, Hebei, but its details are not available. Agricultural land and communities were flooded near Changli.

== See also ==
- List of earthquakes in 1969
- List of earthquakes in China
