= 1969 Portugal earthquake =

Earthquake in Portugal and Morocco

- Location within Morocco Location within Portugal
- UTC time: 1969-02-28 02:40:32
- ISC event: 812637
- USGS-ANSS: ComCat
- Local date: 28 February 1969
- Local time: 02:40:32
- Magnitude: 7.8 M_{w}
- Depth: 22.0 km (13.7 mi)
- Epicenter: 36.017°N 10.950°W
- Areas affected: Portugal, Morocco
- Max. intensity: MMI VII (Very strong)
- Tsunami: 1.14 m (3 ft 9 in); 3 runups
- Aftershocks: 6.3 M_{w} Feb 28 at 04:25:35 UTC
- Casualties: 13 killed 80 injured

The 1969 Portugal earthquake struck western Portugal and Morocco on 28 February at 02:40 UTC. Originating west of the Strait of Gibraltar, the earthquake registered a magnitude of 7.8 and the maximum felt intensity was VII (Very strong) on the Mercalli intensity scale. In total, 13 people died and 80 sustained minor injuries. It was the largest earthquake to hit Portugal since the 1755 Lisbon earthquake.

== Tectonic setting ==
The epicenter of the earthquake lies within a diffuse zone of seismicity known as the Azores–Gibraltar seismic belt, which marks the boundary between the African plate and the Eurasian plate. The deformation at this plate boundary is transpressional in style, with dextral (right lateral) strike-slip accompanied by slow convergence (4 mm/yr). Linear bathymetric features within this zone, such as the SW–NE trending Gorringe Bank, are thought to be a result of reverse faulting. Investigations using multibeam swathe bathymetry have revealed additional SW–NE trending reverse faults and fold axes and a set of WNW–ESE trending lineaments, interpreted as strike-slip faults. The earthquake was located within the Horseshoe Abyssal Plain, where active reverse faulting has been imaged on seismic reflection data.

== Damage and casualties ==
At magnitude 7.8, the earthquake was considered very powerful. The resulting damage killed 13 people (11 in Morocco and 2 in Portugal). Damage to local buildings was "moderate", according to the United States Geological Survey. Overall, structures were prepared for the earthquake and responded well, sustaining slight, if any, damage.

== Characteristics ==
The earthquake is interpreted to have resulted from movement on a southeast-dipping reverse fault. Analysis of seismigrams of the earthquake revealed two subevents comprised the rupture process. The first subevent, a pure thrust-faulting mechanism, occurred during the first 15 seconds of the rupture. Twenty seconds after the rupture onset, a larger subevent occurred with a strike-slip mechanism at shallower depths, reaching the seafloor.

== See also ==
- List of earthquakes in 1969
- List of earthquakes in Portugal
- List of earthquakes in Morocco
- 1761 Portugal earthquake
