= 1969 Alaşehir earthquake =

Earthquake in Turkey

- Location within Turkey
- UTC time: 1969-03-28 01:48:32
- ISC event: 811616
- USGS-ANSS: ComCat
- Local date: March 28, 1969
- Local time: 03:48:32
- Magnitude: M_{w} 6.8
- Depth: 10 km (6.2 mi)
- Epicenter: 38.515°N 28.546°E
- Areas affected: Turkey
- Max. intensity: MSK-64 VIII (Damaging)
- Casualties: 53 dead

The 1969 Alaşehir earthquake occurred on March 28 at 03:48 local time near the city of Alaşehir in Turkey's Manisa Province. The M_{w} 6.8 earthquake struck at 10 km (6.2 mi) depth. It had a MSK 64 intensity of VIII (Destructive). At least 53 people were killed in the earthquake.

== Tectonic setting ==
The Alaşehir region is dominated by extensional faulting in the young sedimentary layers. Extension accommodated by normal faults cause uplift in the land, forming graben features. Earthquakes in this region have pure normal dip-slip mechanism with no strike-slip components. These earthquakes occur along faults that are parallel to the grabens. Faults in the area have a dip angle of 30–60° and extend down to 12 km (7.5 mi) beneath the surface.

== Earthquake ==
The earthquake occurred in the Alaşehir Valley where normal faulting was the mechanism; occurring along a northwest–southeast striking, northeast dipping plane. Surface ruptures developed in the valley where the earthquake occurred. At least six surface ruptures were traced uninterrupted for long distances. The longest rupture was measured more than 12 km (7.5 mi) long. The total length of measured surface rupture was 30–36 km (19–22 mi); extending from Dereköy, through Alaşehir and terminating at Doğuşlar. An average surface offset of 20 cm (7.9 in) was measured. However the measurement was recorded a week after the event hence aseismic creep may have occurred and contaminated actual coseismic offset measurements.

An intense aftershock sequence followed the mainshock. One of these aftershocks was recorded mb 4.6. Felt report of aftershocks by locals have been debunked as separate seismic activity in Demirci, where another severe earthquake occurred on March 23.

== Impact ==
At least 53 people died. Land failure and landslides on the slopes of the valleys contributed to heavy damage. Many small villages suffered great destruction. At least 3,072 buildings were damaged or destroyed. The Demirköprü Dam however, was undamaged.

== See also ==
- List of earthquakes in 1969
- List of earthquakes in Turkey
