= Health (TV series) =

- Genre: Educational
- Country of origin: Australia
- Original language: English
- No. of episodes: 4

Production
- Running time: 20 minutes

Original release
- Network: ABC Television
- Release: 17 March – 7 April 1959

Health is an Australian television series aired in 1959 on ABC Television. It was an educational series intended to be viewed in schools. Four episodes were produced. It aired in a 20-minute time-slot.

== Episodes ==
No.	Title	Original release date
1	"Water Safety"	17 March 1959
2	"Resuscitation"	24 March 1959
3	"You're Growing Up"	31 March 1959
4	"You're Growing Up"	7 April 1959
