= Ministry of social welfare =

Ministry of Social Welfare may refer to:

- Ministry of Social Welfare (Argentina)
- Ministry of Social Welfare (Bangladesh)
- Ministry of Social Welfare (Denmark)
- Ministry of Social Welfare (Malaysia)
- Ministry of Social Welfare and Rehabilitation, Nigeria
- Ministry of Social Welfare, Relief and Resettlement, Myanmar
- Ministry of Social Welfare and Youth (Albania)

== See also ==
- Department of Social Welfare (disambiguation)
- Ministry of Health and Social Welfare (disambiguation)
- Ministry of Welfare (disambiguation)
