= Ministry of Public Health (Cameroon) =

Cameroon's attainment of independence on January 1, 1960 marked a significant milestone in the development and organization of the country's health sector. However, efforts to establish a structured healthcare framework had already began 1957, with the appointment of Adama Hamma as Minister of Health under the government of André-Marie Mbida. Following the appointment of Ahmadou Babatoura Ahidjo as prime minister on February 18, 1958, the ministry was later renamed Ministry of Health and Population. The ministry was subsequently overseen by the minister of state Aroun Njayo who served in the capacity till 1960.

Following independence in 1960, Cameroon assumed full responsibility of its sovereign functions, including the development of its healthcare system. The government expanded healthcare infrastructure by creating new facilities and expanding existing ones such as Yaoundé Central Hospital and Laquintinei Hospital. A major achievement was reached in 1969, with the establishment of the University Center for Health Sciences (CUSS), which was tasked with the responsibility of training physicians that will assume responsibilities in curative and preventive medicine. Following the January 1993 university's reform, CUSS was transformed to faculty of Medicine and Biomedical sciences. The decentralization of the medical education lead to the creation of faculties of medicine in both the University of Douala and University of Buea.

== Organization ==
The Ministry of Health is placed under the authority of the Minister of Health, assisted by a private secretary, three technical advisors, an inspector general, a central administration and decentralized services, public health training, specialized bodies and technical committees.

== Missions and vision ==
The ministry of health is tasked with the responsibility of developing and executing public health policies. The ministry is also responsible for managing healthcare facilities across the country, ensure technical oversight across private health facilities and development of control measures against pandemic and outbreaks.

== List of ministers ==
Since 1960, 16 ministers have headed the Cameroonian ministry of Health. In a chronological order they are:

- Pierre Kamdem Minyin (1960–1961)
- Simon PierreTsoungui (1961–1965)
- Jeane Claude Happi (1965–1970)
- Bernard Folon (1970–1971)
- Paul Fokam Kamga (1971–1980)
- Athanase Eteme Oloa (1980–1983)
- Hubert Nkoulou (1983–1984)
- Victor Anomah Ngu (1984–1988)
- Joseph Mbede (1988–1994)
- Joseph Owona (1994_1996)
- Titus Edzoa (1996–1997)
- Charles Etoundi (1997)
- Gottlieb Lobe Monekosso (1997–2000)
- Laurent Esso (2000–2001)
- Urwain Olanguena Awono (2001–2007)
- Andre Mama Fouda

Several deputy ministers, vice ministers and secretary of state have also supported the ministries in different capacities, notable amongst them was Augustin Njom Nju (1961–1962), Simon Njami Nwadi (1992–1996), Alim Hayatou who served as secretary of state since 1996.
