= Health Bureau =

Health Bureau can refer to:

- Health Bureau (Macau)
- Health Bureau (Hong Kong)
