= Health, Arkansas =

Unincorporated community in Arkansas, US

Coordinates: 35°47′21″N 93°56′35″W

Health is an unincorporated community in Madison County, Arkansas, United States. The community is located on a high ridge of the Boston Mountains in the southwestern corner of Madison County at an elevation of 2,411 feet (735 m).

The community of Brannon is approximately two miles to the north and Temple Hill is about two miles to the west in adjacent Washington County.

== History ==
A post office called Health was established in 1895, and remained in operation until 1947. The community was so named on account of the healthy conditions at the elevated town site.
