= Majene =

- Town
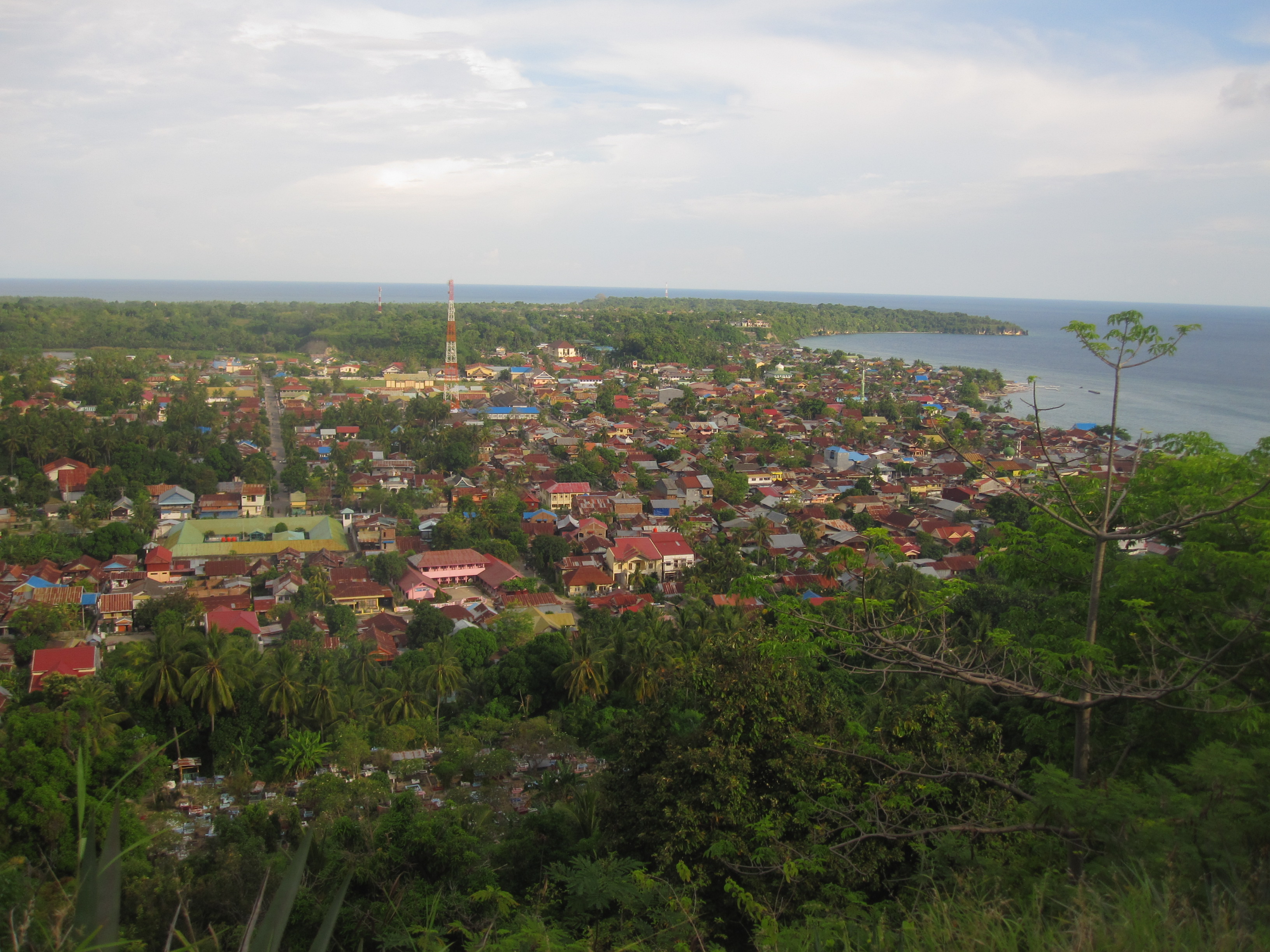
- Majene seen from above

- Location in Sulawesi and Indonesia Majene (Indonesia)
- Country: Indonesia
- Province: West Sulawesi
- Regency: Majene Regency
- Kecamatan: Banggae; East Banggae

Area
  - Total: 55.19 km^{2} (21.31 sq mi)

Population
  - Total: 82,563
  - Density: 1,496/km^{2} (3,875/sq mi)
- Time zone: UTC+8 (WITA)

Majene is the administrative capital of Majene Regency and it is located in the far south of the Indonesian province of West Sulawesi.

== People ==
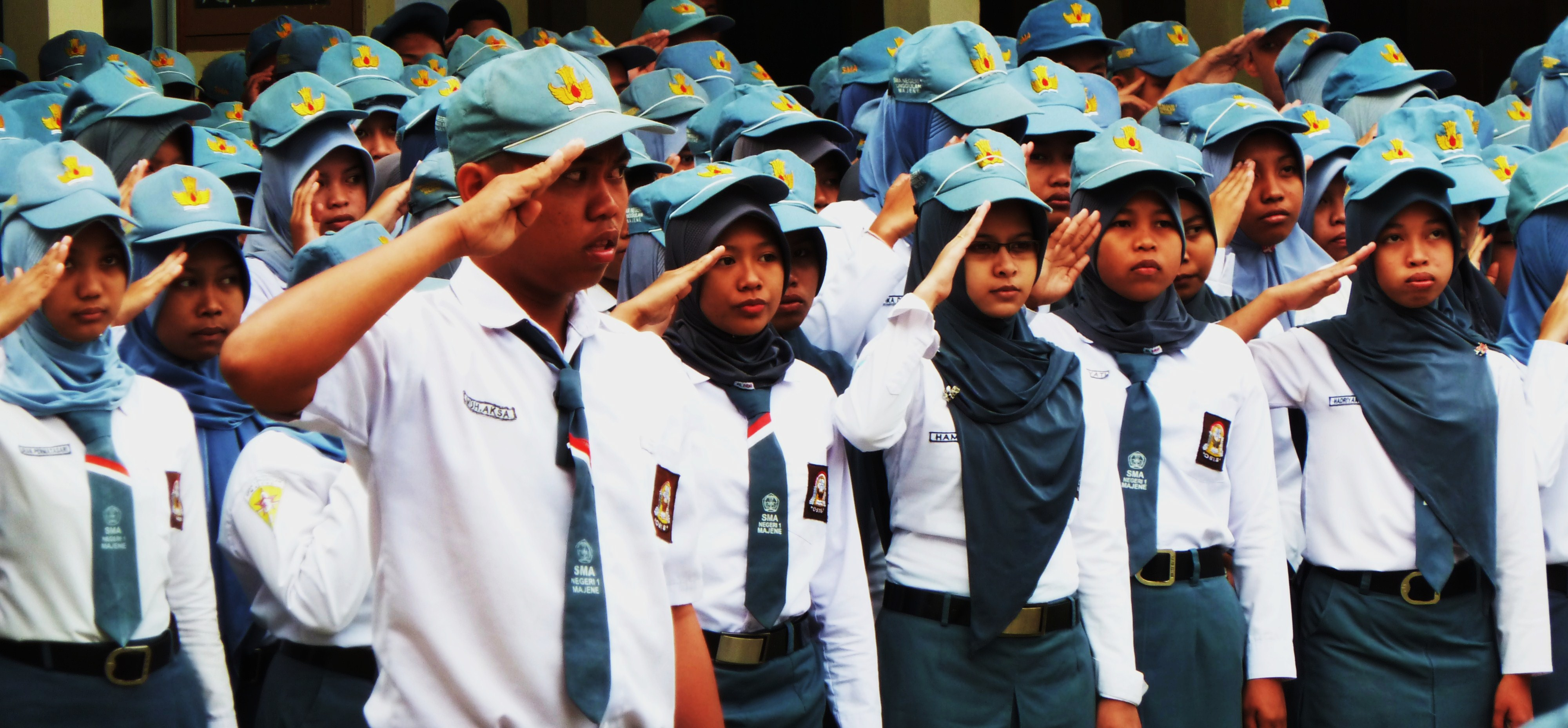
Flag ceremony at a Majene senior high school

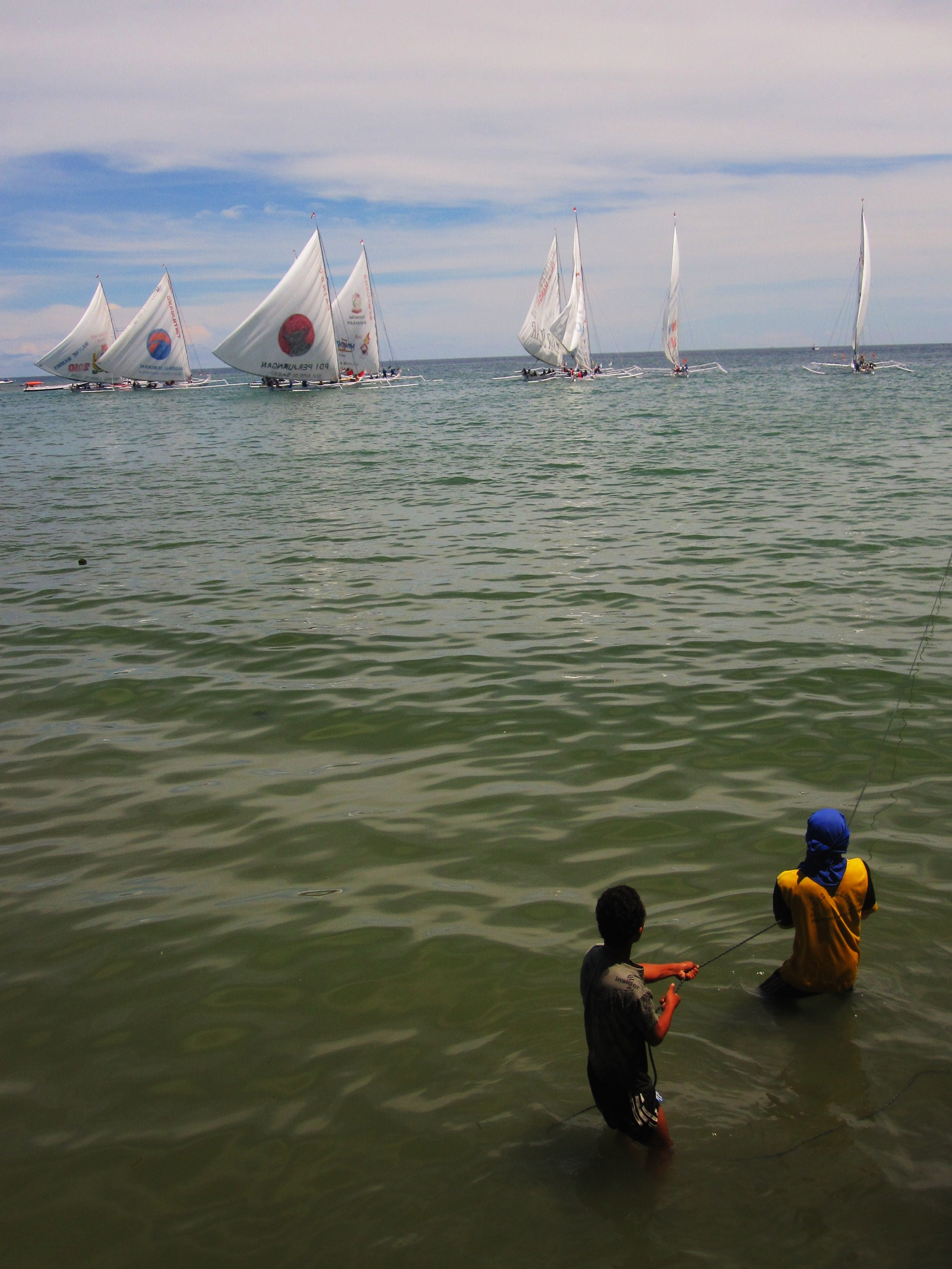
Sandeq boats in Majene

The population at the 2020 census was 73,883 people, 52% of which were female and 48% of which were male; the official estimate as at mid 2025 was 82,563. The town is divided into two districts (kecamatan): Banggae and Banggae Timur. In 2025, the average population density for Banggae was 1,867.8 people per square kilometre while the density for East Banggae was 1,154.0 people per square kilometre. In 2023, 37.3% of the population consisted of individuals under the age of 20, while 70.2% of the population consisted of individuals under the age of 40. (Source: Majene Census Bureau)

The largest population group are those of Mandar ethnic origins. The next largest ethnic group represented in the town are the Buginese. The remaining ethnic groups living in the city are mixed and include Javanese, Makassarese, Madurese, and ethnic Chinese, and people from Mamasa, Enrekang, Minang and Tana Toraja. Each of these groups has its own corresponding languages.

== Weather ==
Daily temperatures average around 27.5 °C (81.5 °F) with a mean humidity factor of 78.3%. The number of rain days and rainfalls from 2009 are tabulated below:

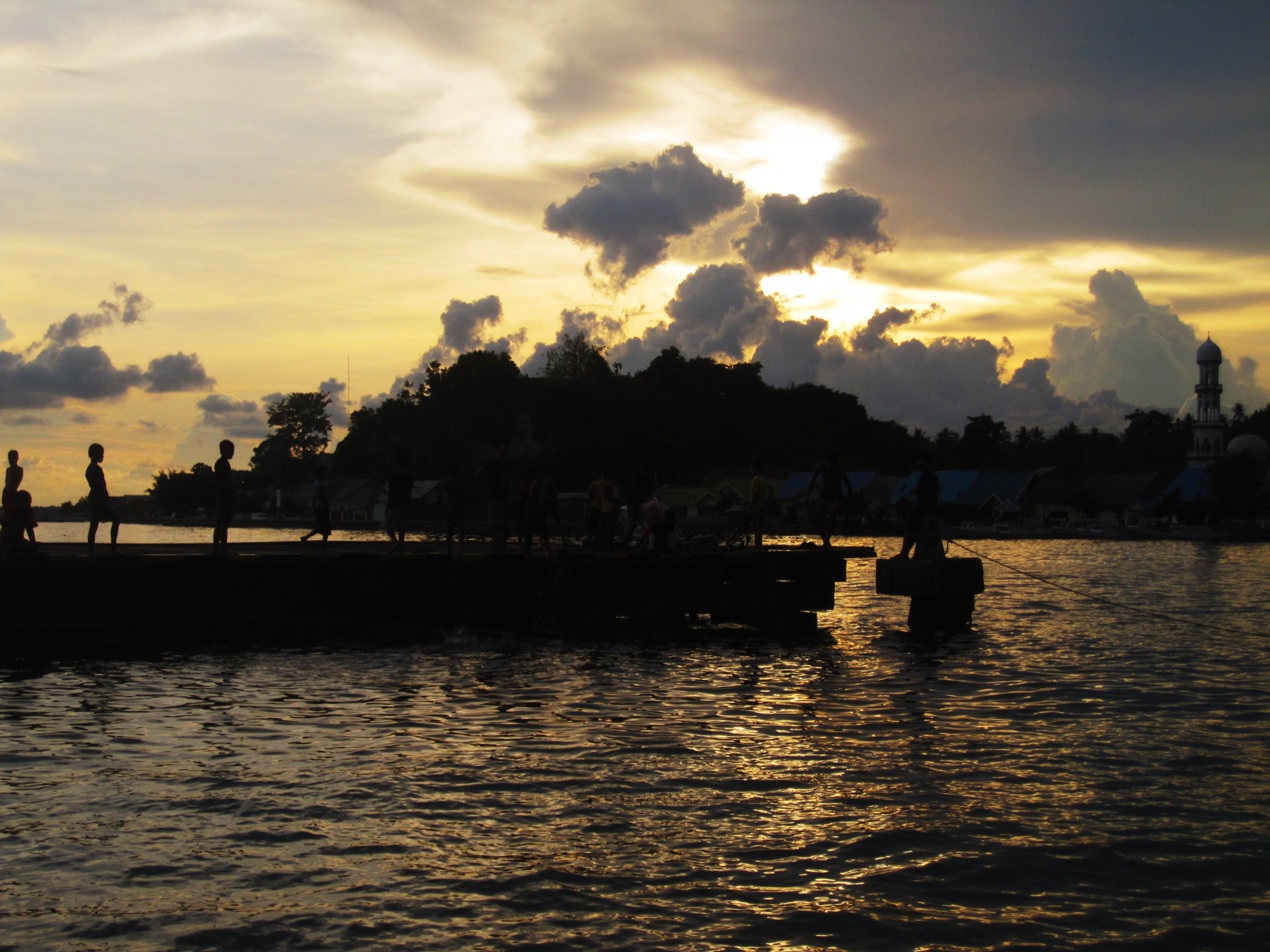
Clouds over the harbour

	Number of Rainy days	Number of Rainfalls
January	19	597.8
February	22	163.2
March	11	139.6
April	17	148.0
May	20	122.0
June	7	20.6
July	44	59.5
August	8	32.6
September	5	6.2
October	13	116.5
November	15	152.5
December	14	154.4

(Source: Meteorology Station from Majene Regency)

== Town layout ==
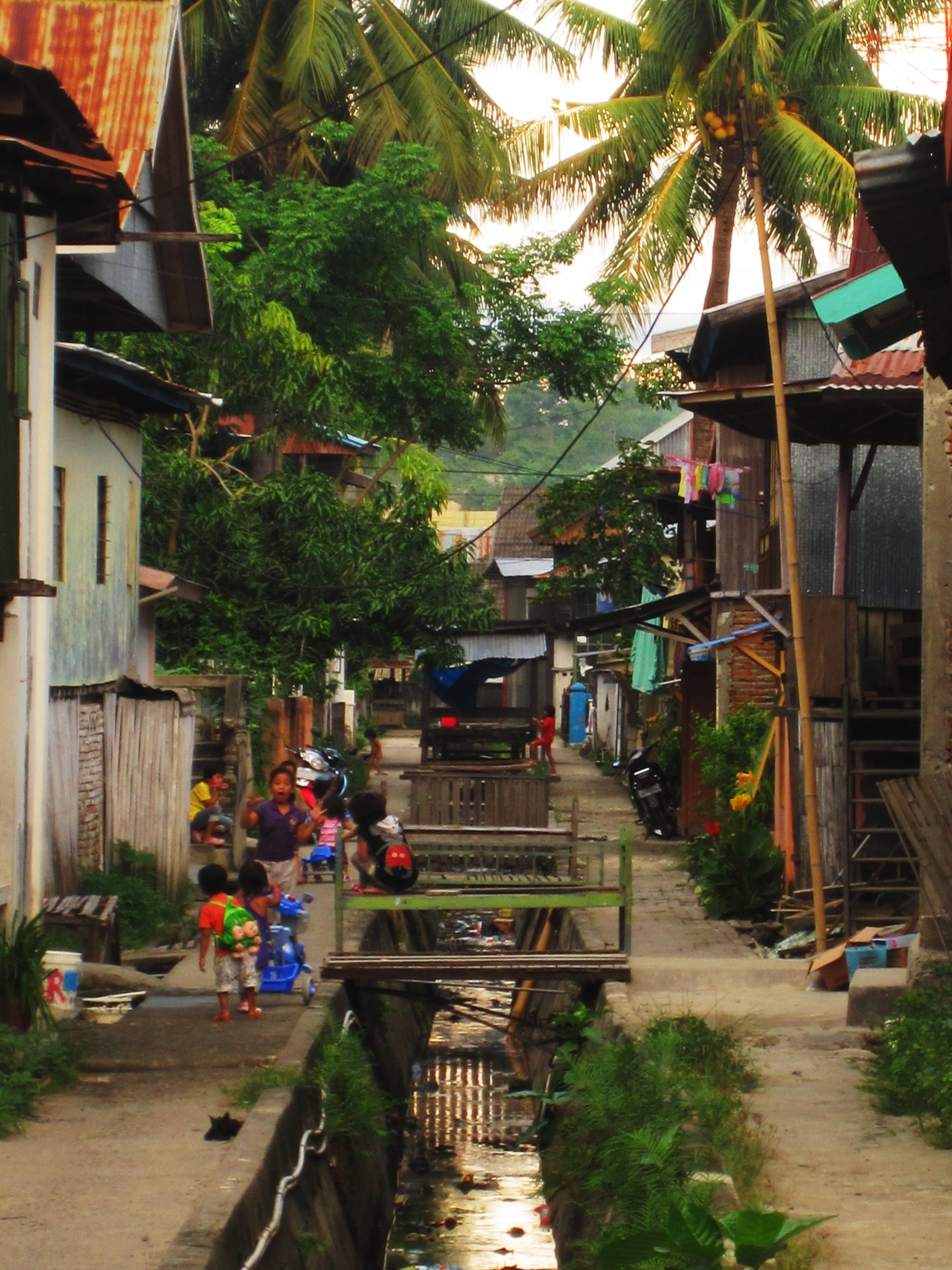
Canal-lined alleyways in Majene

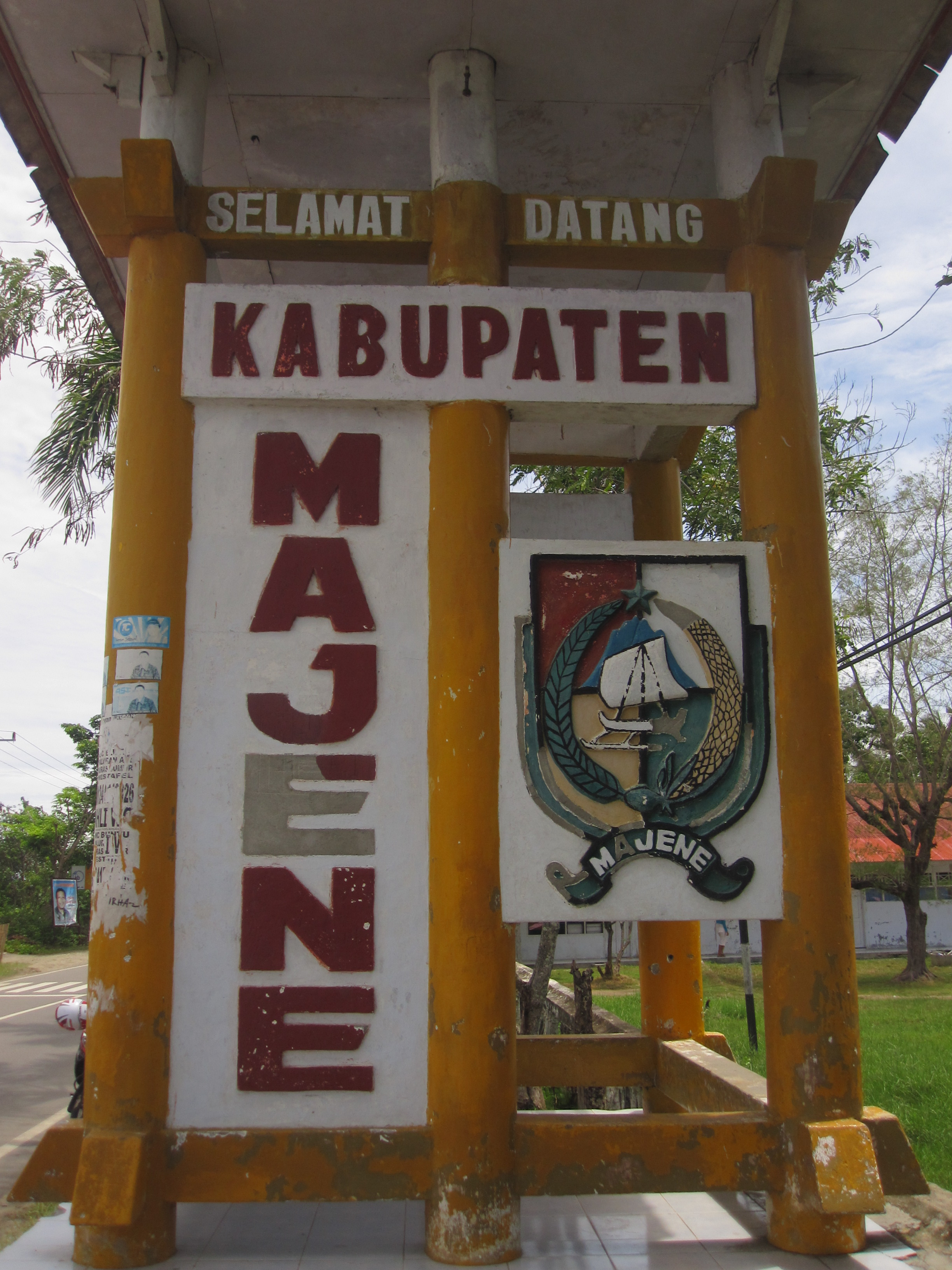
Welcome to Majene sign

Majene is a coastal town (bordered by the Mandar Bay to the south and the strait of Makassar to the west), comfortably nestled in a semicircular valley against a backdrop of rolling, forested hills. The town covers a total area of 55.19 square kilometers.

The town is divided into two districts: Banggae and East Banggae, subdivided into 17 administrative villages (6 urban kelurahan and 11 rural desa).

The town is further divided into 34 distinct neighborhoods. These include:

- Lutang
- Lembang
- Binanga
- Labuang
- Tanjung Batu
- Tangnga-Tangnga
- Parappe
- Pappota
- Kampung Baru
- Lipu
- Pakkola
- Tulu
- Tunda
- Galung Selatan
- Galung Utara
- Galung Barat
- Galung Timur
- Galung Tengah
- Simullu
- Cepala
- Kota
- Balanipa
- Salepa
- Batayang
- Pengali-ali
- Cilallang
- Deteng-Deteng
- Garogo
- Camba
- Pasanggrahan
- Tanangan
- Paleo
- Timbo-Timbo
- Poralle
- Salabose

Each neighborhood appoints a local "Kepala Lingkungan", who supervises the community and approves projects that take place in the neighborhood.

== Education ==
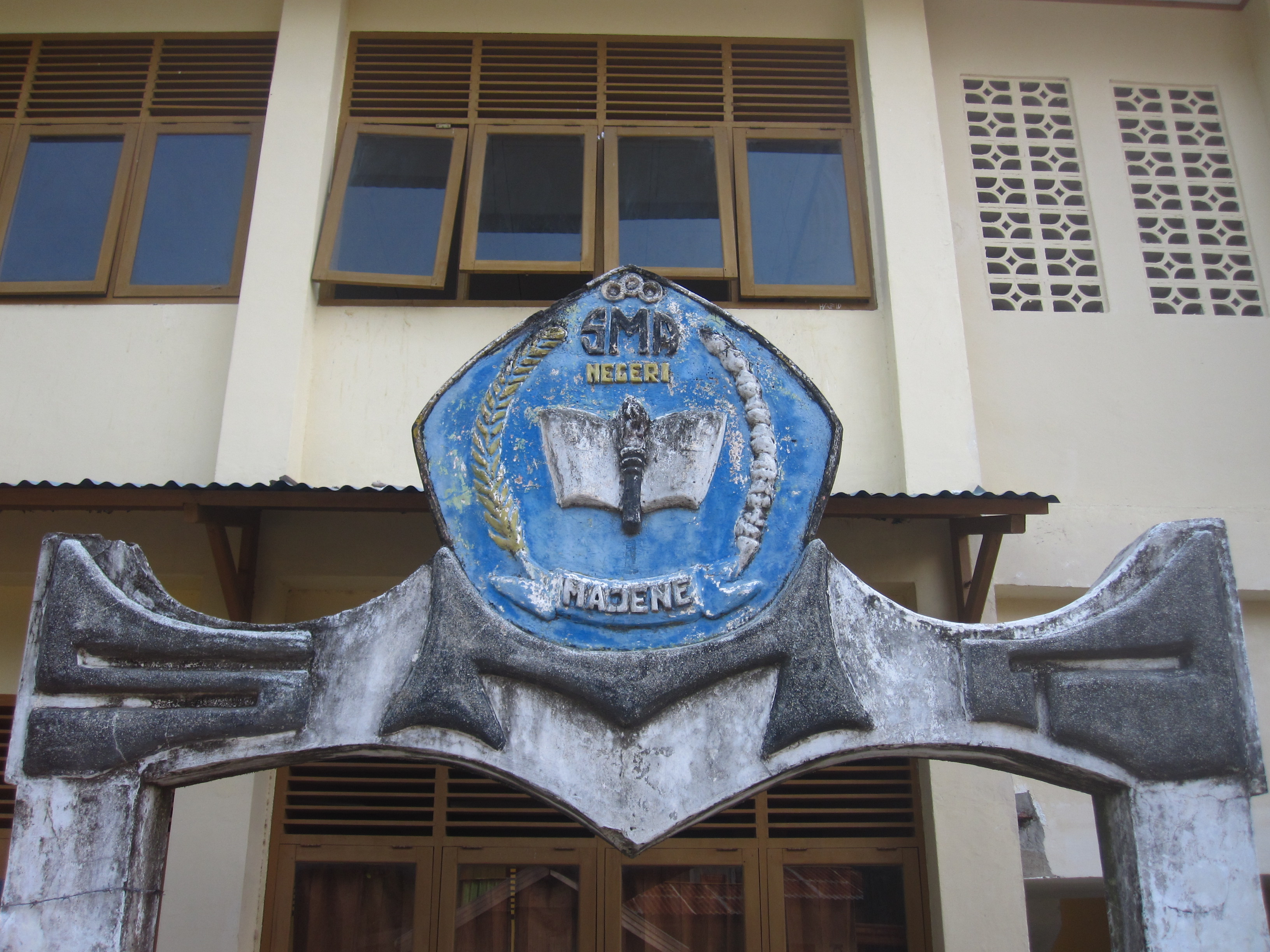
SMA 1 (public high school) in Majene

There are three public high schools (SMA), five public vocational high schools (SMK), four public middle schools (SMP) and over sixty public elementary schools (SD) located within the town limits.

There are also a handful of religious schools in Majene, including both Islamic private schools (Madrasah) and Islamic boarding schools (Pesantren). There are two religious high schools (SMA), three religious middle schools (SMP Madrasah Tsanawyah), and five religious elementary schools (Madrasah Ibtidayah)

Sulawesi Barat University (Universitas Sulawesi Barat) was officially opened on February 19, 2011, by the Vice President of Indonesia, Boediono.

== Politics ==
The current mayor for the entire Majene Regency was Kalma Katta. His residence and office are both located in the town of Majene on a cliff overlooking the sea. He was a member of the "Working Group" (Golongan Karya) party and was up for re-election in May 2011. Mayoral elections take place every 5 years.

In terms of national representation, the entire province of West Sulawesi (Sulawesi Barat) is represented by 4 constituents belonging to DPD and two constituents belonging to DPR, all of whom work in Jakarta. The representatives from DPD are Asri Anas (from Polewali), K.H. Syibli (from Polewali), Iskandar Muda Barlop (from Polewali), and Mulyana Isham (from Mamuju). The representatives from DPR are Salim S. Mengga (from the Democratic Party in Polewali) and Hendra Singkarru (from the PAN party in Polewali). Congressional elections take place every 5 years.

== Media ==
The newspapers "Radar Sulbar" and "Media Indonesia" are the two most prominent sources of news in town, both of which cover the entire province of West Sulawesi. The towny is also serviced by smaller local newspapers and bulletins that are published periodically, as needed.

The only local TV station, Manakara, is operated out of Mamuju, but occasionally features a story from Majene.

== Gallery ==
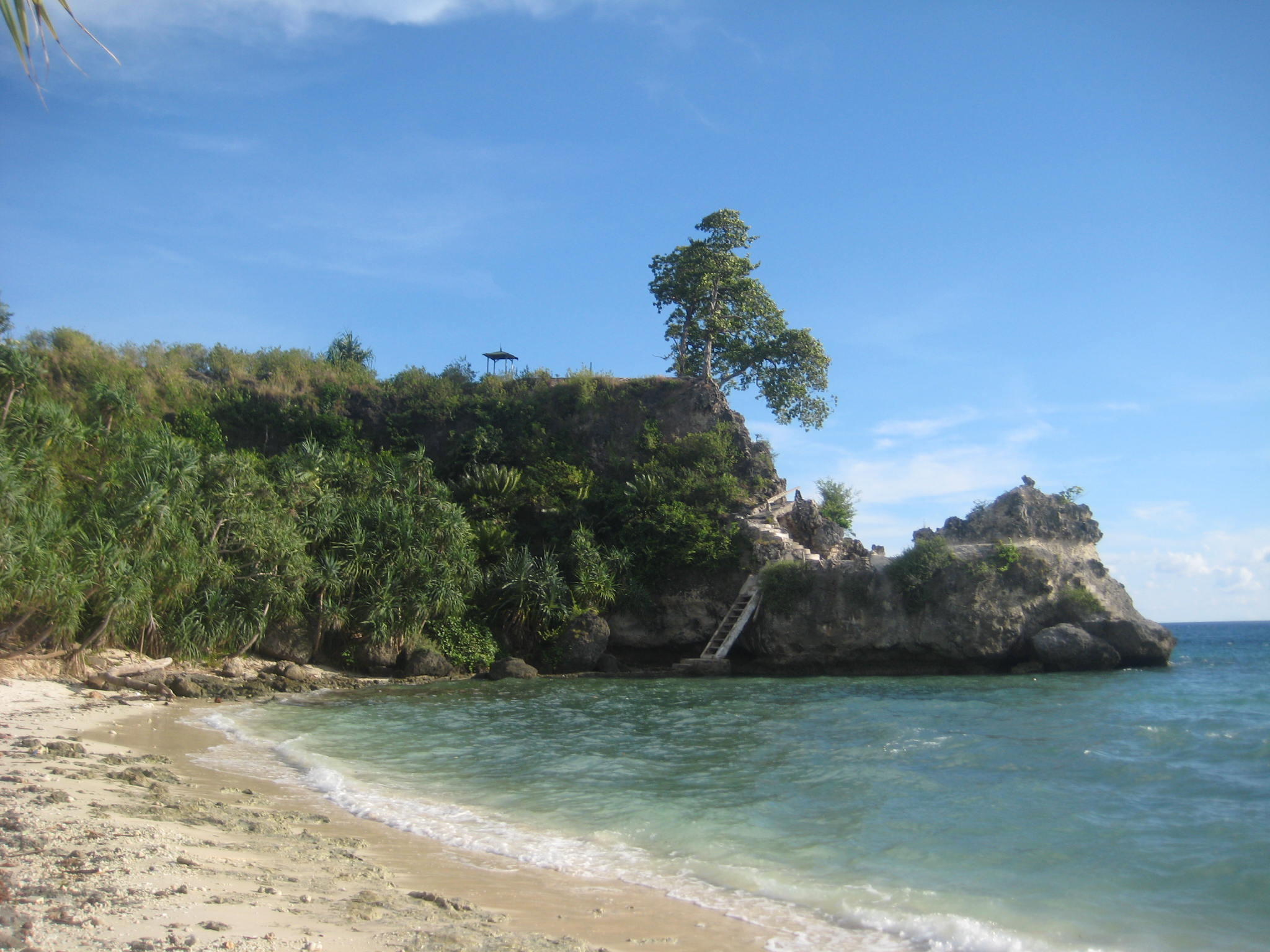
Dato Beach

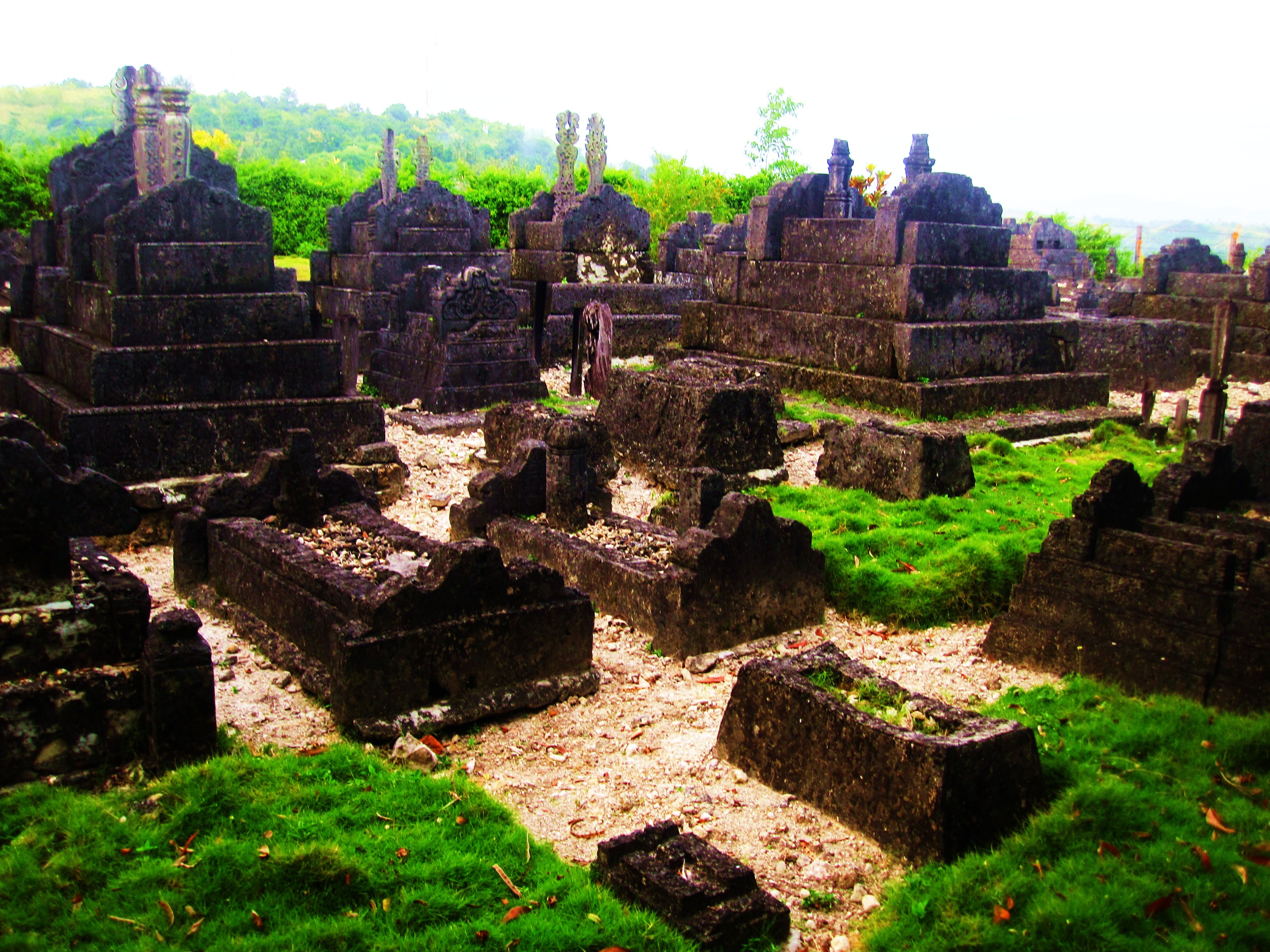
Royal Mandar Graveyard

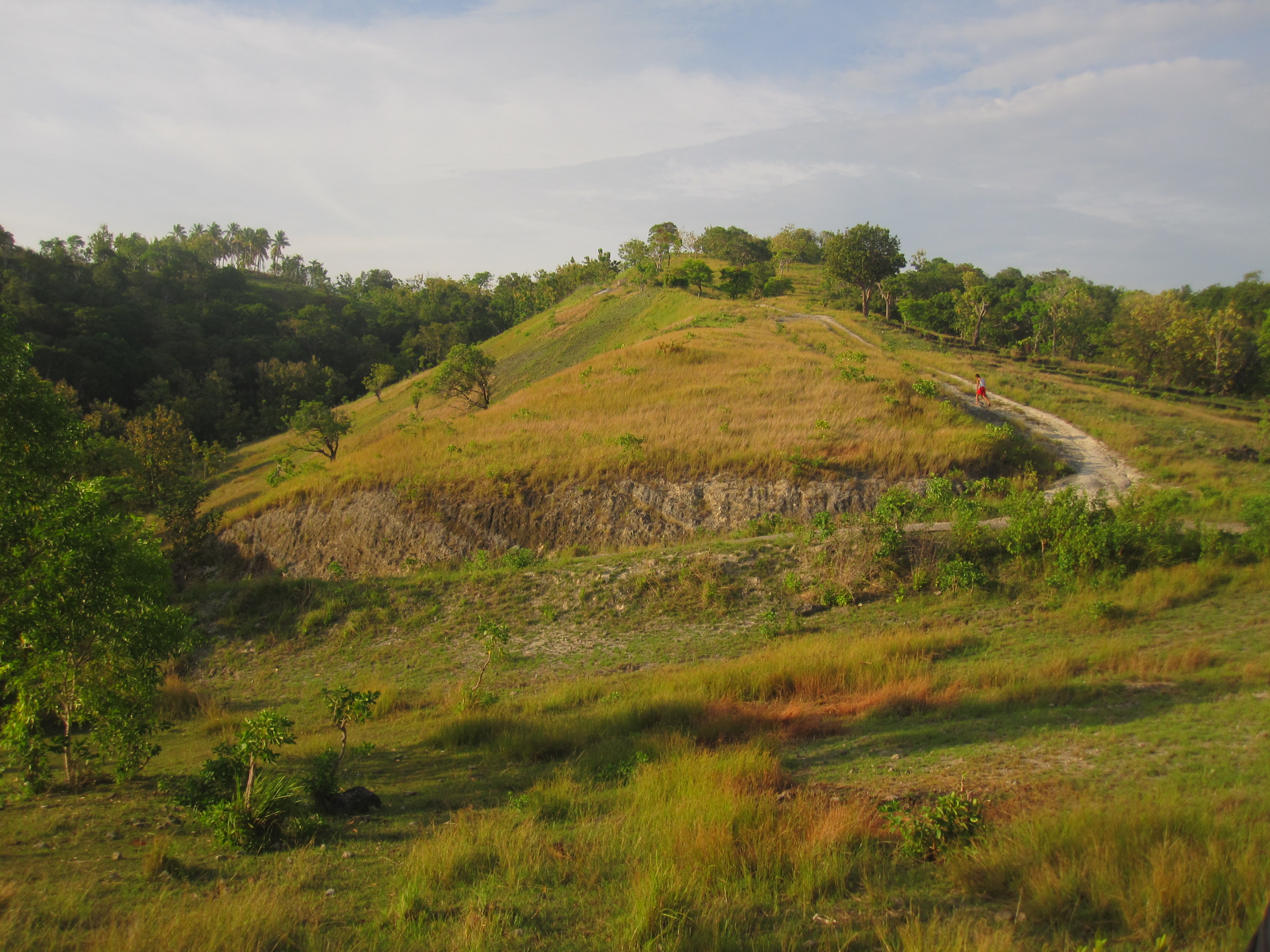
Gunung Galung

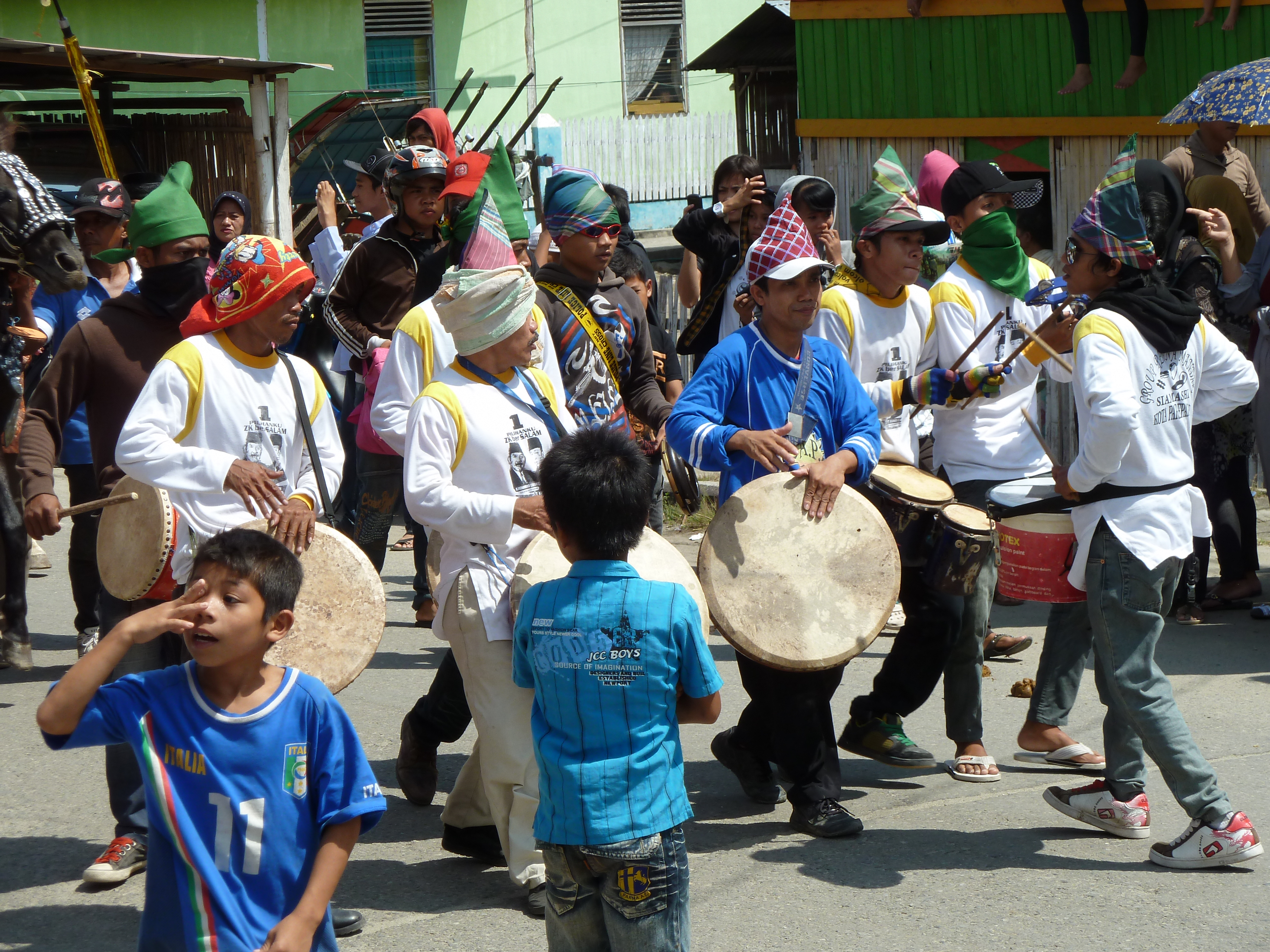
Aqiqah Street Parade

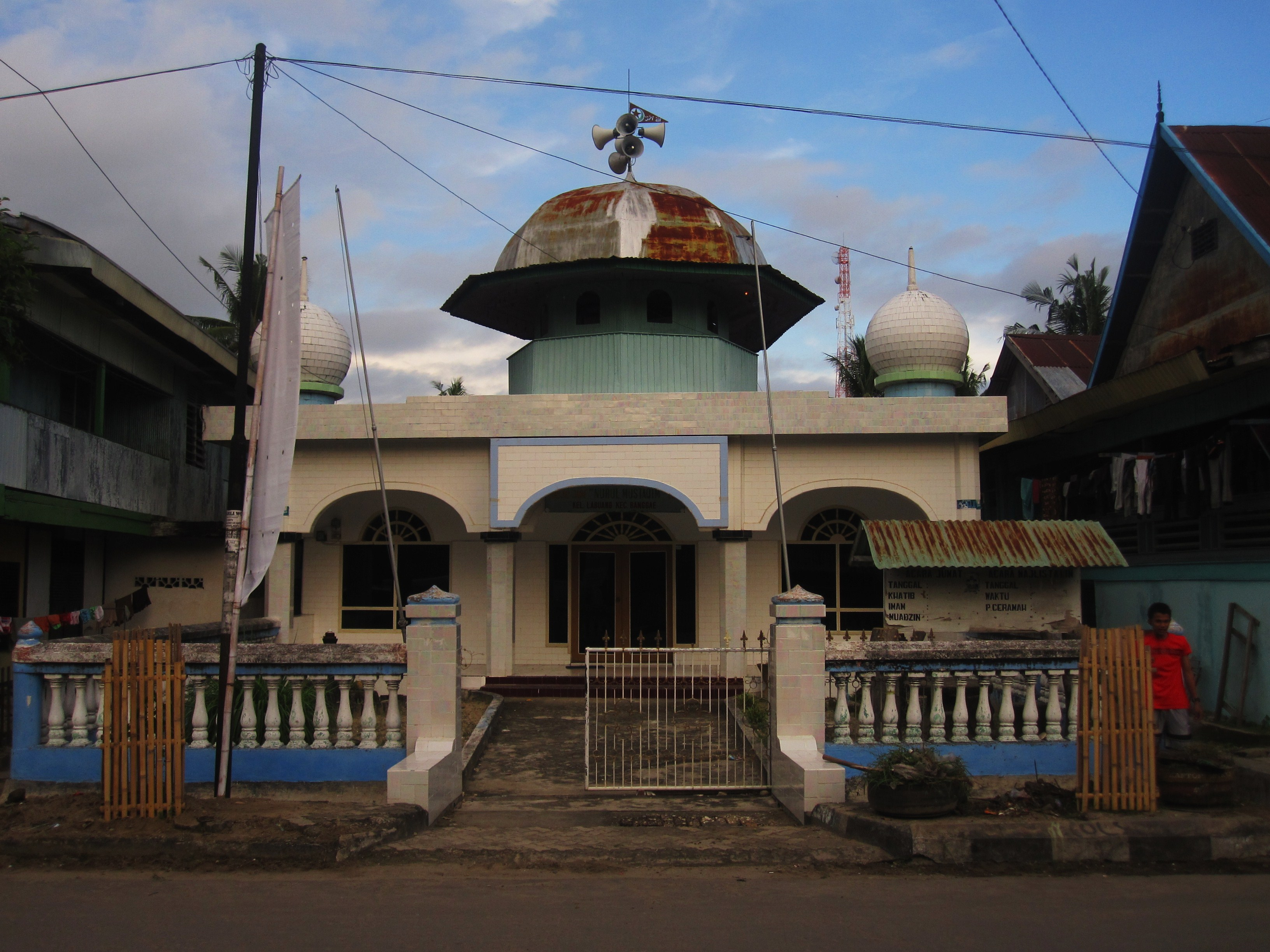
Masjid Lipu Mosque

== See also ==
- List of regencies and cities of Indonesia
