= Ministry of Health =

Ministry of Health may refer to:

Note: Italics indicate now-defunct ministries.

- Ministry of Health (Argentina)
- Ministry of Health (Armenia)
- Australia:
  - Ministry of Health (New South Wales)
- Ministry of Health (The Bahamas)
- Ministry of Health (Bahrain)
- Ministry of Health (Bhutan)
- Ministry of Health (Brazil)
- Ministry of Health (Brunei)
- Ministry of Health (Cambodia)
- Canada:
  - Ministry of Health (Alberta)
  - Ministry of Health (British Columbia)
  - Ministry of Health (Ontario)
  - Ministry of Health (Saskatchewan)
- Ministry of Health (Chile)
- Ministry of Health of the People's Republic of China
- Ministry of Health (Croatia)
- Ministry of Health (Czech Republic)
- Ministry of Health (Denmark)
- Ministry of Health (Ethiopia)
- Ministry of Health (Ghana)
- Ministry of Health (Greece)
- Ministry of Health (Guinea)
- Ministry of Health (Haiti)
- Ministry of Health (India)
- Ministry of Health (Indonesia)
  - Ministry of Health (Pasundan)
- Ministry of Health (Iraq)
- Ministry of Health (Israel)
- Ministry of Health (Italy)
- Ministry of Health (Kenya)
- Ministry of Health (Kuwait)
- Ministry of Health (Laos)
- Ministry of Health (Lithuania)
- Ministry of Health (Malaysia)
- Ministry of Health (Moldova)
- Ministry of Health (Montenegro)
- Ministry of Health (Morocco)
- Ministry of Health (Myanmar)
- Nepal:
  - Ministry of Health (Koshi Province)
- Ministry of Health (New Zealand)
- Nigeria:
  - Adamawa State Ministry of Health
  - Akwa Ibom State Ministry of Health
  - Borno State Ministry of Health and Human Services
  - Lagos State Ministry of Health
  - Rivers State Ministry of Health
- Ministry of Health (Palestine)
- Ministry of Health (Panama)
- Ministry of Health (Peru)
- Ministry of Health (Bangsamoro), Philippines
- Ministry of Health (Poland)
- Ministry of Health (Portugal)
- Ministry of Health (Rhodesia)
- Ministry of Health (Romania)
- Ministry of Health (Russia)
  - Ministry of Health (Bashkortostan)
- Ministry of Health (Rwanda)
- Ministry of Health (Saudi Arabia)
- Ministry of Health (Serbia)
- Ministry of Health (Singapore)
- Ministry of Health (Somalia)
- Ministry of Health (Somaliland)
- Ministry of Health (South Sudan)
- Ministry of Health (Soviet Union)
- Ministry of Health (Spain)
- Ministry of Health (Sri Lanka)
- Ministry of Health (Syria)
- Ministry of Health (Tajikistan)
- Ministry of Health (Timor-Leste)
- Ministry of Health (Turkey)
- Ministry of Health (Turkmenistan)
- Ministry of Health (Uganda)
- Ministry of Health (Vietnam)
- Ministry of Health (Zambia)

== See also ==
- Department of Health
- List of health departments and ministries
- Federal Ministry of Health (disambiguation)
- Ministry of Health & Family Welfare (disambiguation)
- Ministry of Health and Prevention (United Arab Emirates)
- Ministry of Public Health (disambiguation)
- Health minister
- Health (disambiguation)
- 衛生局 (disambiguation)
