= List of incumbent regional heads and deputy regional heads in Southeast Sulawesi =

This is a list of Regional Heads and Deputy Regional Heads in 17 regencies/cities in Southeast Sulawesi who are currently still serving.

== List ==
Regency/ City	Photo of the Regent/ Mayor	Regent/ Mayor	Photo of Deputy Regent/ Mayor	Deputy Regent/ Mayor	Taking Office	End of Office (Planned)	Ref.
Bombana; Regency List of Regents/Deputy Regents		Burhanuddin Anwar		Ahmad Yani	20 February 2025	20 February 2030	
Buton; Regency List of Regents/Deputy Regents		Alvin Akawijaya Putra		Syarifudin Saafa	20 February 2025	20 February 2030	
South Buton; Regency List of Regents/Deputy Regents		Muhammad Adios		La Ode Risawal	20 February 2025	20 February 2030	
Central Buton; Regency List of Regents/Deputy Regents		Azhari		Muhammad Adam Basan	21 March 2025	21 March 2030	
North Buton; Regency List of Regents/Deputy Regents		Afirudin Mathara		Rahman	20 February 2025	20 February 2030	
Kolaka; Regency List of Regents/Deputy Regents		Amri Jamaluddin		Husmaluddin	20 February 2025	20 February 2030	
East Kolaka; Regency List of Regents/Deputy Regents		Yosep Sahaka (Acting Officer)			11 August 2025	20 February 2030	
North Kolaka; Regency List of Regents/Deputy Regents		Nur Rahman Umar		Jumarding	20 February 2025	20 February 2030	
Konawe; Regency List of Regents/Deputy Regents		Yusran Akbar		Syamsul Ibrahim	20 February 2025	20 February 2030	
Konawe Islands; Regency List of Regents/Deputy Regents		Rifqi Saifullah Razak		Muhamad Farid	20 February 2025	20 February 2030	
South Konawe; Regency List of Regents/Deputy Regents		Irham Kalenggo		Wahyu Ade Pratama Imran	20 February 2025	20 February 2030	
North Konawe; Regency List of Regents/Deputy Regents		Ikbar		Abu Haera	20 February 2025	20 February 2030	
Muna; Regency List of Regents/Deputy Regents		Bachrun Labuta		La Ode Asrafil	20 February 2025	20 February 2030	
West Muna; Regency List of Regents/Deputy Regents		La Ode Darwin		Ali Basa	20 February 2025	20 February 2030	
Wakatobi; Regency List of Regents/Deputy Regents		Haliana		Safia Wualo	20 February 2025	20 February 2030	
Baubau; City List of Mayors/Deputy mayors		Yusran Fahim		Wa Ode Hamsinah Bolu	20 February 2025	20 February 2030	
Kendari; City List of Mayors/Deputy mayors		Siska Karina Imran		Sudirman	20 February 2025	20 February 2030	

Notes

- "Commencement of office" is the inauguration date at the beginning or during the current term of office. For acting regents/mayors, it is the date of appointment or extension as acting regent/mayor.
- Based on the Constitutional Court decision Number 27/PUU-XXII/2024, the Governor and Deputy Governor, Regent and Deputy Regent, and Mayor and Deputy Mayor elected in 2020 shall serve until the inauguration of the Governor and Deputy Governor, Regent and Deputy Regent, and Mayor and Deputy Mayor elected in the 2024 national simultaneous elections as long as the term of office does not exceed 5 (five) years.

== See also ==
- Southeast Sulawesi
