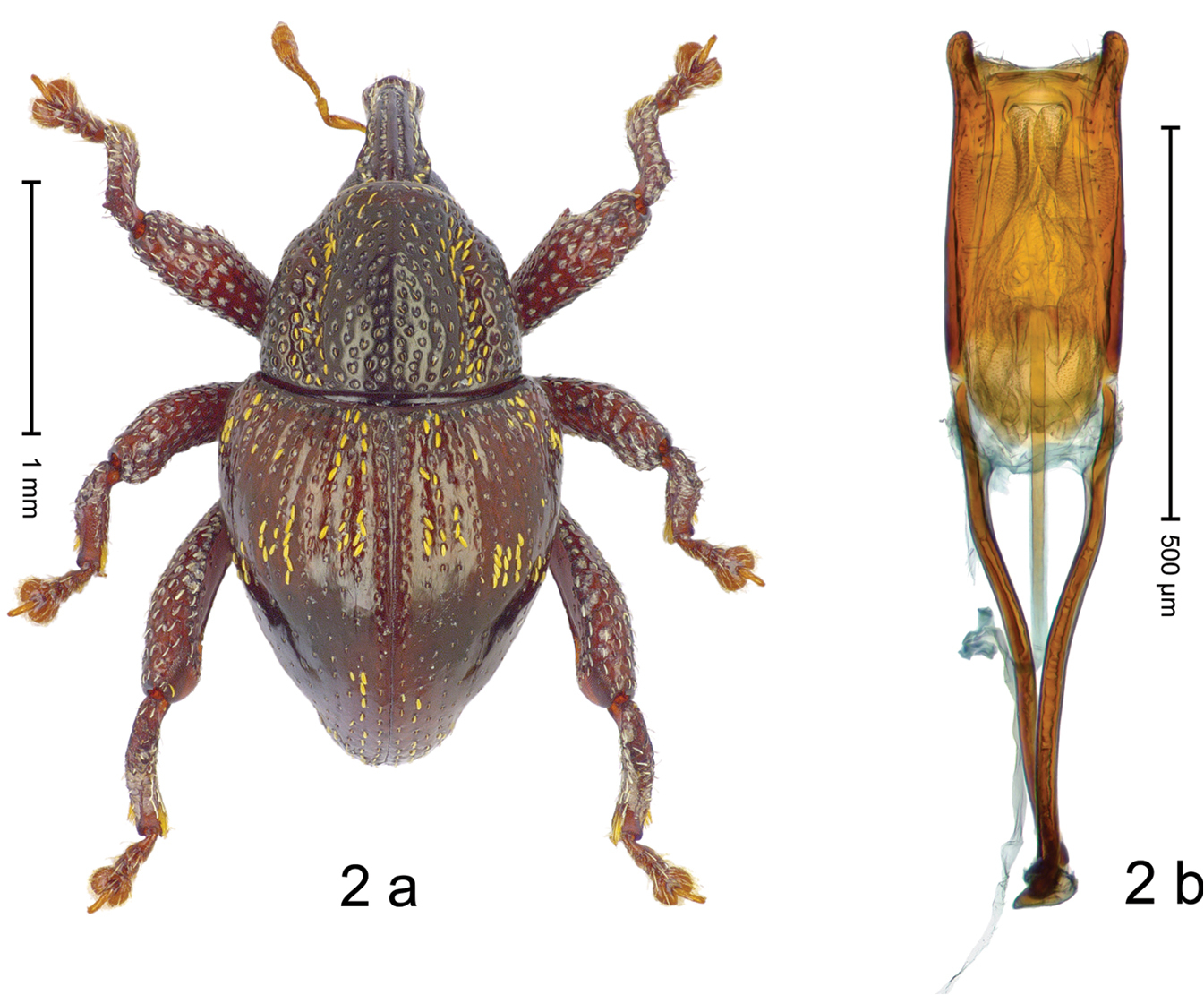

Scientific classification
- Kingdom: Animalia
- Phylum: Arthropoda
- Clade: Pancrustacea
- Class: Insecta
- Order: Coleoptera
- Suborder: Polyphaga
- Infraorder: Cucujiformia
- Family: Curculionidae
- Genus: Trigonopterus
- Species: T. adspersus

Binomial name
- Trigonopterus adspersus Riedel, 2019

= Trigonopterus adspersus =

Species of beetle

Trigonopterus adspersus is a species of beetle found in Indonesia. It was described in 2019 and is named after the scattered scales on its integument. The holotype male is 2.3 mm long. Its antennae are reddish-brown, the legs and elytra are dark reddish-brown, and the rest of the body is black. The species is endemic to Southeast Sulawesi, where it is found in leaf litter of lowland forests at elevations of approximately 480 m.

== Taxonomy ==
Trigonopterus adspersus was described by the entomologist Alexander Riedel in 2019 on the basis of an adult male specimen collected on the road from Wawotobi to Lasolo, in Southeast Sulawesi, Indonesia.

The specific epithet is derived from the Latin adspersus, meaning 'sprinkled, strewn on' and refers to the scattered scales on the species' integument.

== Description ==
The holotype male is 2.3 mm long. Its antennae are reddish-brown, the legs and elytra are dark reddish-brown, and the rest of the body is black. The body is somewhat oval in shape, with a noticeable narrowing between the pronotum and the elytra when viewed from above or from the side. The rostrum features a central ridge flanked by two submedian ridges, with the grooves between them sparsely covered in upright scales. The epistome is slightly swollen and simple in form.

The pronotum has sides that taper slightly and show a mild narrowing near the front. Its surface includes two distinct longitudinal grooves lined with scattered yellow, almond-shaped scales. The central area is broadly raised and densely covered with coarse punctures, with a narrow, nearly smooth line running down the middle. The elytra is marked with small punctures, which become denser and coarser near the base and shoulder regions. The striae are faint, indicated only by fine hairlines, and the surface is dotted with patches of flat yellow scales.

The legs are equipped with toothed femora and ridged undersides. The hind femur has small teeth on its upper side and a rough patch near the tip, likely used to make sound. The back edge of the tibiae have small teeth near the base, and the hind tibia is slightly curved. On the underside, the first two abdominal segments are slightly sunken and mostly smooth, with a few scattered scales. The fifth segment is also concave and sparsely punctured.

In males, the penis is nearly parallel-sided with a blunt tip and a few short hairs. The apodemes are 1.6 times the length of the penis. The transfer apparatus is flagelliform and about the same length as the penis. The ductus ejaculatorius lacks a distinct bulb.

== Distribution ==
Found in leaf litter of lowland forests in Southeast Sulawesi, at elevations of approximately 480 m.
