= North Buton Regency =

Regency in Southeast Sulawesi, Indonesia

North Buton Regency Kabupaten Buton Utara
- Regency
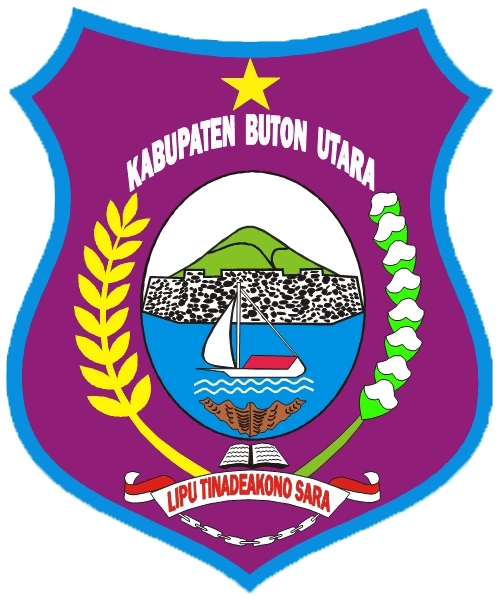
- Coat of arms
- Motto: Lipu Tinadeakono Sara
- Location within Southeast Sulawesi

- Location in Sulawesi and Indonesia North Buton Regency (Indonesia)
- Coordinates: 4°46′48″S 122°58′53″E
- Country: Indonesia
- Province: Southeast Sulawesi
- Capital: Buranga

Government
  - Regent: Afirudin Mathara
  - Vice Regent: Rahman

Area
  - Total: 1,923.03 km^{2} (742.49 sq mi)

Population (mid 2025 estimate)
  - Total: 75,062
  - Density: 39.033/km^{2} (101.10/sq mi)
- Time zone: UTC+8 (ICST)
- Area code: (+62) 403
- Website: butonutarakab.go.id

North Buton Regency (Kabupaten Buton Utara) is a regency of Indonesia's Southeast Sulawesi Province, which was separated from Buton Regency in accordance with Indonesia's Law Number 14 of 2007. The area of the regency, which covers the north part of Buton Island, is 1,923.03 km^{2}. Its population was 54,736 at the 2010 Census and 66,653 at the 2020 Census; the official estimate as at mid 2025 was 75,062 (comprising 38,242 males and 36,820 females). The administrative capital of the regency is at the town of Buranga, in Bonegunu District.

== Administration ==
North Buton Regency is divided into six districts (kecamatan), tabulated below with their areas and their populations at the 2010 Census and the 2020 Census, together with the official estimates as at mid 2025. The table also includes the locations of the district administrative centres, the number of administrative villages in each district (totaling 78 rural desa and 12 urban kelurahan), and its post code.

Kode Wilayah	Name of District (kecamatan)	Area in km^{2}	Pop'n Census 2010	Pop'n Census 2020	Pop'n Estimate mid 2025	Admin centre	No. of villages	Post code
74.10.02	Kambowa	303.44	6,224	7,279	8,098	Kambowa	11 ^{(a)}	93674
74.10.03	Bonegunu ^{(b)}	491.44	7,727	8,819	9,913	Buranga	15 ^{(c)}	93673
74.10.04	Kulisusu Barat (West Kulisusu)	370.47	5,823	6,896	7,740	Lambale	14	93670
74.10.01	Kulisusu ^{(d)}	172.78	20,652	26,276	29,651	Bangkudu	23 ^{(e)}	93672
74.10.05	Kulisusu Utara ^{(f)} (North Kulisusu)	339.64	7,797	9,486	10,776	Waode Buri	14	93675
74.10.06	Wakorumba Utara (North Wakorumba)	245.26	6,513	7,897	8,884	Labuan	13 ^{(g)}	93671
	Totals	1,923.03	54,736	66,653	75,062	Buranga	90	

Notes: (a) includes one kelurahan (Kambowa). (b) includes 4 small offshore islands.
(c) including 2 kelurahan (Bonegunu and Buranga). (d) includes 3 small offshore islands.
(e) comprises 7 kelurahan (Bangkudu, Bonelipu, Lakonea, Lemo, Lipu, Sara'ea and Wandaka) and 16 desa.
(f) includes 4 small offshore islands. (g) including 2 kelurahan (Labuan and Labuan Wolio).

Five other administrative districts (kecamatan) which lie geographically on the west coast of North Buton - Pasir Putih, Pasi Kolaga, Wakorumba Selatan (South Wakorumba), Batukara and Maligano - with a combined area of 400.78 km^{2} and a population of 25,553 in mid 2024 (22,534 at the 2020 Census), are administratively part of Muna Regency.

== Climate ==
Buranga, the regency seat has a tropical savanna climate (Aw) with moderate to little rainfall from July to November and heavy rainfall from December to June.

Climate data for Buranga
Month	Jan	Feb	Mar	Apr	May	Jun	Jul	Aug	Sep	Oct	Nov	Dec	Year
Mean daily maximum °C (°F)	30.8 (87.4)	30.6 (87.1)	30.9 (87.6)	31.0 (87.8)	30.7 (87.3)	30.2 (86.4)	29.7 (85.5)	30.1 (86.2)	30.7 (87.3)	31.6 (88.9)	32.1 (89.8)	31.3 (88.3)	30.8 (87.5)
Daily mean °C (°F)	27.2 (81.0)	27.0 (80.6)	27.1 (80.8)	27.3 (81.1)	27.1 (80.8)	26.7 (80.1)	26.0 (78.8)	26.0 (78.8)	26.3 (79.3)	27.1 (80.8)	28.0 (82.4)	27.6 (81.7)	27.0 (80.5)
Mean daily minimum °C (°F)	23.7 (74.7)	23.5 (74.3)	23.4 (74.1)	23.6 (74.5)	23.5 (74.3)	23.2 (73.8)	22.3 (72.1)	21.9 (71.4)	22.0 (71.6)	22.6 (72.7)	23.9 (75.0)	23.9 (75.0)	23.1 (73.6)
Average rainfall mm (inches)	198 (7.8)	192 (7.6)	193 (7.6)	279 (11.0)	301 (11.9)	192 (7.6)	111 (4.4)	34 (1.3)	22 (0.9)	47 (1.9)	86 (3.4)	152 (6.0)	1,807 (71.4)
Source: Climate-Data.org
