= Sugimanuru Airport =

Sugimanuru Airport Bandar Udara Sugimanuru
- IATA: RAQ; ICAO: WAWR

Summary
- Airport type: Public
- Operator: Government
- Serves: Raha
- Location: Muna Regency, Southeast Sulawesi, Sulawesi, Indonesia
- Time zone: WITA (UTC+08:00)
- Elevation AMSL: 74.63 m (244.8 ft)
- Coordinates: 04°45′38″S 122°34′09.7″E

Map
- Location of the airport in Sulawesi and Indonesia RAQ (Indonesia)

Runways
Direction	Length		Surface
Direction	m	ft	Surface
08/26	1,600	5,249	Asphalt

Sugimanuru Airport (Indonesian: Bandar Udara Sugimanuru) (IATA: RAQ, ICAO: WAWR) is a domestic airport located at Raha, the capital of Muna Regency, Southeast Sulawesi province on the island of Sulawesi in Indonesia.

== Expansion ==
In 2014, the regent of Muna district built a new terminal at a cost of more than 3 billion Rupiah. It was completed in September 2022.
