= Tolaki language =

Austronesian language spoken in Sulawesi, Indonesia

Tolaki
- To'olaki, Tololaki, Lolaki, Laki, Tokia
- Native to: Indonesia
- Region: Southeast Sulawesi
- Ethnicity: Tolaki people
- Native speakers: (330,000 cited 2000 census)
- Language family: Austronesian: Malayo-Polynesian; Celebic; Southeastern; Bungku–Tolaki; Western; West Coast; Tolaki
- Dialects: Mekongga; Rahambuu; Kodeoha; Konawe; Lalomerui; Waru
- Writing system: Latin

Language codes
- ISO 639-3: lbw
- Glottolog: tola1247
- Map of languages on the island of Sulawesi, Bungku-Tolaki languages is colored in dark blue along with other Celebic languages.

Tolaki (To'olaki) is the major language of Southeast Sulawesi, Indonesia. It is an Austronesian language of the Celebic branch.

It is spoken in the Mekongga Mountains region, the Greater Konawe mainland, and around the Pariama Mountains, with 330,000 speakers (2000 census). Tolaki belongs to the Austronesian language family and is a subgroup of the Bungku-Tolaki languages; over time, it has absorbed elements from other ethnic languages—particularly Malay, which serves as the lingua franca and a medium of communication in Sulawesi.

== Dialects ==
The Tolaki language has six dialects, as follows.

- Mekongga (Patikala Village, Tolala District, North Kolaka Regency; Mangolo Urban Village, Latambaga District, Kolaka Regency; Sanggona Village, Konawe District, Konawe Regency; Puundoho Village, Andoolo District, South Konawe Regency; and Poli-Polia Urban Village, Poli Polia District, East Kolaka Regency);
- Rahambuu (Lelewawo Village, Batu Putih District, North Kolaka Regency);
- Kodeoha (Lametuna Village, Kodeoha District, North Kolaka Regency);
- Konawe (South Konawe Regency (Roraya Village, Tinanggea District; Sabulakoa Village, Landono District; Laeya Village, Laeya District; and Tambolosu Village, Laonti District; Pudambu Village, Angata District); the southern part of Konawe Regency (Lolanggasumeeto Village, Walay Village, and Tawanga Urban Village); North Konawe Regency (Wanggudu Urban Village, Asera District; Mopute Village and Tadoloiyo Village, Oheo District; and Molawe Urban Village, Molawe District));
- Lalomerui (Tadoloiyo Village, Oheo District, North Konawe Regency; Lalomerui Village, Routa District, Konawe Regency); and
- Waru (spoken in Mopute Village, Oheo District, North Konawe Regency; Mopute Village, Routa District, Konawe Regency).

== Phonology ==
Consonants
		Labial	Alveolar	Velar	Glottal
Nasal		m	n	ŋ	
Plosive	voiceless	p	t	k	ʔ
Plosive	voiced	b	d	ɡ	
Plosive	prenasal	ᵐb	ⁿd	ᵑɡ	
Fricative		β	s		h
Lateral			l		
Trill			r		

/b/ and /d/ are optionally realized as implosives [ɓ] and [ɗ]. /β/ can also be heard as a glide [w].

Vowels
	Front	Back
Close	i	u
Mid	e	o
Open	a	
