= Bombana Regency =

Regency in Southeast Sulawesi, Indonesia

Bombana Regency Kabupaten Bombana
- Regency
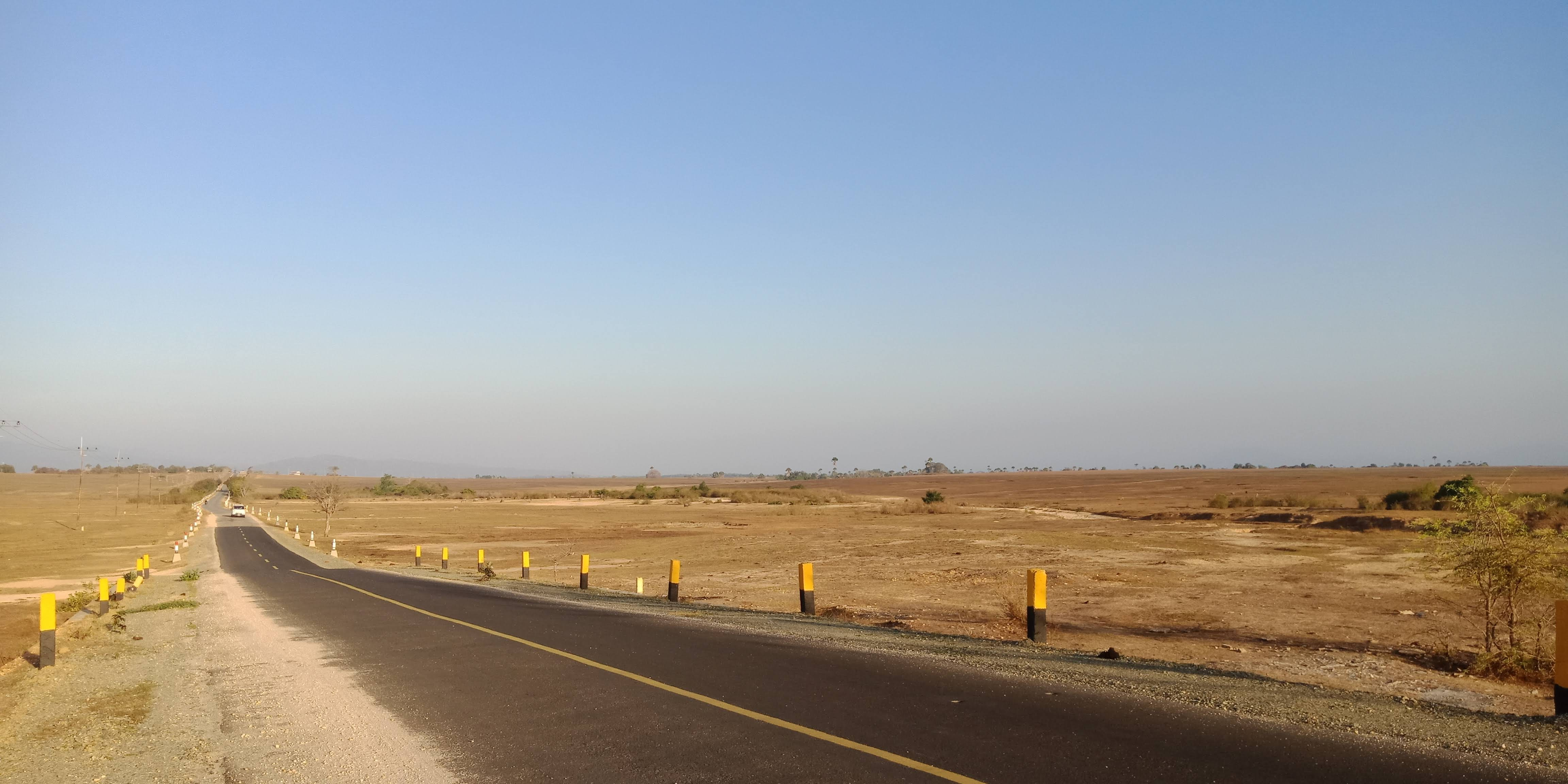
- Grassland on the main road of South Poleang, Bombana, Southeast Sulawesi

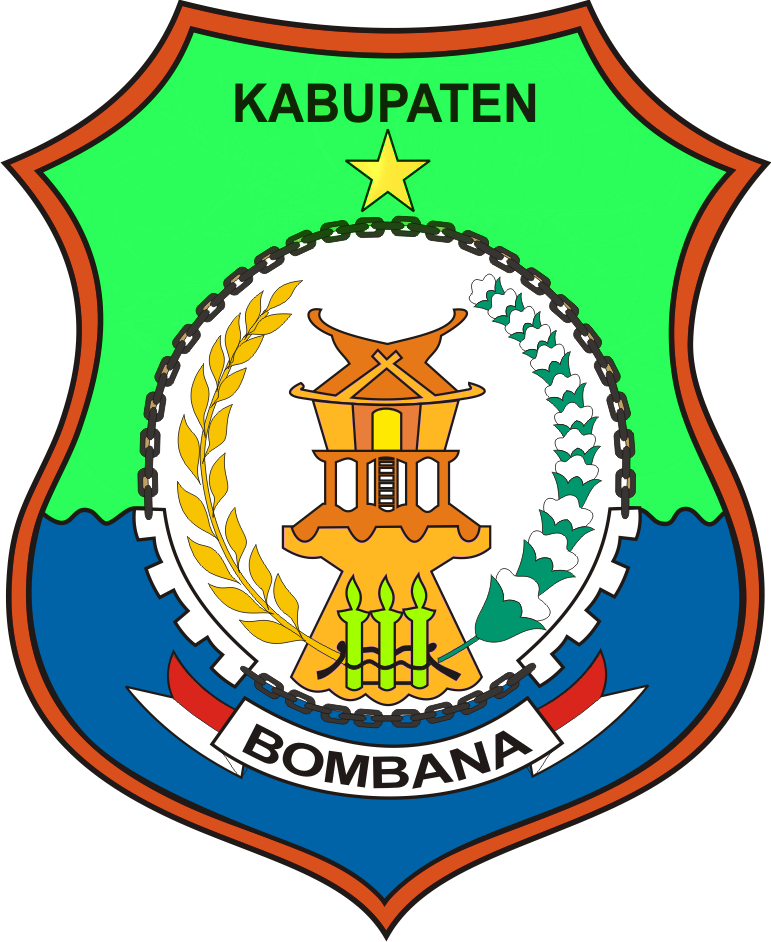
- Coat of arms

- Location within Southeast Sulawesi

- Location in Sulawesi and Indonesia Bombana Regency (Indonesia)
- Coordinates: 4°48′17″S 121°48′32″E
- Country: Indonesia
- Province: Southeast Sulawesi
- Capital: Rumbia

Government
  - Regent: Burhanuddin Anwar
  - Vice Regent: Ahmad Yani

Area
  - Total: 3,293.97 km^{2} (1,271.81 sq mi)

Population (mid 2025 estimate)
  - Total: 169,072
  - Density: 51.3277/km^{2} (132.938/sq mi)
- Time zone: UTC+8 (ICST)
- Area code: (+62) 405
- Website: bombanakab.go.id

Bombana Regency (Kabupaten Bombana) is a regency of Southeast Sulawesi Province of Indonesia. It consists of part of the southeast peninsula of Sulawesi, together with most of the substantial offshore island of Kabaena to the south. The regency was created on 18 December 2003 from part of Buton Regency (which until then had covered most of the islands within the province, as well as part of the Sulawesi "mainland"). It covers an area of 3,293.97 km^{2}, and had a population on 139,235 at the 2010 Census and 150,706 at the 2020 Census; the official estimate as at mid 2025 was 169,072 (comprising 85,232 males and 83,840 females). The administrative centre lies at the town of Rumbia.

== Administration ==
The regency is divided into 22 districts (kecamatan), tabulated below with their areas and their populations at the 2010 Census and the 2020 Census, together with the official estimates as at mid 2025. The table also includes the locations of the district administrative centres, the number of administrative villages (totaling 121 rural desa and 22 urban kelurahan) and of offshore islands in each district, and its post code.

Kode Wilayah	Name of District (kecamatan)	English name	Area in km^{2}	Pop'n Census 2010	Pop'n Census 2020	Pop'n Estimate mid 2025	Admin centre	No. of villages	No. of islands	Post code
74.06.05	Kabaena	Kabaena	101.05	2,849	3,120	3,418	Teomokole	4 ^{(a)}	-	93781
74.06.15	Kabaena Utara	North Kabaena	132.97	3,671	4,031	4,742	Tedubara	6	4	93785
74.06.13	Kabaena Selatan	South Kabaena ^{(b)}	125.49	2,606	3,325	3,695	Batuawu	4	-	93782
74.06.14	Kabaena Barat	West Kabaena	49.81	7,492	7,829	8,774	Baliara	5 ^{(c)}	7	93780
74.06.06	Kabaena Timur	East Kabaena	119.66	6,663	7,566	8,670	Dongkala	7 ^{(d)}	2	93784
74.06.16	Kabaena Tengah	Central Kabaena	288.61	3,254	4,064	5,228	Lengora	7	-	93783
Sub-totals	(Most ^{(e)} of Kabaena Island)		817.59	26,535	29,935	34,527		33	13	
74.06.04	Rumbia		39.91	10,710	12,385	13,025	Kasipute	5 ^{(f)}	-	93771
74.06.08	Mata Oleo		110.00	6,092	7,079	8,307	Lora	11	3	93770
74.06.17	Kepulauan Masaloka Raya	Great Masaloka Islands	2.81	2,978	2,332	2,756	Batu Lamburi	5	5	93778
74.06.18	Rumbia Tengah	Central Rumbia	23.61	6,356	7,267	8,309	Kampung Baru	5 ^{(g)}	-	93771
74.06.03	Rarowatu		213.32	6,225	6,342	7,141	Taubonto	9 ^{(h)}	-	93787
74.06.09	Rarowatu Utara	North Rarowatu	219.69	7,359	7,147	8,125	Aneka Marga	8 ^{(i)}	1	93788
74.06.21	Lantari Jaya		388.81	7,520	8,475	9,865	Lantari	9	-	93774
74.06.22	Mata Usu		355.85	1,264	1,806	2,107	Wia-Wia	5	-	93786
74.06.02	Poleang Timur	East Poleang	100.54	9,109	10,152	11,097	Bambaea	5 ^{(j)}	-	93776
74.06.10	Poleang Utara	North Poleang	227.19	10,454	10,968	12,000	Tanah Poleang	8	-	93777
74.06.11	Poleang Selatan	South Poleang	81.55	6,602	6,911	7,865	Waemputang	5	1	93773
74.06.12	Poleang Tenggara	Southeast Poleang	126.07	3,754	4,246	4,774	Lemo	5	1	93775
74.06.01	Poleang	Poleang town	97.44	14,277	14,336	15,452	Boepinang Barat	10 ^{(k)}	1	93772
74.06.07	Poleang Barat	West Poleang	305.84	11,269	12,258	13,614	Rakadua	11	-	93772
74.06.20	Tontonunu		163.38	5,251	5,391	6,078	Tongkoseng	5	-	93789
74.06.19	Poleang Tengah	Central Poleang	33.31	3,480	3,676	4,030	Mulaeno	4	-	93779
Sub-totals	Mainland		2,476.38	112,700	120,771	134,545		110	12	
		Total Regency	3,293.97	139,235	150,706	169,072	Rumbia	143	25	

Note: (a) includes the two kelurahan of Rahampuu and Teomokole.
(b) notwithstanding the name, this district covers the southwest part of Kabaena island and does not include the southern portion.
(c) includes the kelurahan of Sikeli. (d) includes the two kelurahan of Dongkala and Lambale.
(e) the southern portion of Kabaena Island (including smaller islands off its southeast coast) forms Talaga Raya District, which is part of Central Buton Regency.
(f) comprises four kelurahan (Doule, Kasipute, Lameroro and Lampopala) and one desa. (g) includes the three kelurahan of Kampung Baru, Lauru and Poea.
(h) includes the one kelurahan of Taubonto. (i) includes the one kelurahan of Aneka Marga. (j) comprises two kelurahan of Bambaea and Puu Lemo, plus three desa.
(k) comprises six kelurahan (Barangga, Boeara, Boepinang, Boepinang Barat, Kasabolo and Kastarib) and four desa.

== Climate ==
Most of Bombana Regency has a tropical rainforest climate (Af) with moderate rainfall from August to November and heavy rainfall from December to July. The following climate data is for the town of Rumbia, the seat of the regency.

Climate data for Rumbia
Month	Jan	Feb	Mar	Apr	May	Jun	Jul	Aug	Sep	Oct	Nov	Dec	Year
Mean daily maximum °C (°F)	31.1 (88.0)	31.0 (87.8)	31.2 (88.2)	31.2 (88.2)	30.8 (87.4)	30.1 (86.2)	29.8 (85.6)	30.5 (86.9)	31.3 (88.3)	32.4 (90.3)	32.4 (90.3)	31.5 (88.7)	31.1 (88.0)
Daily mean °C (°F)	27.2 (81.0)	27.2 (81.0)	27.3 (81.1)	27.3 (81.1)	27.1 (80.8)	26.5 (79.7)	25.9 (78.6)	26.1 (79.0)	26.7 (80.1)	27.5 (81.5)	28.0 (82.4)	27.5 (81.5)	27.0 (80.6)
Mean daily minimum °C (°F)	23.4 (74.1)	23.4 (74.1)	23.4 (74.1)	23.5 (74.3)	23.5 (74.3)	22.9 (73.2)	22.0 (71.6)	21.8 (71.2)	22.1 (71.8)	22.7 (72.9)	23.6 (74.5)	23.6 (74.5)	23.0 (73.4)
Average rainfall mm (inches)	193 (7.6)	184 (7.2)	208 (8.2)	188 (7.4)	249 (9.8)	219 (8.6)	148 (5.8)	95 (3.7)	82 (3.2)	68 (2.7)	128 (5.0)	172 (6.8)	1,934 (76)
Source: Climate-Data.org
