= Konawe Regency =

Regency in Southeast Sulawesi, Indonesia

- Regency
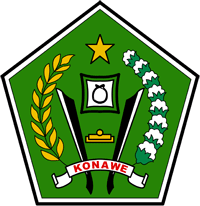
- Seal

- Location within Southeast Sulawesi

- Location in Sulawesi and Indonesia Konawe Regency (Indonesia)
- Coordinates: 3°51′12″S 122°03′13″E
- Country: Indonesia
- Province: Southeast Sulawesi
- Capital: Unaaha

Government
  - Regent: Yusran Akbar
  - Vice Regent: Syamsul Ibrahim

Area
  - Total: 6,118.72 km^{2} (2,362.45 sq mi)

Population (mid 2025 estimate)
  - Total: 270,829
  - Density: 44.2624/km^{2} (114.639/sq mi)
- Time zone: UTC+8 (ICST)
- Area code: (+62) 408
- Website: konawekab.go.id

Konawe Regency is one of the regencies in the province of Southeast Sulawesi, Indonesia. The capital of the regency is Unaaha. The regency was once known as the district of Kendari. The regency had a population of 241,428 at the 2010 Census, but was subsequently reduced by the separation of the offshore island districts (comprising Wawonii Island) as the new Konawe Islands Regency in 2013. It now covers 6,118,72 km^{2} and had a population of 257,011 at the 2020 Census; the official estimate as at mid 2025 was 270,829 (comprising 139,830 males and 130,999 females). Prior to its division in 2003, 2007 and 2013 (see below), Konawe was known as the rice granary of the province of Southeast Sulawesi because half of the province's rice production comes from the Konawe regencies.

== History ==
Konawe Regency was established pursuant to Law No 29 of 1959 (dated 4 July 1959) on the formation of second-level regions in Southeast Sulawesi with the name of Kendari Regency, with the capital being the city of Kendari.

When the Municipality of Kendari was first established under Law No 6 of 1995 (which separated Kendari City from Kendari Regency on 3 August 1995), the residual Kendari Regency consisted of 19 districts (kecamatan) with 334 villages. Over time, administrative changes led to the changes in the numbers of districts and villages. In 2002 Kendari Regency consisted of 23 districts with 631 villages. Based on Government Regulation No. 26 of 2004, on 28 September 2004, the residual regency changed its name to Konawe Regency.

On 25 February 2003, the south part of the regency was split off to create a separate South Konawe Regency (Konawe Selatan) covering eleven districts, and subsequently on 2 January 2007 seven of the northern districts were likewise split off to form a new North Konawe Regency (Konawe Utara). Finally, on 15 May 2013, the seven districts comprising Wawonii Island were split off to form a new Konawe Islands Regency (Konawe Kapulauan).

== Administrative districts ==
Konawe Regency, since the removal of the seven districts on Wawonii Island to form a new Konawe Islands Regency and the creation of six new districts within the remaining area, is now divided into twenty-eight districts (kecamatan), tabulated below with their areas and their populations at the 2010 Census and the 2020 Census, together with the official estimates as at mid 2025. The table includes the location of the district administrative centre, the number of administrative villages in each district (totaling 297 rural desa and 57 urban kelurahan), and its post code.

Kode Wilayah	Name of District (kecamatan)	Area in km^{2}	Pop'n Census 2010	Pop'n Census 2020	Pop'n Estimate mid 2025	Admin centre	No. of desa	No. of kelurahan	Post Code
74.02.11	Soropia ^{(a)}	55.55	7,753	9,162	9,532	Toronipa	14	1	93451
74.02.36	Lalonggasumeeto	34.18	4,612	5,474	5,998	Nii Tanasa	11	1	93450
74.02.05	Sampara	46.62	11,719	9,132	9,881	Sampara	13	2	93458
74.02.21	Bondoala	32.86	8,199	5,225	6,193	Laosu	8	1	93457
74.02.20	Besulutu	108.18	6,759	8,797	9,027	Besulutu	15	1	93459
74.02.33	Kapoiala	35.78	4,063	6,510	7,343	Kapoiala	13	1	93454
74.02.40	Anggalomoare	19.32	^{(b)}	4,979	5,490	Tabanggele	10	-	93455
74.02.39	Morosi	135.91	^{(c)}	6,724	8,064	Besu	10	-	93456
Sub-totals	East Konawe	468.40	43,105	56,003	61,528		94	7	
74.02.01	Lambuya	95.22	6,605	7,638	8,020	Lambuya	9	1	93464
74.02.18	Uepai	160.73	11,819	14,433	14,992	Uepai	17	-	93466
74.02.17	Puriala	157.40	7,405	9,306	9,920	Watundehoa	15	1	93464 ^{(d)}
74.02.37	Onembute	135.33	5,941	7,258	7,698	Onembute	11	1	93465
74.02.04	Pondidaha	66.07	10,437	12,984	13,798	Pondidaha	17	1	93467
74.02.19	Wonggeduku	73.69	19,817	13,910	14,403	Puuduria	15	1	93468
74.02.28	Amonggedo	177.80	9,282	10,891	11,569	Amonggedo Baru	14	1	93463
74.02.41	Wonggeduku Barat (West Wonggeduku)	37.83	^{(e)}	9,031	9,517	Puday	14	-	93469
74.02.03	Wawotobi	134.06	20,177	16,622	23,075	Wawotobi	7	12 ^{(f)}	93462
74.02.25	Meluhu	110.47	4,988	5,507	5,974	Meluhu	8	1	93472
74.02.32	Konawe	18.37	8,035	9,388	10,237	Tawanga	8	4	93462
74.02.02	Unaaha	29.87	22,694	26,179	25,113	Puunaha	_	12 ^{(g)}	93411: 93416 ^{(h)}
74.02.24	Anggaberi	123.12	6,150	7,184	7,286	Andabia	2	6	93417: 93419
74.02.10	Abuki	185.61	14,407	8,407	8,850	Abuki	11	1	93452
74.02.16	Latoma	1,316.25	2,363	2,843	3,162	Waworaha	12	1	93471
74.02.15	Tongauna	47.72	15,451	11,017	11,495	Tongauna	5	5	93460
74.02.31	Asinua	322.24	2,480	2,945	3,199	Ambondia	7	1	93441
74.02.38	Padangguni	210.15	^{(i)}	8,923	8,904	Padangguni	11	-	93442
74.02.	Tongauna Utara (North Tongauna)	157.35	^{(j)}	6,872	7,355	Puundombi	10	-	93460
74.02.23	Routa	2,090.04	1,892	3,523	4,197	Routa	7	1	93453
	Regency Totals	6,118,72	213,038	257,011	270,829	Unaaha	297	57	

Notes: The districts grouped as "East Konawe" are those surrounding Kendari City. The 2010 totals exclude the districts subsequently split off in 2013 to form the Kepulauan Konawe Regency. (a) includes 4 offshore islands.
(b) included in 2010 figure for Sampara District, from which it was cut out. (c) included in 2010 figure for Bondoala District, from which it was cut out.
(d) except for Puanaha village, which has a post code of 93411. (e) included in 2010 figure for Wonggeduku District, from which it was cut out.
(f) the 12 kelurahan are Bose-Bose, Hopa-Hopa, Inalahi, Inolobu, Kasupute, Kulahi, Lalosabila, Nohu-Nohu, Palarahi, Puusinauwi, Ranoeya and Wawotobi.
(g) comprising the 12 kelurahan of Ambekairi, Arombu, Asambu, Asinua, Inolobunggadue, Latoma, Puunaaha, Tobeu, Tumpas, Tuoy, Unaaha and Wawonggole.
(h) except for the kelurahan of Unaaha, which has a post code of 93418. (i) included in 2010 figure for Abuki District, from which it was cut out.
(j) included in 2010 figure for Tongauna District, from which it was cut out.

== Climate ==
Konawe Regency has a tropical rainforest climate (Af) with moderate rainfall from August to November and heavy rainfall from December to July. The following climate data is for Unaaha, the seat of the regency.

Climate data for Unaaha
Month	Jan	Feb	Mar	Apr	May	Jun	Jul	Aug	Sep	Oct	Nov	Dec	Year
Mean daily maximum °C (°F)	31.1 (88.0)	31.0 (87.8)	31.1 (88.0)	31.0 (87.8)	30.5 (86.9)	29.7 (85.5)	29.3 (84.7)	30.2 (86.4)	31.0 (87.8)	32.3 (90.1)	32.3 (90.1)	31.5 (88.7)	30.9 (87.6)
Daily mean °C (°F)	27.1 (80.8)	27.1 (80.8)	27.2 (81.0)	27.2 (81.0)	27.0 (80.6)	26.3 (79.3)	25.7 (78.3)	26.1 (79.0)	26.5 (79.7)	27.5 (81.5)	27.9 (82.2)	27.4 (81.3)	26.9 (80.5)
Mean daily minimum °C (°F)	23.2 (73.8)	23.2 (73.8)	23.3 (73.9)	23.4 (74.1)	23.5 (74.3)	22.9 (73.2)	22.1 (71.8)	22.0 (71.6)	22.1 (71.8)	22.7 (72.9)	23.5 (74.3)	23.4 (74.1)	22.9 (73.3)
Average rainfall mm (inches)	184 (7.2)	193 (7.6)	222 (8.7)	212 (8.3)	273 (10.7)	242 (9.5)	182 (7.2)	123 (4.8)	117 (4.6)	96 (3.8)	111 (4.4)	139 (5.5)	2,094 (82.3)
Source: Climate-Data.org
