= Kolaka Regency =

Regency in Southeast Sulawesi, Indonesia

Kolaka Regency Kabupaten Kolaka
- Regency
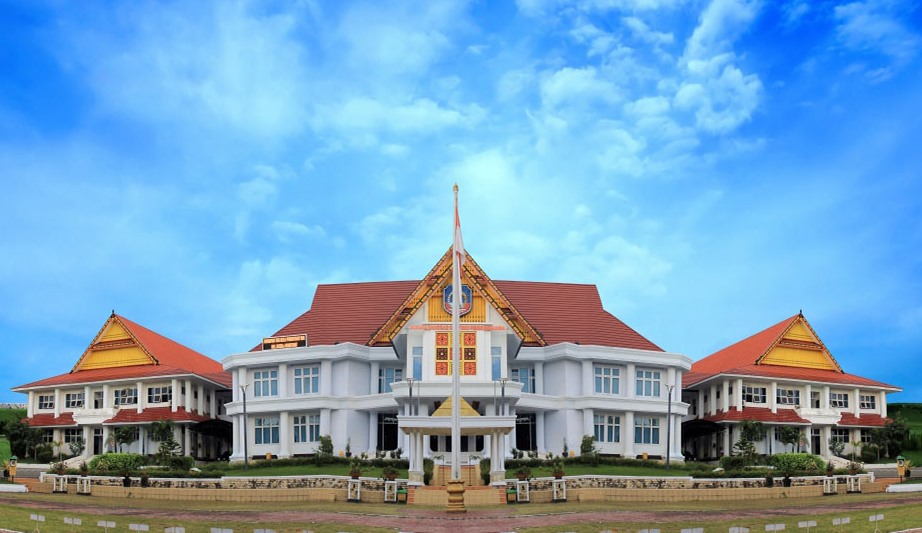
- Regent office of Kolaka

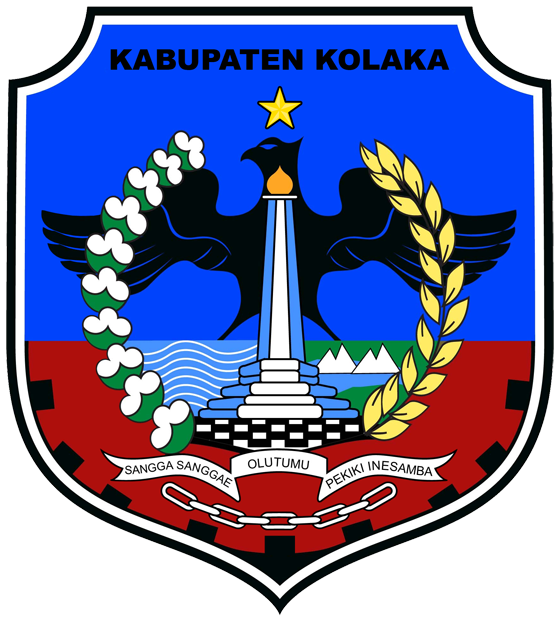
- Coat of arms
- Motto(s): Sanggae Olutomu Pekiki Inesamba (Together to Build a Prosperous Area)
- Location within Southeast Sulawesi

- Location in Sulawesi and Indonesia Kolaka Regency (Indonesia)
- Coordinates: 4°02′57″S 121°36′59″E
- Country: Indonesia
- Province: Southeast Sulawesi
- Capital: Kolaka

Government
  - Regent: Amri Jamaluddin
  - Vice Regent: Husmaluddin

Area (Note: This is the figure supplied by the Regency BPS; the figure quoted by the Province BPS is 3,283.59 km^{2} (1,267.80 sq mi).)
  - Total: 2,960.73 km^{2} (1,143.14 sq mi)

Population (mid 2025 estimate)
  - Total: 269,413
  - Density: 90.9955/km^{2} (235.677/sq mi)
- Time zone: UTC+8 (ICST)
- Area code: (+62) 405
- Website: kolakakab.go.id

Kolaka Regency (Kabupaten Kolaka) is a regency of Southeast Sulawesi Province, Indonesia. It covers an area of 2,960.73 km^{2} (1,143.14 sq mi) and had a population of 208,817 at the 2010 Census, rising to 237,587 at the 2020 Census; the official estimate as at mid 2025 was 269,413 (comprising 139,157 males and 139,256 females). The principal town lies at Kolaka.

== Administrative districts ==
Following the separation (on 18 December 2003) of this regency's then northern districts to create a separate North Kolaka Regency (Kabupaten Kolaka Utara), the Kolaka Regency was until 2013 divided into twenty districts (kecamatan). On 14 December 2012, the Indonesian Parliament approved the establishment of a new East Kolaka Regency (Kabupaten Kolaka Timur), and on 11 January 2013, under Law No. 8 of 2013, the nine eastern kecamatan were removed to form the new East Kolaka Regency, leaving the eleven western kecamatan in Kolaka Regency. A twelfth district (Iwoimendaa) has subsequently been added by splitting off the western villages of Wolo District.

The twelve districts are tabulated below with their areas and their populations at the 2010 Census and the 2020 Census, together with the official estimates as at mid 2025. The table also includes the location of the district headquarters, the number of administrative villages or subdisctricts in each district (totaling 100 rural desa and 35 urban kelurahan), and their post codes.

Kode Wilayah	Name of District (kecamatan)	Area in km^{2}	Pop'n Census 2010	Pop'n Census 2020	Pop'n Estimate mid 2025	Admin centre	No. of desa	No. of kelurahan	Post code(s)
74.01.08	Watubangga	247.75	14,169	15,740	17,011	Watubangga	11	3	93566
74.01.18	Tanggetada	275.38	13,310	15,604	19,349	Anaiwoi	13	1	93564
74.01.24	Toari	96.79	8,925	9,688	10,553	Ranomentaa	9	1	93565
74.01.25	Polinggona	207.07	6,497	5,891	6,312	Polinggona	6	1	93563
74.01.07	Pomalaa	224.87	28,199	31,673	38,301	Tongoni	8	4	93562
74.01.01	Wundulako ^{(a)}	160.39	18,588	21,932	24,790	Kowioha	5	6	93560
74.01.12	Baula	133.74	10,126	12,156	15,014	Puundoho	9	1	93561
74.01.04	Kolaka	139.85	36,147	40,196	44,882	Lamokato	-	7	93511, 93515, 93517 - 93519
74.01.14	Latambaga	219.27	27,558	31,444	34,008	Mangolo	-	7	93512 & 93514
74.01.10	Wolo ^{(b)}	524.86	24,253	24,901	23,819	Wolo	12	2	93553
74.01.20	Samaturu	531.44	21,045	20,480	26,724	Tosiba	17	2	93521
74.01.27	Iwoimendaa	199.33	^{(c)}	7,882	8,650	Iwoimendaa	10	-	93552
	Totals	2,960.73	208,817	237,587	269,413	Kolaka	100	35	

Notes: (a) including a group of 10 islands off the west coast of Kolaka, of which the largest are Pulau Padamarang, Pulau Maniama and Pulau Buaya.
(b) including the 2 offshore islands of Pulau Laburoko and Pulau Pisang.
(c) the 2010 population of the new Iwoimendaa District is included in the 2010 figure for Wolo District, from which it was subsequently cut out.

== Climate ==
Kolaka Regency has a tropical rainforest climate (Af) with moderate rainfall from August to October and heavy rainfall from November to July. The following climate data is for the town of Kolaka, the seat of the regency.

Climate data for Kolaka
Month	Jan	Feb	Mar	Apr	May	Jun	Jul	Aug	Sep	Oct	Nov	Dec	Year
Mean daily maximum °C (°F)	31.0 (87.8)	31.0 (87.8)	31.1 (88.0)	31.2 (88.2)	30.8 (87.4)	30.1 (86.2)	29.9 (85.8)	30.6 (87.1)	31.4 (88.5)	32.5 (90.5)	32.2 (90.0)	31.5 (88.7)	31.1 (88.0)
Daily mean °C (°F)	27.1 (80.8)	27.2 (81.0)	27.2 (81.0)	27.3 (81.1)	27.1 (80.8)	26.5 (79.7)	26.0 (78.8)	26.2 (79.2)	26.7 (80.1)	27.6 (81.7)	27.8 (82.0)	27.5 (81.5)	27.0 (80.6)
Mean daily minimum °C (°F)	23.3 (73.9)	23.4 (74.1)	23.4 (74.1)	23.5 (74.3)	23.5 (74.3)	22.9 (73.2)	22.1 (71.8)	21.9 (71.4)	22.1 (71.8)	22.7 (72.9)	23.5 (74.3)	23.5 (74.3)	23.0 (73.4)
Average rainfall mm (inches)	193 (7.6)	189 (7.4)	226 (8.9)	221 (8.7)	266 (10.5)	196 (7.7)	142 (5.6)	100 (3.9)	92 (3.6)	115 (4.5)	143 (5.6)	142 (5.6)	2,025 (79.6)
Source: Climate-Data.org
