= North Konawe Regency =

Regency in Southeast Sulawesi, Indonesia

North Konawe Regency Kabupaten Konawe Utara
- Regency
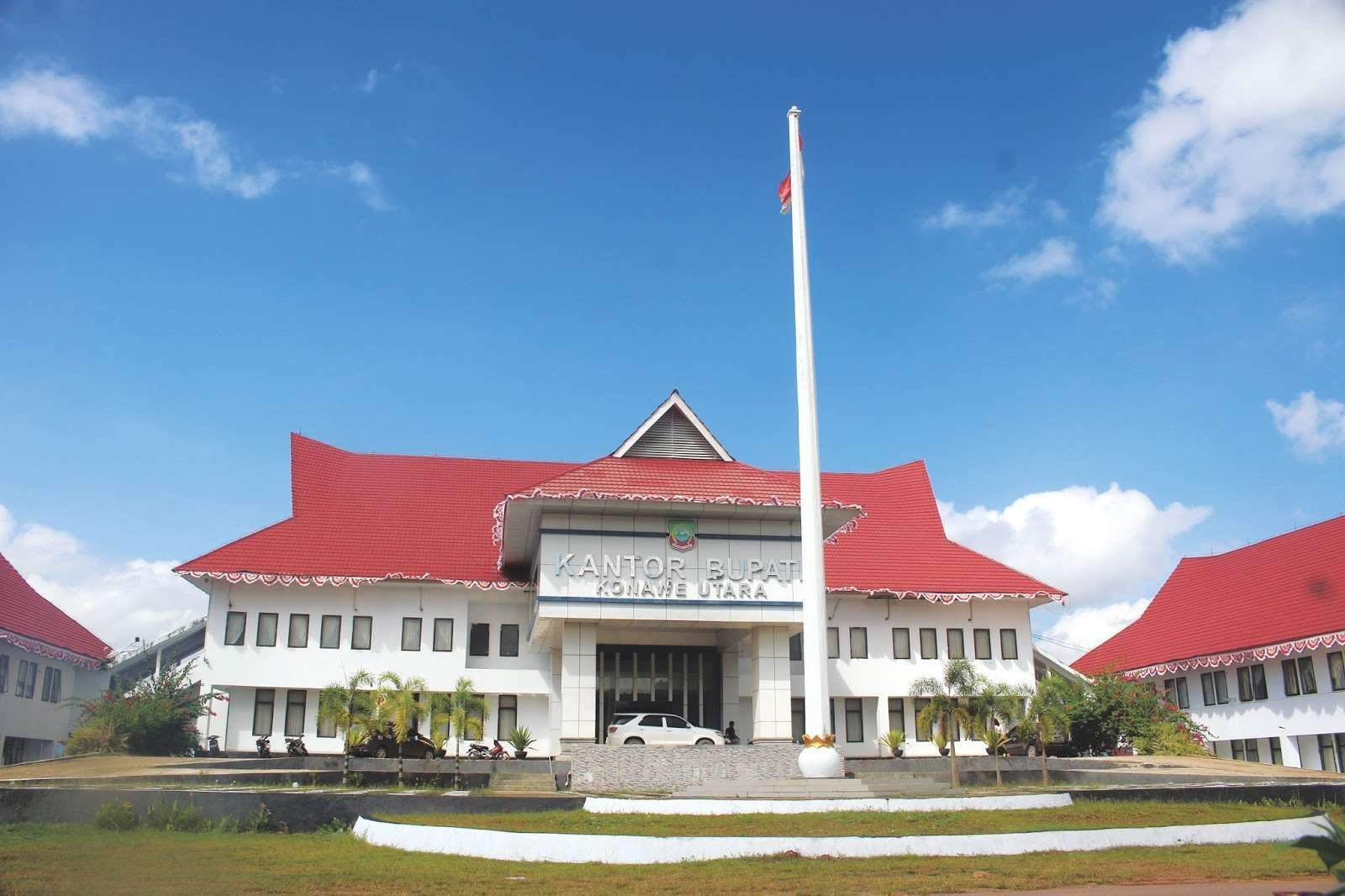
- Regent office of North Konawe

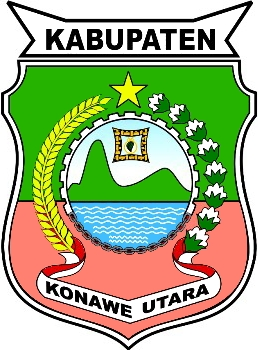
- Coat of arms

- Location within Southeast Sulawesi

- Location in Sulawesi and Indonesia North Konawe Regency (Indonesia)
- Coordinates: 3.4114°S 122.0200°E
- Country: Indonesia
- Province: Southeast Sulawesi
- Capital: Asera

Government
  - Regent: Ikbar
  - Vice Regent: Abu Haera

Area
  - Total: 5,101.76 km^{2} (1,969.80 sq mi)

Population (mid 2025 estimate)
  - Total: 84,225
  - Density: 16.509/km^{2} (42.758/sq mi)
- Time zone: UTC+8 (ICST)
- Area code: (+62) 401
- Website: konaweutarakab.go.id

North Konawe Regency (Kabupaten Konawe Utara) is a regency of Southeast Sulawesi Province, Indonesia. It was formed on 2 January 2007 by splitting off seven of the northern districts of Konawe Regency to form a new North Konawe Regency (Kabupaten Konawe Utara). It is surrounded on all landward sides by the remaining area of the Konawe Regency, except in the northeast, where it borders on Sulawesi Tengah (Central Sulawesi) Province. It covers a land area of 5,101.76 km^{2}. It had a population of 51,447 at the 2010 Census and 67,871 at the 2020 Census; the official estimate as at mid 2025 was 84,225 (comprising 43,288 males and 40,937 females). The principal town lies at Asera.

== Administration ==
The North Konawe Regency was divided at the time of the 2010 Census into seven districts (kecamatan), but six additional districts were subsequently created by division of the original districts. The districts are tabulated below with their populations at the 2010 Census and the 2020 Census, together with the official estimates as at mid 2025. The table also includes the administrative centres of each district and the number of administrative villages in each district (totaling 159 rural desa and 11 urban kelurahan).

Kode Wilayah	Name of District (kecamatan)	Area in km^{2}	Pop'n Census 2010	Pop'n Census 2020	Pop'n Estimate mid 2025	Admin centre	No. of villages
74.09.07	Sawa	93.76	7,105	4,516	5,248	Sawa	14 ^{(a)}
74.09.10	Motui	61.30	^{(b)}	4,705	6,133	Bende	15 ^{(a)}
74.09.06	Lembo	78.12	4,344	5,422	6,196	Lembo	12 ^{(a)}
74.09.05	Lasolo	139.40	10,463	8,129	10,009	Tinobu	17 ^{(a)}
74.09.11	Wawolesea	149.40	^{(c)}	3,496	4,003	Wawolosea	8
74.09.12	Lasolo Kepulauan (Lasolo Islands)	62.42	^{(c)}	2,224	2,955	Boenaga	6
74.09.04	Molawe	365.06	5,412	6,608	8,040	Molawe	9 ^{(a)}
74.09.01	Asera	863.32	13,745	7,604	9,377	Asera	19 ^{(d)}
74.09.09	Andowia	595.90	^{(e)}	7,044	9,630	Andowia	15 ^{(a)}
74.09.08	Oheo	738.50	^{(e)}	4,614	5,806	Linomoiyo	17 ^{(a)}
74.09.03	Langgikima	476.75	3,998	5,204	6,910	Langgikima	12 ^{(a)}
74.09.02	Wiwirano	874.30	6,466	5,561	6,414	Lamonae	15 ^{(a)}
74.09.13	Landawe	603.53	^{(f)}	2,744	3,504	Hialu	11
	Totals	5,101.76	51,447	67,871	84,225	Asera	170

Notes: (a) includes one kelurahan - the admin centre as named.
(b) The 2010 population of Motui District is included in the figure for Sawa District, from which it was subsequently cut out.
(c) the 2010 populations of Wawolesea and Lasolo Kepulauan Districts are included in the figure for Lasolo District, from which they were subsequently cut out.
(d) including two kelurahan - Asera and Wanggudu.
(e) the 2010 populations of Andowia and Oheo Districts are included in the figure for Asera District, from which they were subsequently cut out.
(f) The 2010 population of Landawe District is included in the figure for Wiwirano District, from which it was subsequently cut out.

== Wawolesea Karst ==
Wawolesea Karst is rare and unique, 80 kilometres north of Kendari or just 10 kilometers from Tanjung Taipa Beach. There are a 500 square metres pond several metres from the beach with altar and travertine columns which formed by salty water hot fountain. The salty water came from tunnels below sea level and the hot water with temperature between 35 and 45 Celsius degrees came from active tectonic. The hot sandy around them is suitable for Maleo birds to bury their eggs which will hatch by hot sandy temperature. Anoa as endemic animal can be found also in this area.
