= Wawonii =

Wawonii may be,

- Wawonii Island
- Wawonii language
