= West Muna Regency =

Regency in Southeast Sulawesi, Indonesia

West Muna Regency Kabupaten Muna Barat
- Regency
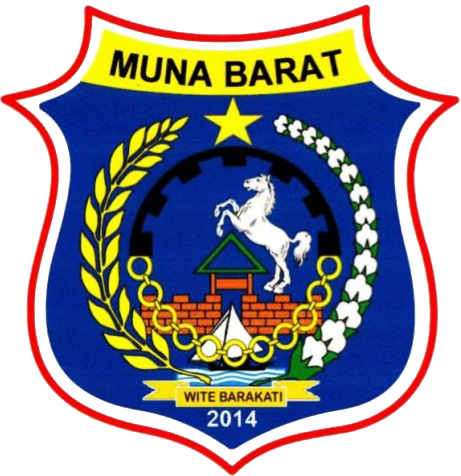
- Coat of arms
- Motto: Wite Barakati
- Location within Southeast Sulawesi

- Location in Sulawesi and Indonesia West Muna Regency (Indonesia)
- Coordinates: 4.7900362°S 122.4966354°E
- Country: Indonesia
- Province: Southeast Sulawesi
- Established: 24 July 2014; 12 years ago
- Founder: Government of Indonesia
- Capital: Laworo

Government
  - Regent: La Ode Darwin
  - Vice Regent: Ali Basa

Area
  - Total: 772.63 km^{2} (298.31 sq mi)

Population (mid 2025 Estimate)
  - Total: 93,060
  - Density: 120.4/km^{2} (312.0/sq mi)
- Time zone: UTC+8 (ICST)
- Area code: (+62) 403
- Website: munabaratkab.go.id

West Muna Regency (Indonesian: Kabupaten Muna Barat) is a regency of Southeast Sulawesi, Indonesia. It comprises the northwest portion of Muna Island and islands in the Straits of Tiworo. It was established under Act No.14 of 2014, dated 23 July 2014 by separation from the Muna Regency. It covers an area of 906.28 km^{2}, and reported a population of 71,632 at the 2010 Census; the 2020 Census recorded a population of 84,590, and the official estimate as of mid 2025 was 93,060 (comprising 46,061 males and 46,999 females). Its administrative centre is Laworo in the Tiworo Islands District.

== Administrative districts ==
The West Muna Regency is divided into eleven districts (kecamatan), tabulated below with their areas and their populations at the 2010 Census and the 2020 Census, together with the official estimates as at mid 2025. The table also includes the locations of the district headquarters, the number of administrative villages in each district (totaling 81 rural desa and 5 urban kelurahan), and its post code.

| Kode Wilayah | Name of District (kecamatan) | Area in km^{2} | Pop'n Census 2010 | Pop'n Census 2020 | Pop'n Estimate mid 2025 | Admin centre | No. of Villages | Post Code |
|---|---|---|---|---|---|---|---|---|
| 74.13.09 | Tiworo Kepulauan ^{(a)} (Tiworo Islands) | 77.90 | 6,406 | 7,653 | 8,549 | Kambara | 9 ^{(b)} | 93653 |
| 74.13.06 | Maginti ^{(c)} | 40.57 | 8,226 | 8,953 | 9,426 | Pajala | 8 | 93643 |
| 74.14.07 | Tiworo Tengah ^{(d)} (Central Tiworo) | 82.35 | 6,503 | 7,604 | 8,569 | Wapae Jaya | 8 | 93654 |
| 74.13.05 | Tiworo Selatan (South Tiworo) | 66.98 | 4,830 | 5,738 | 6,224 | Kasimpa Jaya | 5 | 93644 |
| 74.13.08 | Tiworo Utara ^{(e)} (North Tiworo) | 62.05 | 4,863 | 5,684 | 6,098 | Tondasi | 7 | 93656 |
| 74.13.03 | Lawa | 85.17 | 7,430 | 8,731 | 9,296 | Lawa | 8 ^{(f)} | 93651 |
| 74.13.01 | Sawerigadi | 102.60 | 6,284 | 8,047 | 9,132 | Sawerigadi | 10 | 93657 |
| 74.13.02 | Barangka | 33.09 | 5,978 | 7,311 | 8,341 | Barangka | 8 | 93650 |
| 74.13.04 | Wadaga | 175.05 | 5,706 | 6,387 | 6,969 | Wadaga | 7 | 93652 |
| 74.13.10 | Kusambi | 103.33 | 10,699 | 12,944 | 14,129 | Kusambi | 10 ^{(g)} | 93655 |
| 74.13.11 | Napano Kusambi | 77.19 | 4,707 | 5,538 | 6,327 | Lahaji | 6 | 93658 |
| | Totals | 906.28 | 71,632 | 84,590 | 93,060 | Laworo | 86 | |

Notes:

- (a) Tiworo Kepulauan District includes 4 small islands off the north coast of Muna Island, but lies mainly on Muna Island and includes the regency administrative capital of Laworo. (b) including 2 kelurahan (Tiworo and Waumere).
- (c) Maginti District includes 7 small islands off the west coast of Muna Island. (d) Tiworo Tengah District includes some small islands off the west coast of Muna.
- (e) Tiworo Utara District consists mainly of a group of 12 islands off the northwest coast of Muna Island, but also includes a small northwesterly part of Muna Island itself (Tondasi Village, covering 17.65 km^{2}, with 779 inhabitants in 2020).
- (f) including 2 kelurahan (Lapadaku and Wamelai). (g) including one kelurahan - the town of Konawe.
