= East Kolaka Regency =

Regency in Southeast Sulawesi, Indonesia

East Kolaka Regency Kabupaten Kolaka Timur
- Regency
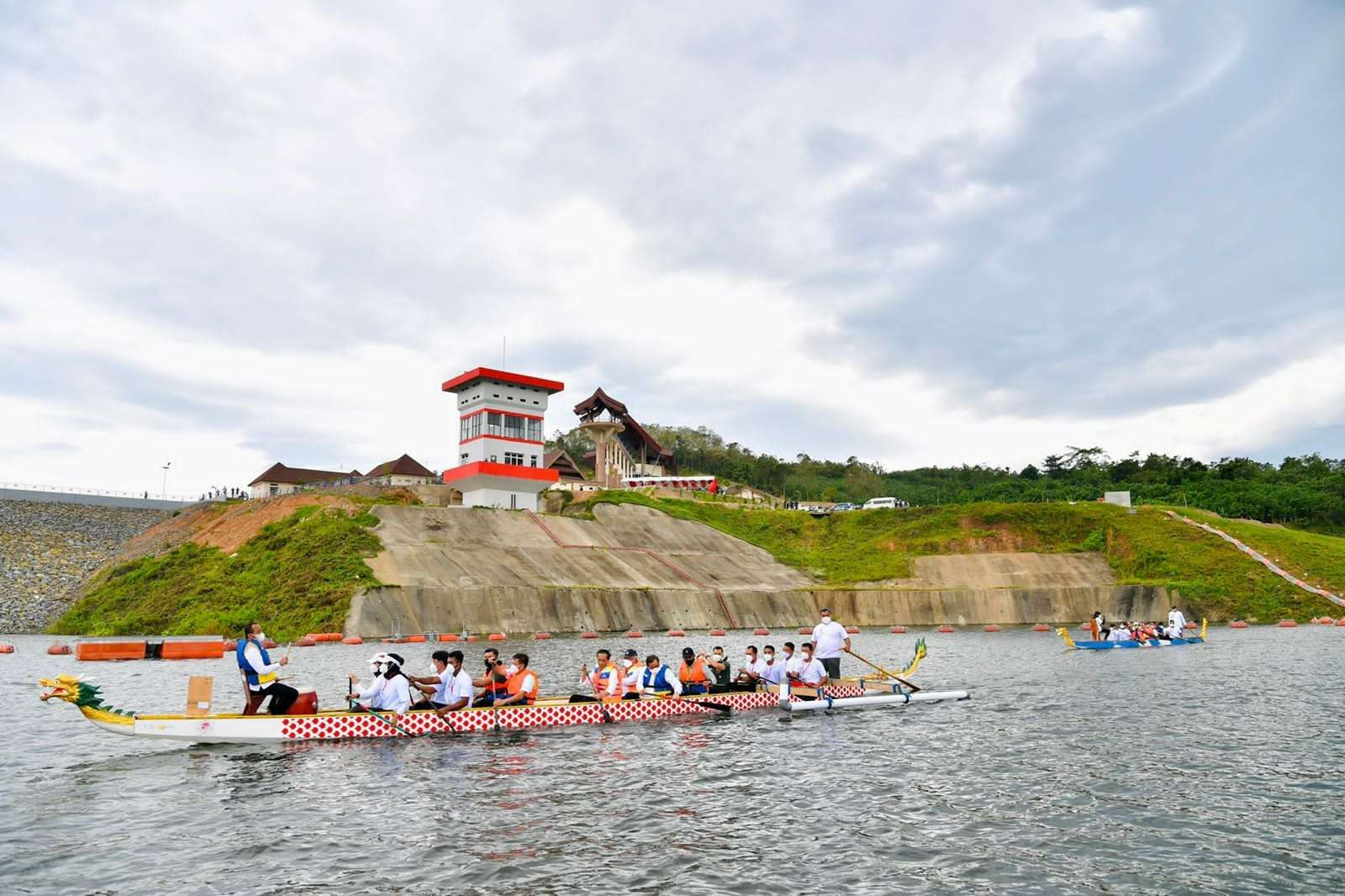
- Ladongi dam

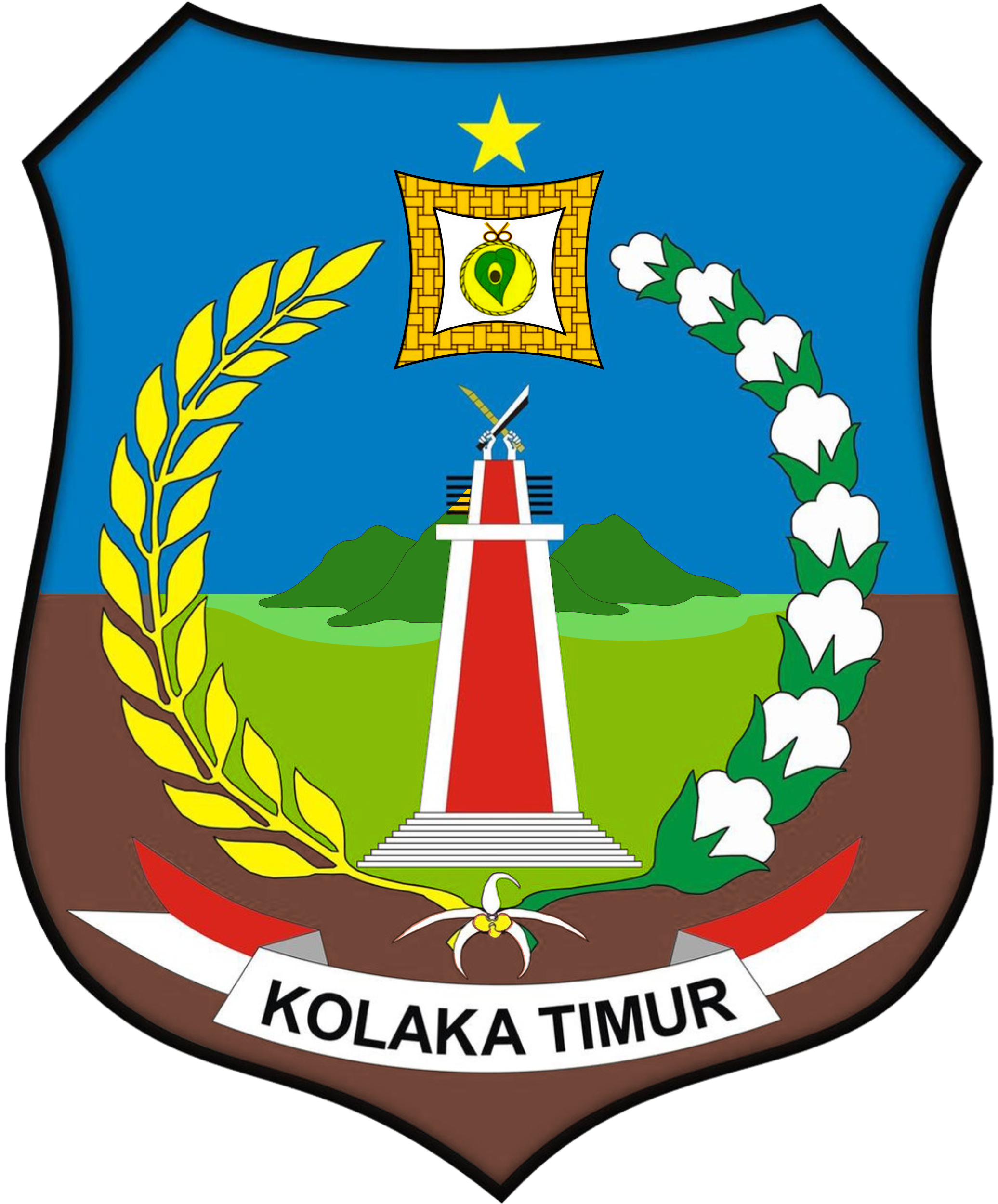
- Coat of arms
- Motto: Inae Konasara Iye Pinesara Inae Liasara Iye Pinekasara; Whoever respects customs will be honored but whoever does not respect customs will not be honored.
- Location within Southeast Sulawesi

- Location in Sulawesi and Indonesia East Kolaka Regency (Indonesia)
- Coordinates: 3°58′46″S 121°54′00″E
- Country: Indonesia
- Province: Southeast Sulawesi
- Capital: Tirawuta

Government
  - Regent (Bupati): Abdul Azis
  - Vice Regent: Yosep Sahaka

Area
  - Total: 3,991.79 km^{2} (1,541.24 sq mi)

Population (mid 2025 estimate)
  - Total: 130,851
  - Density: 32.7800/km^{2} (84.8999/sq mi)
- Time zone: UTC+8 (ICST)
- Postcode: 93573
- Area code: (+62) 405

The East Kolaka Regency is a new and the only landlocked regency of Southeast Sulawesi, Indonesia, established on 11 January 2013 from the former eastern nine districts of the Kolaka Regency. The administrative centre lies at Tirawuta; its current Regent (from 2022) is Abdul Aziz. The area is 3,991.79 km^{2}, and the population at the 2020 census was 120,699; the official estimate as at mid 2025 was 130,851 (comprising 67,390 males and 63,461 females).

== Administration ==
On 14 December 2012, the Indonesian Parliament approved the establishment of a new East Kolaka Regency (Kolaka Timur), to be split off from the existing Kolaka Regency; the new regency - which came into effect on 11 January 2013 under Law No. 8 of 2013 - comprised nine districts of the existing Kolaka Regency; subsequently an additional three districts have been created by splitting existing districts. These are detailed below with their areas and their populations at the 2010 census and the 2020 census, together with the official estimates as at mid 2025. The table also includes the locations of the district administrative centres, the number of administrative villages in each district (totaling 117 rural desa and 16 urban kelurahan), and its post code.

Kode Wilayah	Name of District (kecamatan)	Area in km^{2}	Pop'n census 2010	Pop'n census 2020	Pop'n estimate mid 2025	Admin centre	No. of villages	Post code
74.11.10	Aere	305.39	^{(a)}	8,471	8,941	Aere	11	93573
74.11.05	Lambandia	211.59	27,893	19,555	21,325	Penanggo Jaya	15 ^{(b)}	93578
74.11.04	Poli-Polia	164.77	10,606	10,997	11,956	Poli-Polia	12 ^{(b)}	93579
74.11.12	Dangia	109.73	^{(c)}	8,535	9,190	Gunung Jaya	12	93576
74.11.03	Ladongi	142.34	23,818	18,333	19,094	Atula	10 ^{(d)}	93577
74.11.02	Loea	88.11	6,174	7,242	7,945	Loea	9 ^{(e)}	93581
74.11.01	Tirawuta	276.74	12,483	16,792	19,222	Rate-Rate	16 ^{(e)}	93582
74.11.06	Lalolae	60.21	3,542	4,551	4,950	Lalolae	5 ^{(b)}	93572
74.11.07	Mowewe	129.63	7,538	8,557	9,311	Inebenggi	10 ^{(f)}	93571
74.11.09	Tinondo	348.98	7,119	8,985	9,448	Tinengi	12 ^{(b)}	93570
74.11.08	Uluiwoi	284.58	7,242	5,061	5,242	Sanggona	10 ^{(b)}	93574
74.11.11	Ueesi	1,869.71	^{(g)}	3,620	4,227	Ueesi	11	93575
	Totals	3,991.79	106,415	120,699	130,851	Tirawuta	133	

Notes: (a) the 2010 population of Aere District is included in the figure for Lambandia District, from which it was subsequently split off.
(b) including one kelurahan. (c) the 2010 population of Dangia District is included in the figure for Ladongi District, from which it was subsequently split off.
(d) comprising 4 kelurahan and 6 desa. (e) including 2 kelurahan. (f) including 3 kelurahan.
(g) the 2010 population of Ueesi District is included in the figure for Uluiwoi District, from which it was subsequently split off.
