= Buton Regency =

Regency in Southeast Sulawesi, Indonesia

Buton Regency Kabupaten Buton
- Regency
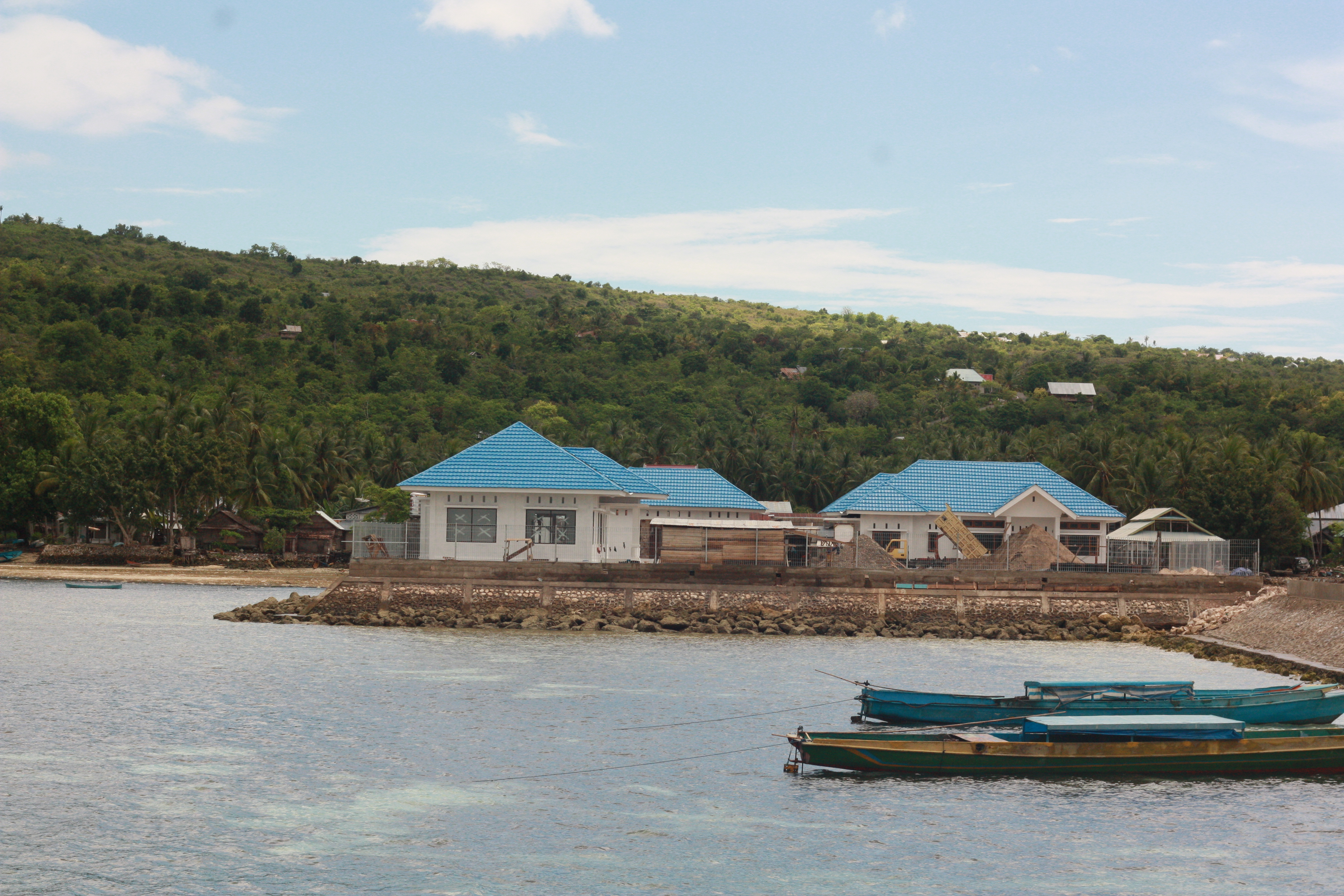
- Tongali, Siompu, Buton Regency

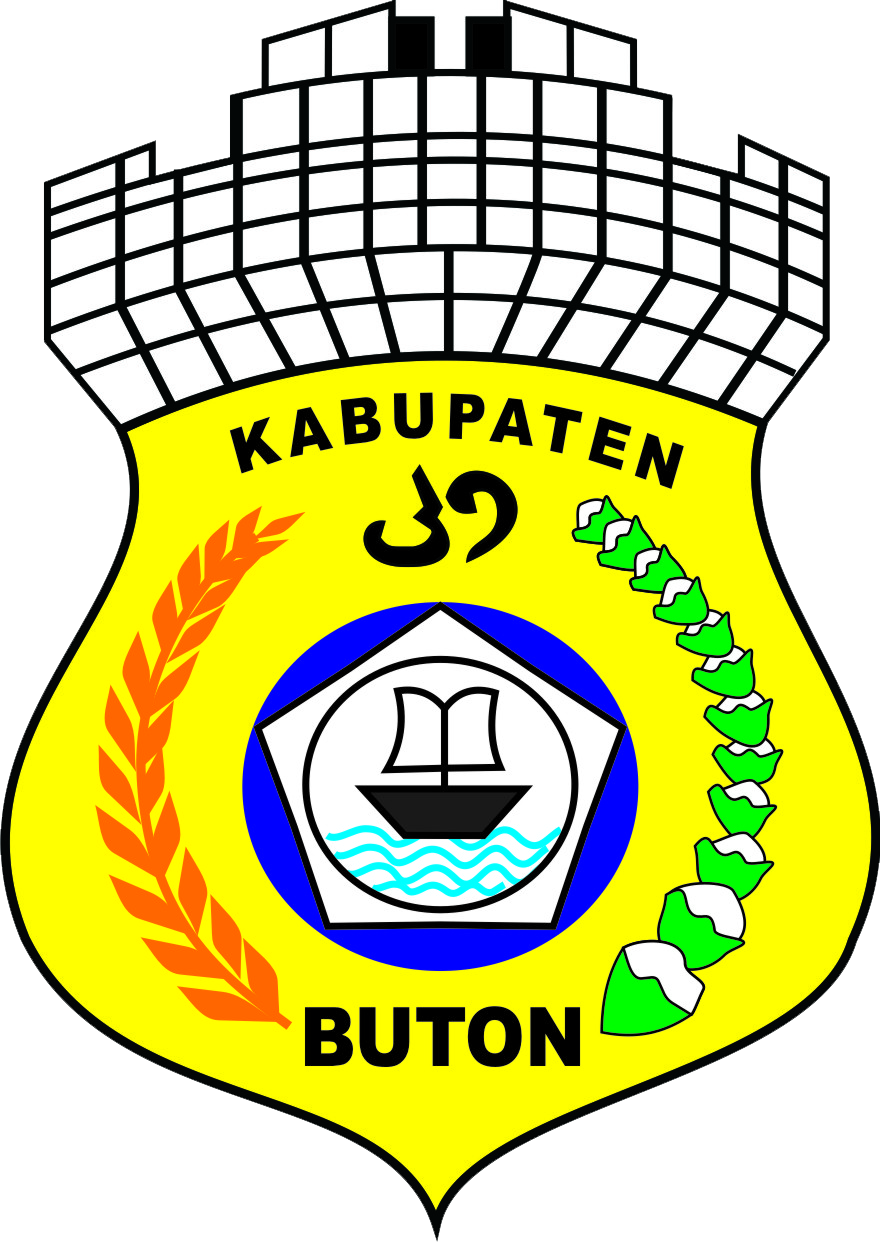
- Coat of arms

- Location within Southeast Sulawesi

- Location in Sulawesi and Indonesia Buton Regency (Indonesia)
- Coordinates: 5°09′31″S 121°55′51″E
- Country: Indonesia
- Province: Southeast Sulawesi
- Capital: Pasarwajo

Government
  - Regent: Alvin Akawijaya Putra
  - Vice Regent: Syarifudin Saafa

Area
  - Total: 1,647.87 km^{2} (636.25 sq mi)

Population (mid 2025 estimate)
  - Total: 122,423
  - Density: 74.2917/km^{2} (192.415/sq mi)
- Time zone: UTC+8 (ICST)
- Area code: (+62) 402
- Website: butonkab.go.id

Buton Regency (Kabupaten Buton) is a regency of Indonesia's Southeast Sulawesi Province, lying entirely on Buton Island. Until 2014 it had an area of 2,681.22 km^{2}, and a population estimated at 276,944 (for January 2014). However, in 2014 it was divided into three regencies, with two new regencies being cut out of it; the residual area now is 1,647.87 km^{2}, and the districts in that area contained a population of 94,388 at the 2010 Census while the 2020 Census produced a total of 115,207; the official estimate as at mid 2025 was 122,423 (comprising 61,028 males and 61,395 females). The capital is nominally at Pasarwajo, but the regency's administration is actually undertaken in the city of Baubau on the south-west of the island, although that city is administratively separate from the Regency.

== Administration ==
The original Buton Regency was formed in 1959 with a much wider area, including most of the island districts in the south of the province, but on 21 June 2001 the town of Bau-Bau was separated out to become an independent city, and on 18 December 2003 two new regencies were formed from parts of Buton Regency - Bombana Regency to the west and Wakatobi Regency to the east. At the time of the 2010 Census, the residual Buton Regency was divided into 21 districts (kecamatan), but in 2012 it was announced that the regency was to be further split, with the southern seven districts split off to form a new Buton Selatan Regency, and seven other districts split off to form a new Buton Tengah Regency (although the latter does not contain any part of Buton Island and is situated entirely on Muna Island and Kabaena Island). This division was made effective on 24 July 2014.

The remaining seven districts are tabulated below with their areas, their populations at the 2010 Census and the 2020 Census, together with the official estimates as at mid 2025. The table also includes the locations of the district administrative centres, the number of villages in each district (totaling 83 rural desa and 12 urban kelurahan), and its post code.

Kode Wilayah	Name of District (kecamatan)	Area in km^{2}	Pop'n Census 2010	Pop'n Census 2020	Pop'n Estimate mid 2025	Admin centre	No. of villages	Post code
74.04.23	Lasalimu ^{(a)}	318.90	10,290	12,395	13,388	Kamaru	15 ^{(b)}	93756
74.04.24	Lasalimu Selatan (South Lasalimu)	147.01	12,815	15,204	16,155	Ambuau Indah	16	93757
74.04.27	Siontapina	248.81	12,167	15,624	16,982	Kumbewaha	11	93758
74.04.11	Pasarwajo	300.13	37,067	44,725	46,589	Pasarwajo	22 ^{(c)}	93752
74.04.28	Wolowa	94.55	4,946	6,188	6,968	Wolowa	7	93754
74.04.29	Wabula	66.11	4,989	6,222	6,842	Wabula	7	93753
74.04.22	Kapontori ^{(d)}	472.36	12,619	14,849	15,499	Watumotobe	17 ^{(e)}	93755
	Totals	1,647.87	94,388	115,207	122,423	Pasarwajo	95	

Notes: (a) includes 6 small offshore islands. (b) including 1 kelurahan (Kamaru).
(c) comprising 9 kelurahan (Awainulu, Kahulungaya, Kambula-Bulana, Kombeli, Pasarwajo, Saragi, Takimpo, Wagola and Wasaga) and 13 desa.
(d) includes 5 small offshore islands. (e) including 2 kelurahan (Wakangka and Watumotobe).

== Climate ==
Buton Regency has a tropical monsoon climate (Köppen Am) with moderate rainfall from July to October and heavy rainfall from November to June. The following climate data is for the town of Pasarwajo, the seat of the regency.

Climate data for Pasarwajo
Month	Jan	Feb	Mar	Apr	May	Jun	Jul	Aug	Sep	Oct	Nov	Dec	Year
Mean daily maximum °C (°F)	30.4 (86.7)	30.2 (86.4)	30.4 (86.7)	30.5 (86.9)	30.2 (86.4)	29.5 (85.1)	29.2 (84.6)	29.7 (85.5)	30.5 (86.9)	31.4 (88.5)	31.6 (88.9)	30.8 (87.4)	30.4 (86.7)
Daily mean °C (°F)	26.6 (79.9)	26.5 (79.7)	26.6 (79.9)	26.6 (79.9)	26.5 (79.7)	25.8 (78.4)	25.3 (77.5)	25.4 (77.7)	25.9 (78.6)	26.6 (79.9)	27.3 (81.1)	26.9 (80.4)	26.3 (79.4)
Mean daily minimum °C (°F)	22.9 (73.2)	22.8 (73.0)	22.8 (73.0)	22.8 (73.0)	22.8 (73.0)	22.2 (72.0)	21.4 (70.5)	21.1 (70.0)	21.3 (70.3)	21.9 (71.4)	23.1 (73.6)	23.1 (73.6)	22.3 (72.2)
Average rainfall mm (inches)	242 (9.5)	217 (8.5)	217 (8.5)	181 (7.1)	217 (8.5)	181 (7.1)	105 (4.1)	43 (1.7)	41 (1.6)	44 (1.7)	133 (5.2)	234 (9.2)	1,855 (72.7)
Source: Climate-Data.org
