= Kabaena =

Island in Southeast Sulawesi, Indonesia

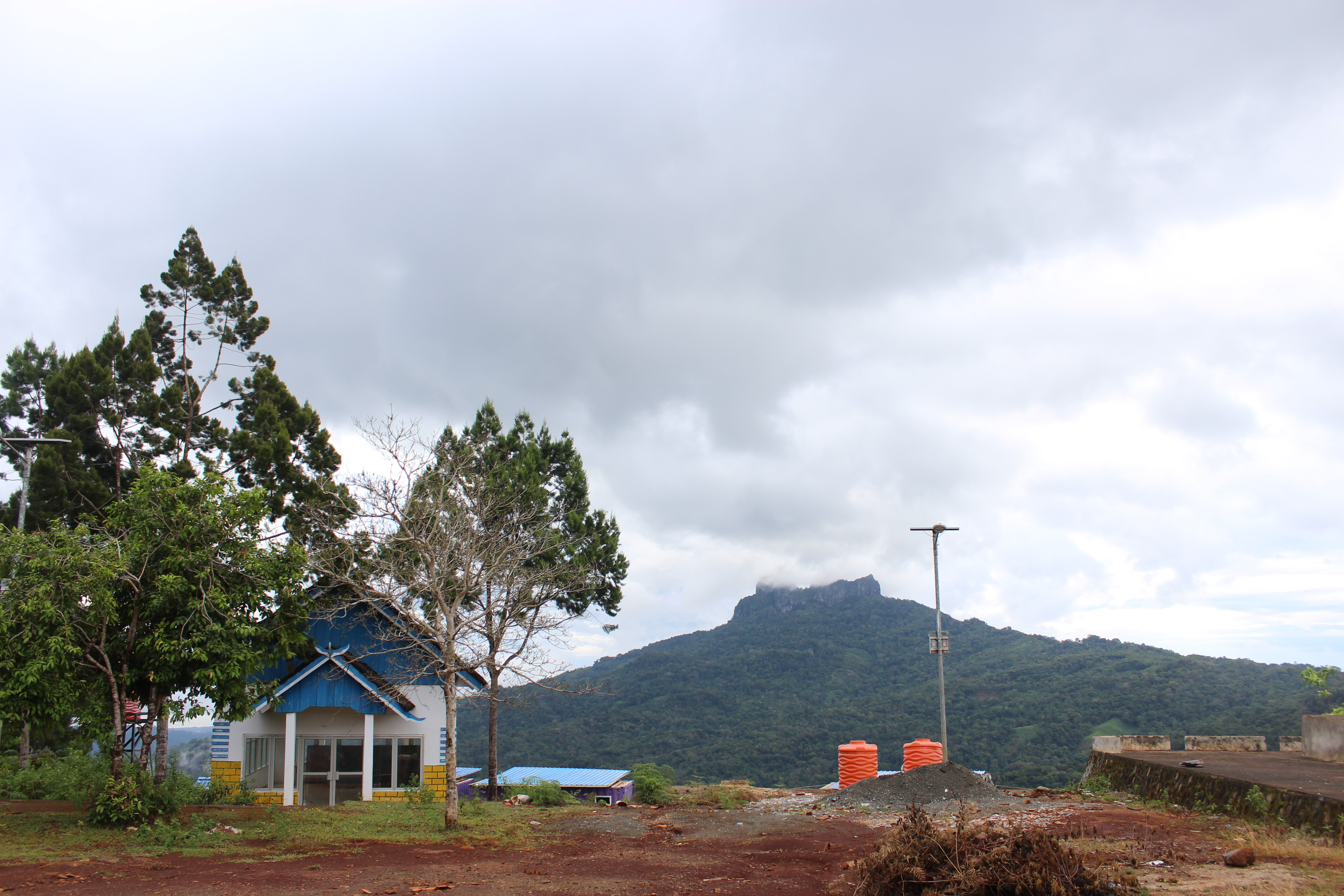
- Watu Sangia Mountain in Kabaena Island

- Location within Sulawesi

Geography
- Location: South East Asia
- Coordinates: 5°15′S 121°55′E
- Area: 894.15 km^{2} (345.23 sq mi)

Administration
- Indonesia
- Province: Southeast Sulawesi

Demographics
- Population: 48,526 (mid 2025 estimate)
- Pop. density: 54.27/km^{2} (140.56/sq mi)

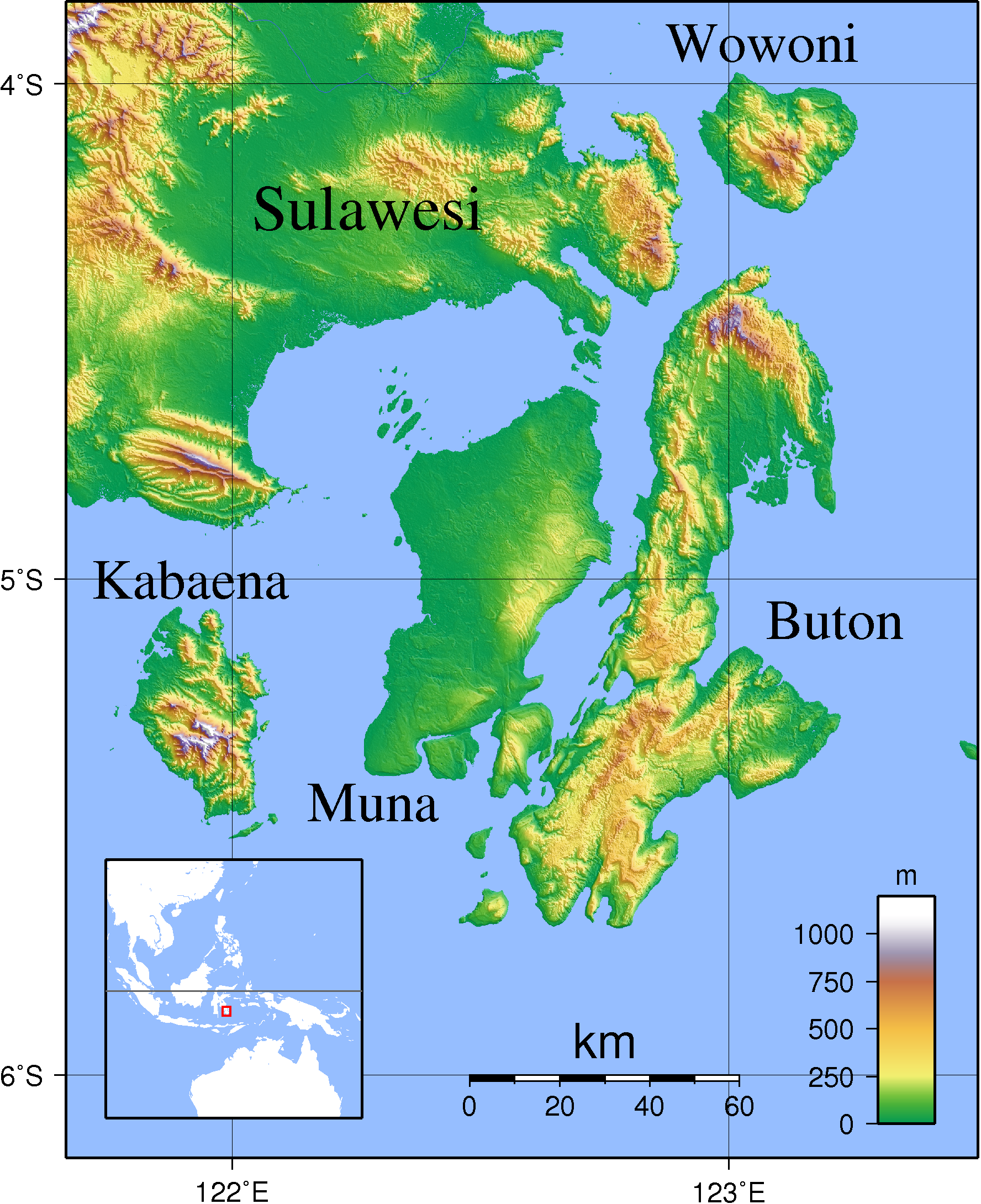
Kabaena and surrounding islands of the Buton Archipelago

Kabaena or Tokotua is an island in the Flores Sea, Indonesia, off the coast of Sulawesi. Most of it is a part of Bombana Regency within Southeast Sulawesi province, although the southernmost district (Talaga Raya) is administratively part of Central Buton Regency. The island's area is 894.15 km^{2} and its total population at the 2010 Census was 35,558 and at the 2020 Census was 42,877; the official estimate as at mid 2025 was 48,526.

== Administrative districts ==
The island includes six of the 22 districts of Bombana Regency, and one district of Central Buton Regency. These seven districts are tabulated below with their areas and their populations at the 2010 Census and the 2020 Census, together with the official estimates as at mid 2025. The table also includes the administrative centre of each district, the number of administrative villages (rural desa and urban kelurahan) and small offshore islands in each district, and its post code.

Name of District (kecamatan)	Area in km^{2}	Pop'n Census 2010	Pop'n Census 2020	Pop'n Estimate mid 2025	Admin centre	No. of villages	No. of islands	Post code
Kabaena Utara (North Kabaena)	125.49	3,671	4,031	4,742	Tedubara	6	4	93785
Kabaena Barat (West Kabaena)	49.81	7,492	7,829	8,774	Baliara	5	7	93780
Kabaena	101.05	2,849	3,120	3,418	Teomokole	4	-	93781
Kabaena Selatan (South Kabaena)	120.04	2,606	3,325	3,695	Batuawu	4	-	93782
Kabaena Tengah (Central Kabaena)	288.61	3,254	4,064	5,228	Lengora	7	-	93783
Kabaena Timur ^{(a)} (East Kabaena)	119.66	6,663	7,566	8,670	Dongkala	7	2	93784
Talaga Raya ^{(b)}	89.49	9,023	12,942	13,999	Talaga Satu	7	5	93766
(Total of Kabaena Island)	894.15	35,558	42,877	48,526		40	18	

Note: (a) Includes the offshore islands of Damalawa Besar and Damalawa Kecil. (b) Talaga Raya District comprises the southern part of Kabaena Island together with two smaller islands off its south-east coast - Talaga Besar (Great Talaga) and Talaga Kecil (Little Talaga); some 70% of the district's population inhabit Talaga Kecil, which contained 9,360 inhabitants (at the mid 2022 estimate) in its area of 3.29 km^{2}.

== Villages ==
The island's 40 villages (rural desa and urban kelurahan) are listed below with their areas and their populations at the 2020 Census. Six of the 40 villages (indicated by asterisks below) have the status of kelurahan, while the other 34 are desa.

Desa or kelurahan	District (kecamatan)	Area in km^{2}	Pop'n 2020 Census
Talaga I *	Talaga Raya	0.35	835
Talaga II	Talaga Raya	0.14	2,248
Liwu Lompona	Talaga Raya	2.68	1,145
Pangilia	Talaga Raya	0.12	1,259
Wulu	Talaga Raya	35.09	630
Talaga Besar	Talaga Raya	21.21	2,371
Kokoe	Talaga Raya	29.75	4,454
Pongkalaero	Kabaena Selatan	65.57	1,071
Puu Nunu	Kabaena Selatan	30.90	705
Batuawu	Kabaena Selatan	25.55	903
Langkemaa	Kabaena Selatan	7.18	646
Tirongkotua *	Kabaena	41.90	628
Rahadopi	Kabaena	34.39	700
Teomokole	Kabaena	11.67	1,080
Rahampuu *	Kabaena	15.61	771
Sikeli *	Kabaena Barat	1.22	3,085
Baliara Selatan	Kabaena Barat	1.20	1,586
Baliara	Kabaena Barat	12.42	1,384
Rahantari	Kabaena Barat	20.24	588
Baliari Kepulauan	Kabaena Barat	4.35	1,186

Desa or kelurahan	District (kecamatan)	Area in km^{2}	Pop'n 2020 Census
Mapila	Kabaena Utara	17.46	721
Wumbulasa	Kabaena Utara	11.55	815
Larolanu	Kabaena Utara	15.33	240
Tedubara	Kabaena Utara	61.13	815
Sangia Makmur	Kabaena Utara	3.83	802
Eemokolo	Kabaena Utara	23.67	638
Lamonggi	Kabaena Tengah	16.67	504
Lengora Selatan	Kabaena Tengah	11.30	534
Lengora	Kabaena Tengah	121.28	575
Lengora Pantai	Kabaena Tengah	26.47	769
Ulungkura	Kabaena Tengah	24.30	757
Enano	Kabaena Tengah	66.32	573
Tangkeno	Kabaena Tengah	9.24	352
Lambale *	Kabaena Timur	20.19	1,612
Dongkala *	Kabaena Timur	43.61	1,754
Tapuhaka	Kabaena Timur	1.98	1,298
Toli-Toli	Kabaena Timur	5.57	773
Balo	Kabaena Timur	6.94	864
Wumbuburo	Kabaena Timur	40.61	776
Bungi-Bungi	Kabaena Timur	2.35	489

Within Talaga Raya District, the kelurahan of Talaga I plus the first three desa (Talaga II, Liwu Lompona and Pangilia) constitute the 3.29 km^{2} area of Talaga Kecil Island with 70% of the district population, while the other three desa (Kokoe, Wulu and Talaga Besar) constitute the 86.07 km^{2} area on Kabaena Island itself and on Talaga Besar Island with 30% of the district population.
