= Southeast Sulawesi =

Province in Sulawesi, Indonesia

Southeast Sulawesi Sulawesi Tenggara
- Province
- Province of Southeast Sulawesi; Provinsi Sulawesi Tenggara
- Coat of arms
- Motto: Inae Konasara Iye Pinesara Inae Liasara Iye Pinekasara (Tolaki) "Whoever respects our traditions, we will respect. but whoever does not respect our traditions we will never respect."
- Southeast Sulawesi in Indonesia
- Interactive map of Southeast Sulawesi
- Coordinates: 3°57′00″S 122°30′00″E
- Country: Indonesia
- Region: Sulawesi (Eastern Indonesia)
- Founded: 27 April 1964
- Capital and largest city: Kendari

Government
  - Body: Southeast Sulawesi Provincial Government
  - Governor: Andi Sumangerukka (Gerindra)
  - Vice Governor: Hugua
  - Legislature: Southeast Sulawesi Regional House of Representatives (DPRD)

Area
  - Total: 36,139.30 km^{2} (13,953.46 sq mi)
  - Rank: 24th in Indonesia
- Highest elevation (Mount Menkongga): 2,650 m (8,694 ft)

Population (mid 2025 estimate)
  - Total: 2,836,740
  - Density: 78.4946/km^{2} (203.300/sq mi)

Demographics
  - Ethnic groups: 36% Tolaki; 26% Butonese (and Buginese); 19% Muna; 10% Moronene; 5.2% Wawonii; 3.5% Chinese; 0.3% others
  - Religion: 96% Islam; 2.3% Christianity; 1.1% Hinduism; 0.4% Buddhism
  - Languages: Indonesian (official); Buginese (lingua franca); Tolaki, Muna–Buton languages (Muna, Cia-Cia, Lasalimu, Kumbewaha, Busoa, Kaimbulawa, Liabuku, Pancana, Kioko, Wakatobi), Maronene, Wawonii, Wolio, Bungku (regional)
- Time zone: UTC+08 (Indonesia Central Time)
- GDP (nominal): 2022
- Total: Rp 158,761 billion (23rd); US$ 10.69 billion US$ 33.36 billion (PPP)
- Per capita: Rp 58.76 million (19th); US$ 3,958; US$ 12,350 (PPP)
- Growth: ▲5.25%
- HDI (2024): ▲0.736 (23rd) – high
- Website: sultraprov.go.id

Southeast Sulawesi (Indonesian: Sulawesi Tenggara, Indonesian pronunciation: [sulaˌwesi t̪əŋˈɡara]; often abbreviated to Sultra, Indonesian pronunciation: [ˈsʊlt̪ra]) is a province on the island of Sulawesi, forming the southeastern peninsula of that island, together with a number of substantial offshore islands such as Buton, Muna, Kabaena, and Wawonii (formerly called Wowoni), together with many smaller islands. It is bordered by South Sulawesi and Central Sulawesi to the north, sharing a maritime border with Maluku and North Maluku to the east and East Nusa Tenggara to the south, as well a very narrow maritime border with East Timor to the south. The capital is the city of Kendari, on the east coast of the peninsula.

The province has no highway road connecting to the rest of the island, and the primary transportation link is a ferry across the Bone Gulf between Watampone (Bone) in South Sulawesi and the port of Kolaka in Southeast Sulawesi.

== History ==
From the seventeenth century until the early twentieth century, the region was the site of the Buton Sultanate (Butung).

== Geography ==
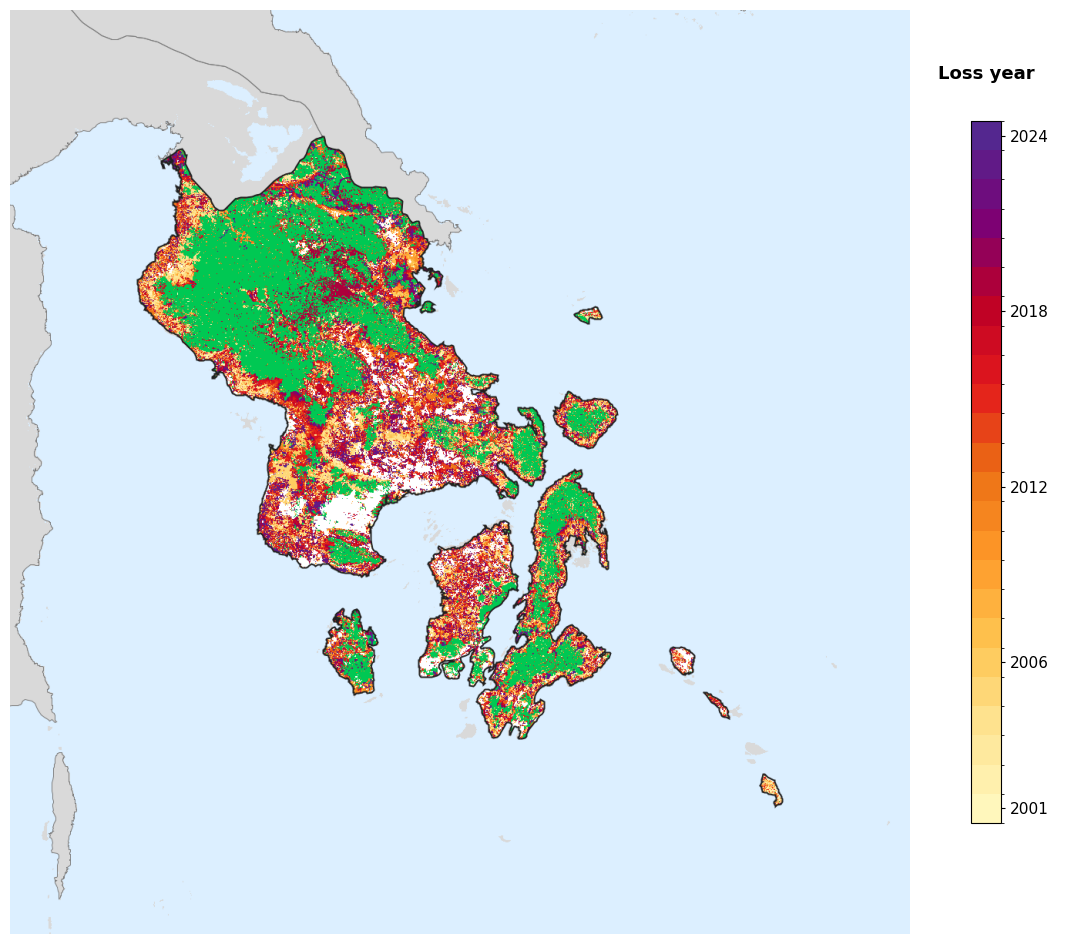
Tree-cover loss year in Southeast Sulawesi, 2001-2024, from the Global Forest Change dataset.

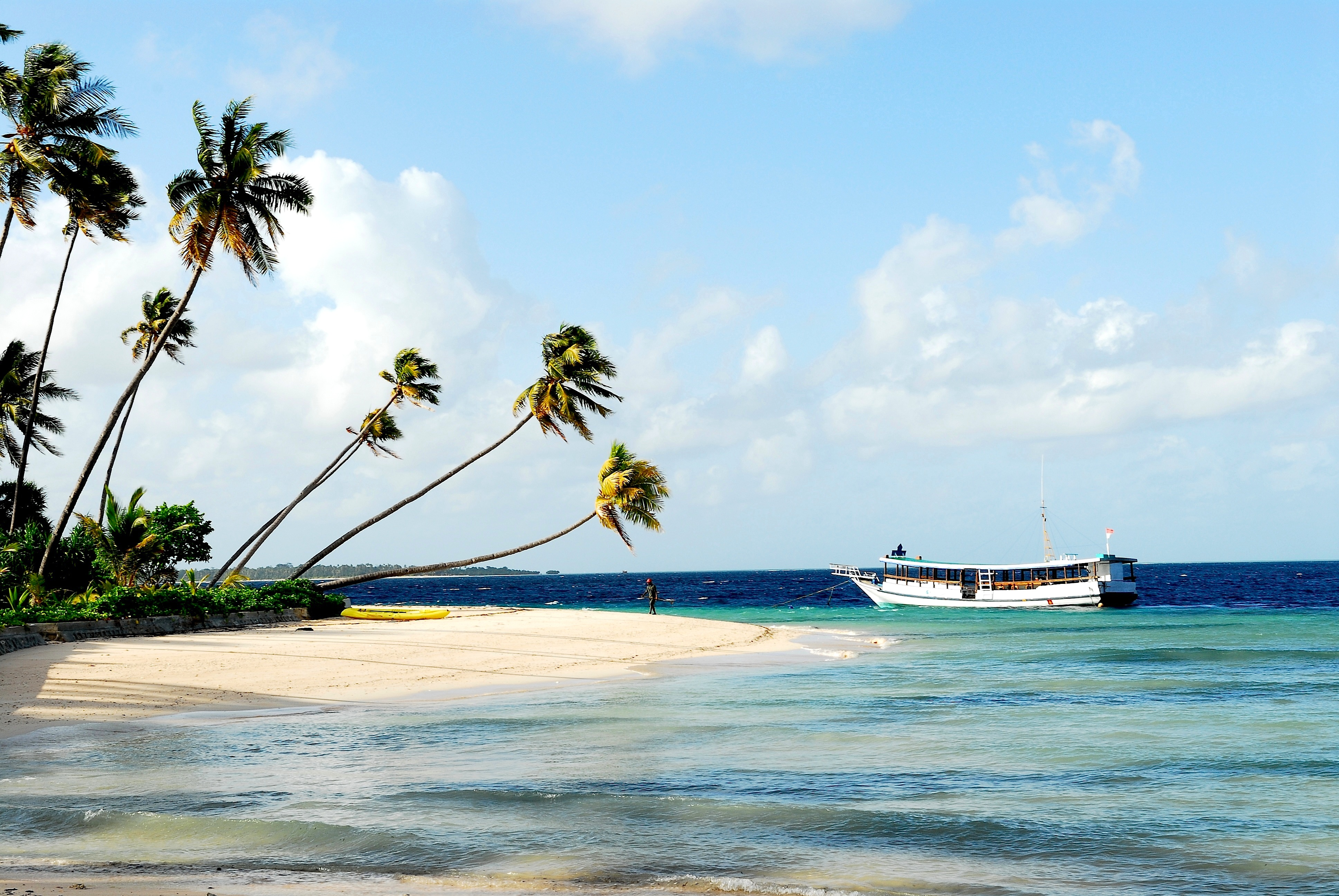
Wakatobi Beach

The two major mountain ranges in Southeast Sulawesi are the Tanggeasinua Range and the Mekongga Range. The major rivers are the Lalinda, the Lasolo, and the Sampara.

== Demographics ==
The population of the province was 2,232,586 at the 2010 decennial census (1,120,225 males, and 1,110,344 females), increasing to 2,624,875 at the 2020 Census. The official estimate as at mid 2025 was 2,836,740. Konawe Selatan, Konawe, Kolaka and Muna are the four most populous regencies.

A third of the population is centered on Buton and Muna islands off the south coast of Sulawesi, and another 15% live in and around Kendari.

Historical population
| Year | Pop. | ±% |
|---|---|---|
| 1971 | 714,120 | — |
| 1980 | 942,302 | +32.0% |
| 1990 | 1,349,619 | +43.2% |
| 1995 | 1,586,917 | +17.6% |
| 2000 | 1,820,379 | +14.7% |
| 2010 | 2,232,586 | +22.6% |
| 2015 | 2,495,248 | +11.8% |
| 2020 | 2,624,875 | +5.2% |
| 2025 | 2,836,740 | +8.1% |
Source: Badan Pusat Statistik 2010 to 2026

=== Religion ===
Religion in Southeast Sulawesi (2022)
1. Islam (95.8%)
2. Hinduism (1.89%)
3. Protestantism (1.66%)
4. Roman Catholic (0.60%)
5. Buddhism (0.05%)

Islam is the predominant religion (96.2%). According to the 2021 estimates, 2,560,000 people were Muslims, 50,780 were Hindus, 44,870 were Protestants, 16,180 were Roman Catholics, 1,610 were Buddhists, 113 were Confusians and 63 adhered to Folk religions.

=== Ethnic groups ===
The ethnic groups in Southeast Sulawesi are Buton (Wolio, Lasalimu, Kumbewaha, Cia-cia), Muna (Busoa, Kaimbulawa, Liabuku, Pancana, Kioko), Wakatobi (Tukangbesi, Bonerate), Tolaki, Culambacu, Kalisusu (Taloki, Koroni), Moronene, Wawonii, and others.

== Government and administrative divisions ==
Southeast Sulawesi Province is divided into fifteen regencies (including the five new regencies established in 2013 and 2014) and two autonomous cities.

As at 1995, there were just four regencies within the province - Buton, Kolaka, Konawe and Muna. On 3 August, the city of Kendari was created from part of Konawe Regency, and on 21 June 2001 the city of Bau-Bau was created from part of Buton Regency.

On 25 February 2003, South Konawe Regency was created from part of Konawe Regency. On 18 December 2003, three new regencies were created - Bombana Regency and Wakatobi Regency from parts of Buton Regency, and North Kolaka Regency from part of Kolaka Regency. On 2 January 2007, two new regencies were created - North Konawe Regency from part of Konawe Regency, and North Buton Regency from part of Muna Regency.

In 2013 the Indonesian Government enacted the creation of 11 new Regencies and Municipalities, including the following in Southeast Sulawesi:

- Konawe Islands Regency, from part of Konawe Regency (enacted by Act No.8 of 2013, on 11 January 2013).
- East Kolaka Regency, from part of Konawe Regency (enacted by Act No.11 of 2013, on 11 May 2013).

Subsequently, on 24 June 2014, the Indonesian Parliament agreed to create three more new regencies, based on consideration of technical, administrative, area, strategic and geopolitic factors:

- South Buton Regency, from part of Buton Regency (enacted by Act No.16 of 2014, on 23 July 2014).
- Central Buton Regency, from part of Buton Regency (enacted by Act No.16 of 2014, on 23 July 2014).
- West Muna Regency, from part of Muna Regency (enacted by Act No.16 of 2014, on 23 July 2014).

These regencies and cities are tabulated below, with their areas and their populations at the 2010 Census and the 2020 Census, together with the official estimates as at mid 2025. The table also includes the location of the regency/city headquarters and their Human Development Index.

| Kode Wilayah | Name of City or Regency | Area (km^{2}) | Population | | | Capital | HDI 2022 |
| Kode Wilayah | Name of City or Regency | Area (km^{2}) | Census 2010 | Census 2020 | Estimate mid 2025 | Capital | HDI 2022 |
|---|---|---|---|---|---|---|---|
| 74.71 | Kendari City | 265.85 | 289,966 | 345,107 | 377,270 | Kendari | 0.845 (Very High) |
| 74.06 | Bombana Regency ^{(a)} | 3,291.92 | 139,235 | 150,706 | 163,160 | Rumbia | 0.668 (Medium) |
| 74.01 | Kolaka Regency | 2,958.87 | 208,817 | 237,587 | 251,540 | Kolaka | 0.739 (High) |
| 74.02 | Konawe Regency | 5,352.92 | 213,038 | 257,011 | 278,550 | Unaaha | 0.720 (High) |
| 74.08 | North Kolaka Regency (Kolaka Utara) | 2,931.68 | 121,340 | 137,659 | 151,360 | Lasusua | 0.704 (High) |
| 74.11 | East Kolaka Regency (Kolaka Timur) | 3,992.53 | 106,415 | 120,699 | 129,310 | Tirawuta | 0.687 (Medium) |
| 74.09 | North Konawe Regency (Konawe Utara) | 4,219.21 | 51,533 | 67,871 | 75,400 | Wanggudu | 0.711 (High) |
| 74.05 | South Konawe Regency (Konawe Selatan) | 4,234.21 | 264,587 | 308,524 | 334,620 | Andoolo | 0.694 (Medium) |
| | Peninsula Regencies | 27,247.20 | 1,394,931 | 1,625,164 | 1,761,210 | | |
| 74.10 | North Buton Regency (Buton Utara) | 1,752.37 | 54,736 | 66,653 | 70,620 | Buranga | 0.690 (Medium) |
| 74.72 | Bau-Bau City | 294.10 | 136,991 | 159,248 | 170,890 | Baubau | 0.766 (High) |
| 74.04 | Buton Regency | 1,664.98 | 94,388 | 115,207 | 123,850 | Pasarwajo | 0.672 (Medium) |
| 74.15 | South Buton Regency (Buton Seletan) | 516.48 | 74,974 | 95,261 | 102,790 | Batauga | 0.654 (Medium) |
| 74.14 | Central Buton Regency ^{(b)} (Buton Tengah) | 835.56 | 86,350 | 114,773 | 123,110 | Labungkari | 0.653 (Medium) |
| 74.03 | Muna Regency ^{(c)} | 1,856.91 | 196,645 | 215,527 | 231,270 | Raha | 0.696 (Medium) |
| 74.13 | West Muna Regency (Muna Barat) | 816.72 | 71,632 | 84,590 | 92,630 | Laworo | 0.662 (Medium) |
| 74.12 | Konawe Islands Regency ^{(d)} (Konawe Kepulauan) | 704.18 | 28,944 | 37,050 | 40,350 | Langara | 0.667 (Medium) |
| 74.07 | Wakatobi Regency | 450.80 | 92,995 | 111,402 | 120,040 | Wanci (on Wangi-wangi; Island) | 0.708 (High) |
| | Island Regencies | 8,892.10 | 837,655 | 999,711 | 1,075,530 | | |

Notes

(a) Bombana Regency is mainly peninsula (the areas around Poleang and Rumbia on Sulawesi Island) but partly insular (including most of Kabaena Island).
(b) The Central Buton Regency comprises the southern part of Muna Island and a small southern part of Kabaena Island, but does not include any part of Buton Island.
(c) Under discussion by the Indonesian government in 2013 was a proposal to create an additional municipality of Raha, on Muna Island, but any such proposal is in abeyance and this potential extra municipality is not separated in the table above.
(d) The Konawe Islands Regency comprises Wawonii Island and small offshore islets around it.

The province now forms one of Indonesia's 84 national electoral districts to elect members to the People's Representative Council. The Southeast Sulawesi Electoral District consists of all of the 15 regencies in the province, together with the cities of Kendari and Bau-Bau, and elects 6 members to the People's Representative Council.

== Transportation ==
=== Airports ===
- Betoambari Airport, Baubau
- Haluoleo Airport, South Konawe
- Matahora Airport, Wakatobi
- Sangia Nibandera Airport, Kolaka
- Sugimanuru Airport, West Muna
- Tomia Airport, Wakatobi

=== Ports ===
- Antam Pomalaa, Kolaka
- Bungkutoko, Kendari
- Ferry (ASDP), Kolaka
- Ferry Batulo, Baubau
- Ferry Lagasa, Muna
- Ferry Pure, Muna
- Ferry Tampo, Muna
- Ferry Tondasi, West Muna
- Ferry Wamengkoli, Central Buton
- Liana Banggai, Central Buton
- Maligano, Muna
- Murhum, Baubau
- Nusantara, Kendari
- Nusantara Raha, Muna
- Pangulu Belo, Wakatobi
- Samudra, Kolaka
- Simpu, South Buton
- Transito Talaga Raya, Central Buton

== See also ==
- Wakatobi National Park
