= Konawe Islands Regency =

Regency in Southeast Sulawesi, Indonesia

Konawe Islands Regency Kabupaten Konawe Kepulauan
- Regency
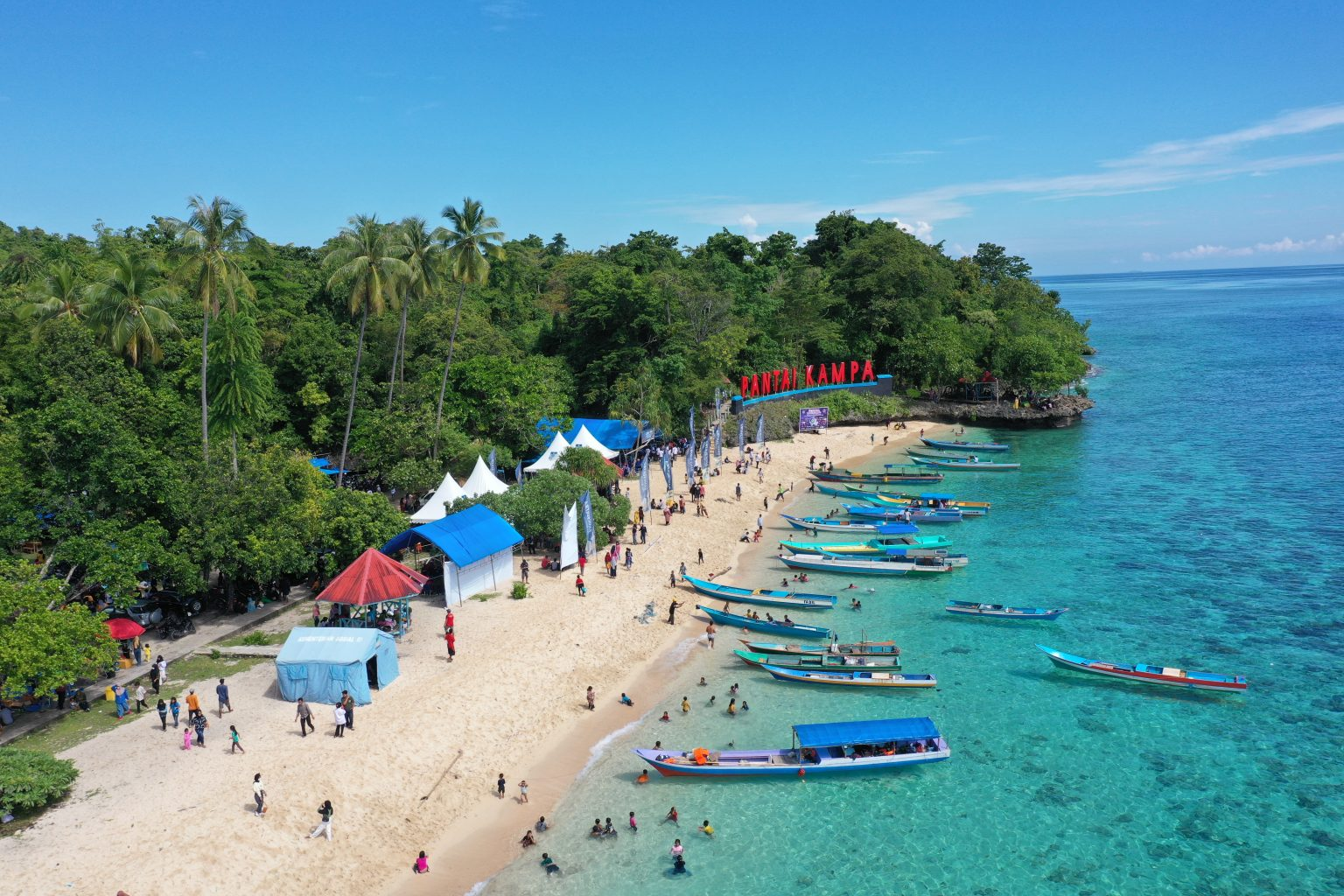
- Kampa beach in Wawonii

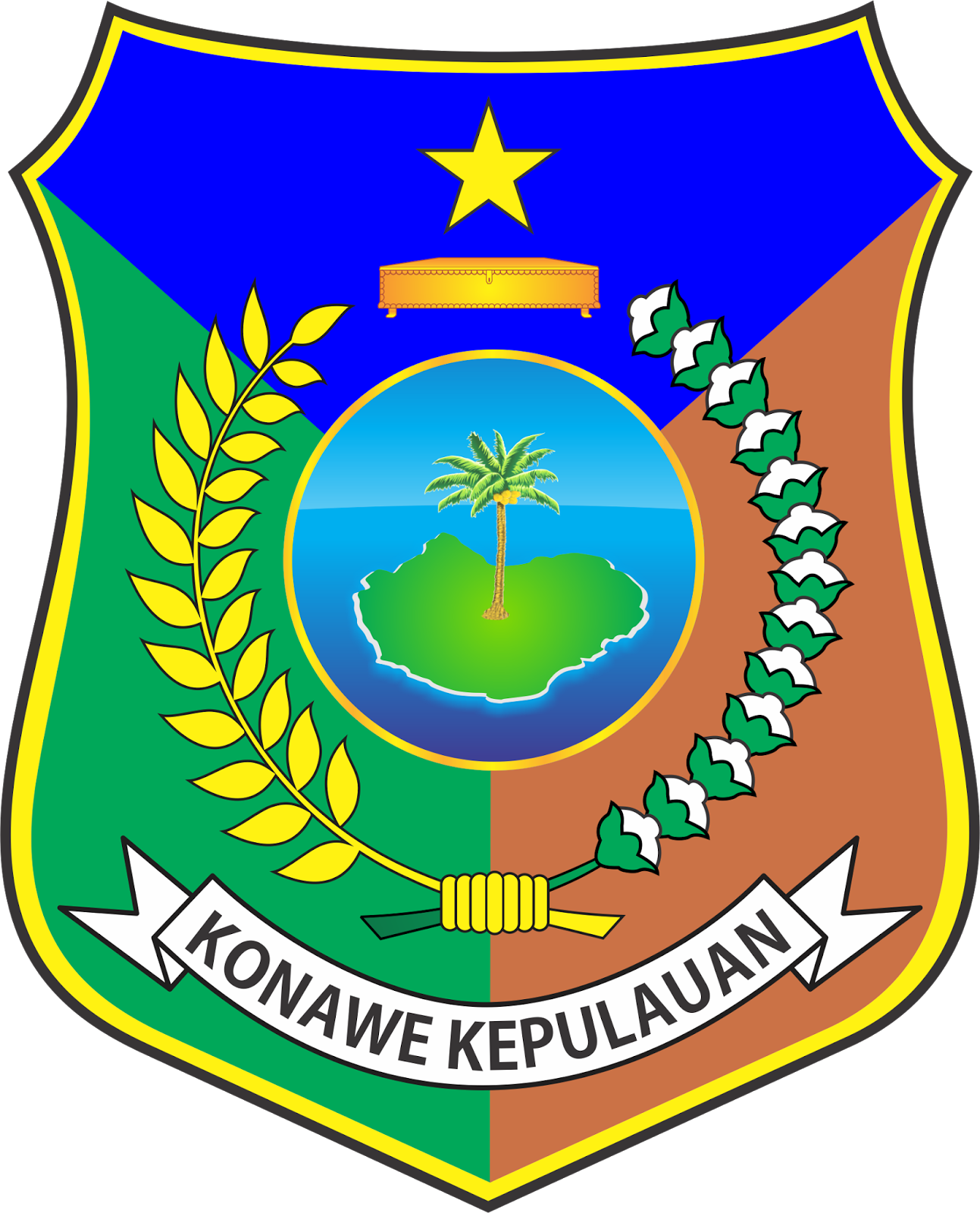
- Coat of arms

- Location within Southeast Sulawesi

- Location in Sulawesi and Indonesia Konawe Islands Regency (Indonesia)
- Coordinates: 4°08′52″S 123°03′55″E
- Country: Indonesia
- Province: Southeast Sulawesi
- Capital: Langara

Government
  - Regent: Rifqi Saifullah Razak
  - Vice Regent: Muhamad Farid

Area
  - Total: 867.58 km^{2} (334.97 sq mi)

Population (mid 2025 official estimate)
  - Total: 44,423
  - Density: 51.203/km^{2} (132.62/sq mi)
- Time zone: UTC+8 (ICST)
- Area code: (+62) 401
- Website: konkepkab.go.id

Konawe Islands Regency is an insular regency in the province of Southeast Sulawesi, Indonesia, established on 15 May 2013 from that former insular part of Konawe Regency which consisted of the seven districts comprising Wawonii Island (together with a few minor offshore islets). It covers an area of 867.58 km^{2}, and had a population of 28,944 at the 2010 Census and 37,050 at the 2020 Census; the official estimate as at mid 2025 was 44,423 (comprising 22,471 males and 21,952 females). The administrative centre lies at the town of Langara, a port of the northwest corner of the island.

== Administration ==
Konawe Islands Regency, which is coincident with Wawonii Island, is divided into seven districts (kecamatan), tabulated below with their areas and their populations at the 2010 Census and 2020 Census, together with the official estimates as at mid 2025.

The table also includes the locations of the district administrative centres, the number of villages in each district (comprising 89 rural desa and 7 urban kelurahan - the latter being the district administrative centre in each of the districts except in Wawonii Barat District, where the kelurahan is Langara Laut which had 990 inhabitants in mid 2023, rather than neighbouring Langara Iwawo which had 892 inhabitants), and its post code.

Kode Wilayah	Name of District (kecamatan)	Area in km^{2}	Pop'n Census 2010	Pop'n Census 2020	Pop'n Estimate mid 2025	Admin centre	No. of villages	Post code
74.12.05	Wawonii Tenggara (Southeast Wawonii)	147.00	5,304	6,972	8,447	Polara	15	93394
74.12.04	Wawonii Timur (East Wawonii)	119.83	2,814	3,425	3,996	Munse	11	93396
74.12.03	Wawonii Timur Laut (Northeast Wawonii)	90.58	3,083	3,588	4,128	Ladianta	10	93397
74.12.02	Wawonii Utara (North Wawonii)	137.70	5,067	6,168	7,100	Lansilowo	21	93398
74.12.06	Wawonii Selatan (South Wawonii)	137.45	3,276	4,308	4,986	Sawaea	11	93392
74.12.07	Wawonii Tengah (Central Wawonii)	142.39	2,990	3,843	4,771	Lampeapi	12	93393
74.12.01	Wawonii Barat (West Wawonii)	92.63	6,410	8,746	10,995	Langara Iwawo	16	93391
	Totals	867.58	28,944	37,050	44,423	Langara	96	
