= Central Buton Regency =

Regency in Southeast Sulawesi, Indonesia

Central Buton Regency Kabupaten Buton Tengah
- Regency
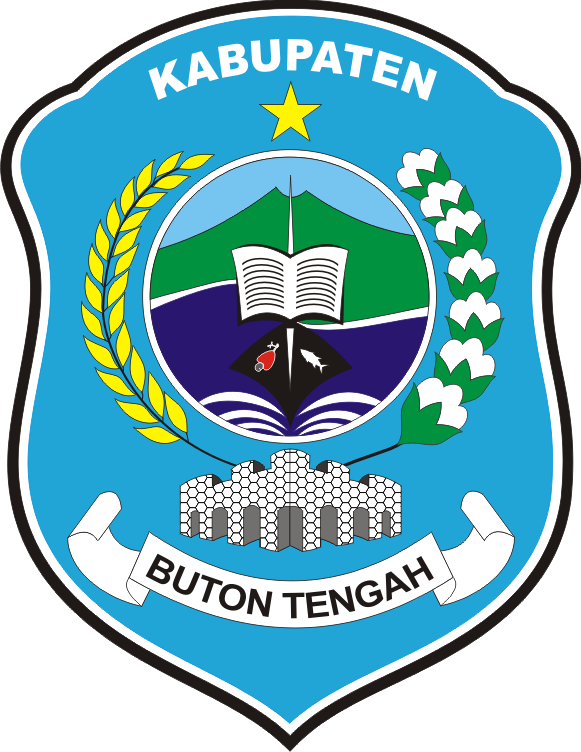
- Coat of arms

- Location within Southeast Sulawesi

- Location in Sulawesi and Indonesia Central Buton Regency (Indonesia)
- Coordinates: 5.311493°S 122.456664°E
- Country: Indonesia
- Province: Southeast Sulawesi
- Established: 24 July 2014; 12 years ago
- Founder: Government of Indonesia
- Capital: Labungkari

Government
  - Regent: Azhari
  - Vice Regent: Muhammad Adam Basan

Area
  - Total: 837.16 km^{2} (323.23 sq mi)

Population (mid 2025 estimate)
  - Total: 123,759
  - Density: 147.83/km^{2} (382.88/sq mi)
- Time zone: UTC+8 (ICST)
- Area code: (+62) 402
- Website: butontengahkab.go.id

Central Buton Regency (Indonesian: Kabupaten Buton Tengah) is a regency of Southeast Sulawesi established by separation of Buton Regency in July 2014. It covers an area of 837.16 km^{2} comprising the southern parts of Muna Island and Kabaena Island, together with several small offshore islands adjacent to these two main islands, but with no territory located on Buton Island (the title is thus a misnomer). It had a population of 86,112 at the 2010 Census and 114,773 at the 2020 Census; the official estimate as at mid 2025 was 123,759 (comprising 60,480 males and 63,279 females). The administrative centre lies at Labungkari in Lakudo District.

== Administrative districts ==
The Central Buton Regency is divided into seven districts (kecamatan), tabulated below with their areas and 2010 and 2020 Census populations, together with the official estimates as at mid 2025. The table also includes the location of the administrative centre of each district, the number of administrative villages in each district (totaling 67 rural desa and 10 urban kelurahan), the number of small offshore islands in each district, and its post code.

Kode Wilayah	Name of District (kecamatan)	Area in km^{2}	Pop'n Census 2010	Pop'n Census 2020	Pop'n Estimate mid 2025	Admin centre	No. of villages	No. of islands	Post code
74.14.04	Mawasangka	229.02	22,054	28,985	32,728	Mawasangka	19 ^{(a)}	1	93762
74.14.03	Mawasangka Tengah (Central Mawasangka)	121.99	9,147	12,717	14,879	Lanto	10 ^{(b)}	6	93764
74.14.02	Mawasangka Timur (East Mawasangka)	93.35	4,839	6,130	6,709	Lasori	8	6	93765
74.14.01	Lakudo	204.30	20,210	26,556	27,898	Lakudo	15 ^{(c)}	3	93763
74.14.06	Gu	93.10	15,836	21,540	21,656	Watulea	12 ^{(d)}	-	93761
74.14.07	Sangia Wambulu	5.91	5,003	5,903	5,894	Tolandona	6 ^{(e)}	-	93760
74.14.05	Talaga Raya ^{(f)}	89.49	9,023	12,942	13,995	Talaga Satu	7 ^{(g)}	5	93766
	Totals	837.16	86,112	114,773	123,759		77	21	

The new Regency thus comprises six districts in the southern part of Muna Island together with one district (Talaga Raya) in the southern part of Kabaena Island. It notably does not contain any portion of Buton Island.

Note: (a) includes 2 kelurahan (Mawasangka and Watolo). (b) includes one kelurahan (Lakorua).
(c) includes 3 kelurahan (Boneoge, Gu Timur and Lakudo). (d) includes 2 kelurahan (Bombonawulu and Watulea).
(e) includes one kelurahan (Tolandona). (f) Talaga Raya District comprises the southern part of Kabaena Island together with two smaller islands off its south-east coast - Talaga Besar (Great Talaga) and Talaga Kecil (Little Talaga); over 60% of the district's population inhabit Talaga Kecil, which contained 7,836 inhabitants (at the 2020 Census) in its area of 3.29 km^{2}. (g) includes one kelurahan (Talaga I).
