= Muna Regency =

Regency in Southeast Sulawesi, Indonesia

Muna Regency Kabupaten Muna
- Regency
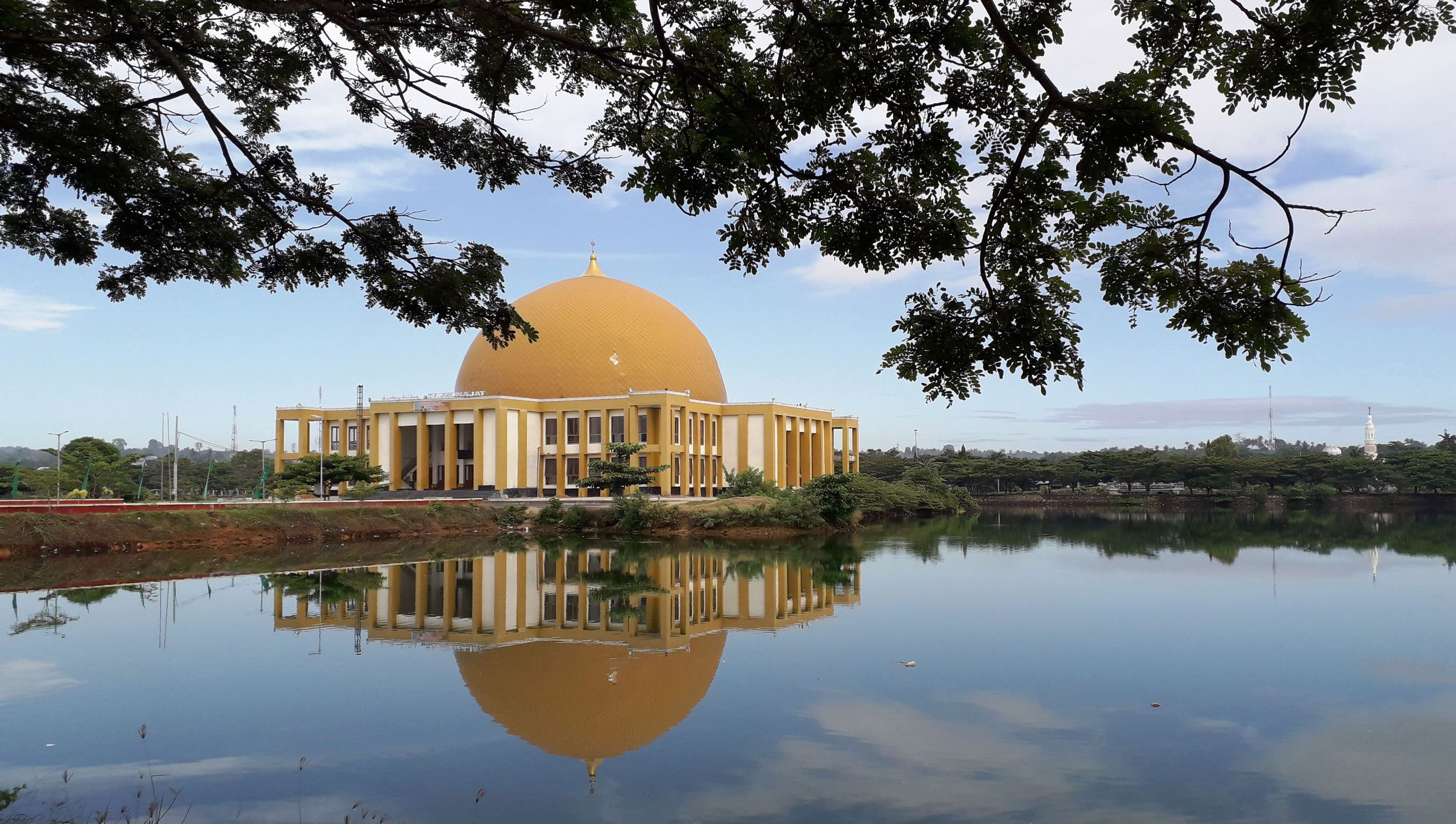
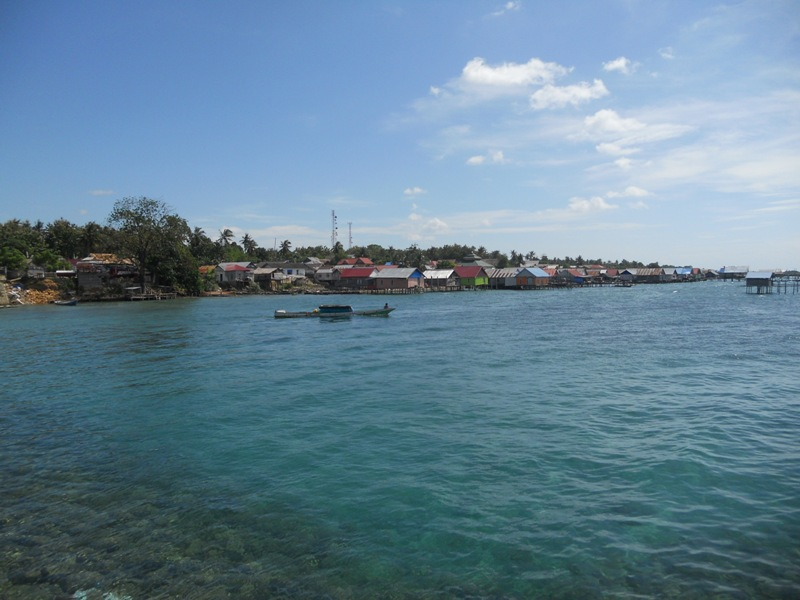
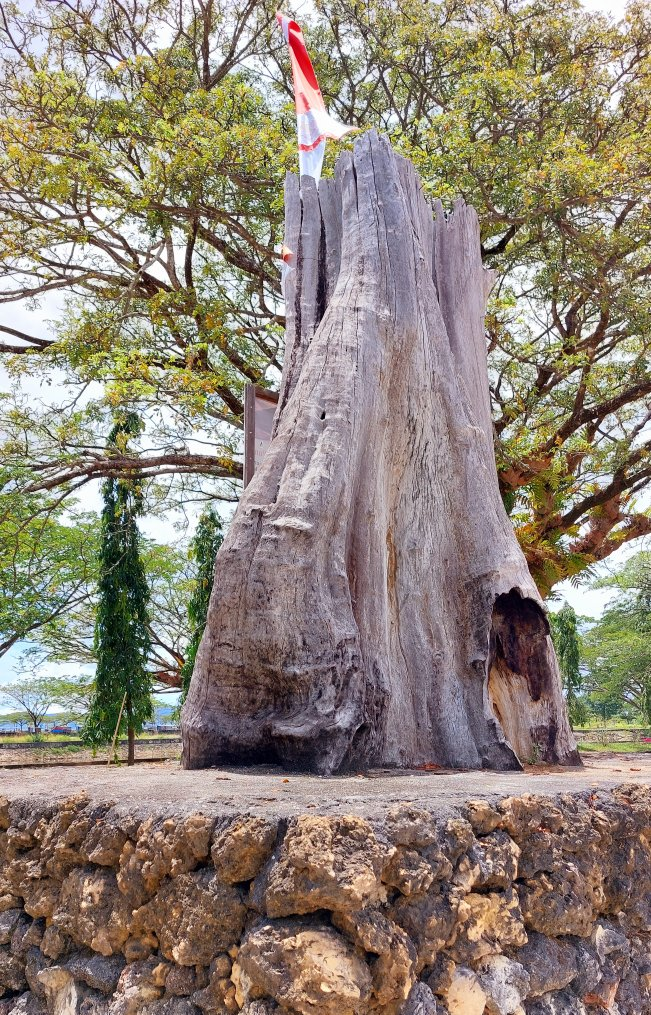
- Top to bottom, left to right; Al Munajat Mosque in Town of Raha; Coastal view from Tampo village; teak wood in Museum Bharugano Wuna

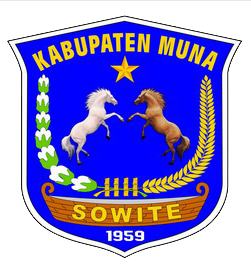
- Coat of arms
- Motto: Sowite (Muna) (For the sake of my land)
- Location within Southeast Sulawesi

- Location in Sulawesi and Indonesia Muna Regency (Indonesia)
- Coordinates: 4°50′33″S 122°38′53″E
- Country: Indonesia
- Province: Southeast Sulawesi
- Capital: Raha

Government
  - Regent: Bachrun Labuta
  - Vice Regent: La Ode Asrafil

Area
  - Total: 2,057.69 km^{2} (794.48 sq mi)

Population (mid 2024 Estimate)
  - Total: 231,980
  - Density: 112.74/km^{2} (291.99/sq mi)
- Time zone: UTC+8 (ICST)
- Area code: (+62) 403
- Website: munakab.go.id

Muna Regency (Kabupaten Muna) is a regency of Southeast Sulawesi Province of Indonesia, covering parts of the island of Muna as well as part of the neighbouring Buton Island and smaller islands off its coast. Until 2014 it had an area of 2,945.05 km^{2}, but in that year the western eleven districts of that Regency were split off to form a new West Muna Regency. The reduced regency now covers an area of 2,057.69 km^{2}, and the districts comprising that area had a population of 196,645 at the 2010 Census; the total at the 2020 Census was 215,527, and the official estimate as at mid 2024 was 231,980 (comprising 112,327 males and 115,657 females in mid 2023). The principal town lies at Raha, in Katobu District.

== Administration ==
The Muna Regency was divided until 2014 into 33 districts (kecamatan), but following the separation of the eleven districts in the west of the island, the remaining twenty-two districts are tabulated below with their areas and their populations at the 2010 Census and the 2020 Census, together with the official estimates as at mid 2024. Eight of the districts lie in the centre of the island, nine lie on its northeast coast (or on islands to the north of that coast) and five lie across the strait on the northwest coast of Buton Island. The table also includes the locations of the district administrative centres, the number of villages within each district (totaling 124 rural desa and 26 urban kelurahan), and its postal code. The capital, Raha, lies in Katobu District, in which all 8 component villages are rated as kelurahan, but its urban area encompasses adjacent districts.

Kode Wilayah	Name of District (kecamatan)	Area in km^{2}	Pop'n Census 2010	Pop'n Census 2020	Pop'n Estimate mid 2024	Admin centre	No. of Villages	Post Code
74.03.27	Tongkuno ^{(a)}	440.98	14,380	15,719	17,633	Wakuru	12 ^{(a)}	93662
74.03.32	Tongkuno Selatan (South Tongkuno)	57.26	5,264	6,267	6,572	Lawama	6 ^{(b)}	93665
74.03.25	Parigi	123.76	10,904	12,272	13,424	Wasolangka	11 ^{(c)}	93667
74.03.26	Bone (Bone Tondo)	130.09	5,133	5,739	6,611	Bonekancitala	5	93663
74.03.31	Marobo	41.37	6,116	6,491	7,262	Marobo	5	93666
74.03.24	Kabawo	204.94	12,172	12,991	14,426	Lasehao	11 ^{(d)}	93661
74.03.23	Kabangka	97.62	9,148	10,007	10,582	Oensuli	9	93664
74.03.30	Kontu Kuwuna	70.56	3,736	4,331	4,801	Bahutara	6	93660
	Central Muna totals	1,166.58	66,853	73,817	81,311		65	
74.03.20	Kontunaga	50.88	7,619	8,457	9,169	Liabalano	7	93625
74.03.19	Watopute	100.12	11,684	13,122	14,070	Wali	8 ^{(e)}	93624
74.03.16	Katobu	12.88	28,360	26,896	26,754	Raha	8 ^{(f)}	93611 -93616
74.03.18	Lohia ^{(g)}	49.81	13,282	14,825	16,129	Lohia	9	93626
74.03.17	Duruka ^{(h)}	11.52	11,207	12,633	13,742	Wapunto	7 ^{(i)}	93618
74.03.15	Batalaiworu	22.71	12,640	15,240	15,122	Laiworu	4 ^{(j)}	93614
74.03.06	Napabalano ^{(k)}	105.47	10,785	11,723	12,601	Tampo	6 ^{(l)}	93622
74.03.14	Lasalepa	107.92	10,005	11,204	12,170	Bonea	7	93621
74.03.37	Towea ^{(m)}	29.02	4,722	5,076	5,359	Moasi	5	93623
	Northeast Muna totals	490.33	110,304	119,176	125,116		61	
74.03.28	Pasir Putih ^{(n)}	89.53	4,071	4,591	5,283	Pola	6	93685
74.03.33	Pasi Kolaga ^{(n)}	48.77	3,856	4,203	4,907	Lambelu	4	93684
74.03.13	Wakorumba Selatan ^{(n)} (South Wakorumba)	95.00	4,209	4,618	5,095	Pure	5 ^{(o)}	93681
74.03.34	Batukara ^{(n)}	69.39	2,244	2,667	2,995	Lanobake	4	93682
74.03.07	Maligano ^{(n)}	98.09	5,108	6,455	7,273	Maligano	6	93683
	Northwest Buton totals ^{(n)}	400.78	19,488	22,534	25,553		25	

Notes:

- (a) Tongkuno District includes 43 small islands. It is subdivided into 3 kelurahan (Danagoa, Kontumolepe and Tombula) and 9 desa.
- (b) includes one kelurahan (Katumpu). (c) comprises 4 kelurahan (Kosundano, Wakumoro, Walambeno Wite and Wasolangka) and 7 desa.
- (d) including one kelurahan - Laimpi. (e) includes 2 kelurahan (Wali and Dana).
- (f) all eight are kelurahan (Butung Butung, Foo Kuni, Laende, Raha I, Raha II, Raha III, Wamponiki and Watonea).
- (g) Lohia District includes 87 small islands. (h) Duruka District includes 4 small islands.
- (i) includes 2 kelurahan (Palangga and Wapunto). (j) includes 2 kelurahan (Laiworu and Sidodadi).
- (k) Napabalano District includes 6 small islands. (l) includes 2 kelurahan (Tampo and Napabalano).
- (m) Towea is a group of islands off the north coast of Muna.
- (n) the five last-named above lie on the northwest coast of Buton Island, not on Muna Island. Pasir Putih District includes 3 small islands and Wakorumba Seletan District includes 2 small islands. (o) includes one kelurahan (Labunia).
