= List of bridges in Indonesia =

== Historical and architectural interest bridges ==
	Name	Distinction	Length	Type	Carries Crosses	Opened	Location	Province	Ref.
1	Kota Intan Bridge			Bascule bridge	Footbridge; Kali Besar	1628	Jakarta; Kota Tua Jakarta; 6°07′52.5″N 106°48′38.0″E	Jakarta	
2	Ampera Bridge		1,177 m (3,862 ft)	Beam bridge Steel; Vertical-lift bridge	Road bridge Musi River	1965	Palembang; 2°59′30.4″S 104°45′48.5″E	South Sumatra	

== Major road and railway bridges ==
This table presents the structures with spans greater than 100 meters (non-exhaustive list).

	Name	Span	Length	Type	Carries Crosses	Opened	Location	Province	Ref.
1	Suramadu Bridge	434 m (1,424 ft)	5,438 m (17,841 ft)	Cable-stayed; Composite steel/concrete box girder deck, concrete pylons 192+434+192	Road bridge Madura Strait	2009	Surabaya (Java)- Bangkalan (Madura Island); 7°11′08.8″S 112°46′48.6″E	East Java	
2	Balang Island Bridge under construction	402 m (1,319 ft)	1,750 m (5,740 ft)	Cable-stayed; Concrete beam deck, concrete pylons	Road bridge Balikpapan Bay		Balikpapan; 1°06′36.4″S 116°43′49.5″E	East Kalimantan	
3	Achmad Amins Bridge	370 m (1,210 ft)	1,428 m (4,685 ft)	Cable-stayed; Concrete beam deck, concrete pylons	Road bridge Jalan Kapten Soedjono; Mahakam River	2017	Samarinda; 0°32′02.0″S 117°09′26.7″E	East Kalimantan	
4	Tengku Fisabilillah Bridge	350 m (1,150 ft)	644 m (2,113 ft)	Cable-stayed; Concrete beam deck, concrete pylons	Road bridge Jalan Trans Barelang; South China Sea	1997	Batam - Tonton Island (Riau Archipelago); 0°58′54.1″N 104°02′29.4″E	Riau Islands	
5	Aji Tulur Jejangkat Bridge under construction	340 m (1,120 ft)	1,040 m (3,410 ft)	Cable-stayed; Concrete beam deck, concrete pylons	Road bridge Mahakam River		Melak; 0°13′56.3″S 115°50′20.3″E	East Kalimantan	
6	Kutai Kartanegara Bridge (2001) collapsed in 2011	270 m (890 ft)	710 m (2,330 ft)	Suspension; Steel truss deck, steel pylons 100+270+100	Road bridge Mahakam River	2001	Tenggarong - Samarinda; 0°26′39.7″S 117°00′10.7″E	East Kalimantan	
7	Kutai Kartanegara Bridge (2015)	270 m (890 ft)	710 m (2,330 ft)	Arch; Steel through arch 100+270+100	Road bridge Mahakam River	2015	Tenggarong - Samarinda; 0°26′39.3″S 117°00′10.1″E	East Kalimantan	
8	Teluk Mesjid Bridge	250 m (820 ft)	1,650 m (5,410 ft)	Arch; Steel through arch 90+250+90	Road bridge Siak River	2012	Teluk Mesjid; 1°03′23.8″N 102°07′23.0″E	Riau	
9	Tuanku Tambusai Bridge	245 m (804 ft)	385 m (1,263 ft)	Arch; Concrete deck arch	Road bridge Jalan Trans Barelang; South China Sea	1997	Rempang - Galang Island (Riau Archipelago); 0°46′58.6″N 104°10′33.3″E	Riau Islands	
10	Barito Bridge	240 m (790 ft) (x2)	1,082 m (3,550 ft)	Suspension; Steel truss deck, steel pylons (90+240+90)x2	Road bridge Jalan Trans Kalimantan; Barito River	1997	Banjarmasin; 3°12′56.0″S 114°33′31.3″E	South Kalimantan	
11	Meteor Bridge	235 m (771 ft)	395 m (1,296 ft)	Suspension; Steel truss deck, steel pylons	Road bridge Trans-Papua Highway; Mamberamo River	1996	Jayapura Regency; 3°41′21.3″S 140°07′05.5″E	Papua	
12	Mahkota IV Bridge	220 m (720 ft)	440 m (1,440 ft)	Arch; Steel through arch	Road bridge Mahakam River	2020	Samarinda; 0°31′09.7″S 117°07′10.0″E	East Kalimantan	
13	Mahulu Bridge	200 m (660 ft)	800 m (2,600 ft)	Arch; Steel tied-arch	Road bridge Mahakam River	2003	Samarinda; 0°33′21.8″S 117°05′01.2″E	East Kalimantan	
14	Martadipura Bridge	200 m (660 ft)	569 m (1,867 ft)	Arch; Steel tied-arch	Road bridge Mahakam River	2004	Kotabangun; 0°13′14.9″S 116°35′35.6″E	East Kalimantan	
15	Tengku Agung Sultanah Latifah Bridge	200 m (660 ft)	1,196 m (3,924 ft)	Cable-stayed; Concrete beam deck, concrete pylons 94+200+94	Road bridge Jalan Buatan-Siak; Siak River	2007	Siak Regency; 0°48′27.2″N 102°01′34.9″E	Riau	
16	Rumpiang Bridge	200 m (660 ft)	754 m (2,474 ft)	Arch; Steel tied-arch	Road bridge Barito River	2008	Marabahan; 3°00′27.0″S 114°46′43.1″E	South Kalimantan	
17	Kalahien Bridge	200 m (660 ft)	620 m (2,030 ft)	Arch; Steel tied-arch	Road bridge Barito River	2010	Pamait; 1°38′12.6″S 114°48′28.6″E	Central Kalimantan	
18	Tayan Bridge	200 m (660 ft)	1,975 m (6,480 ft)	Arch; Steel through arch 75+200+75	Trans-Kalimantan Highway Southern Route; Kapuas River	2016	Sanggau Regency; 0°02′54.4″S 110°06′29.5″E	West Kalimantan	
19	Musi VI Bridge	200 m (660 ft)		Arch; Steel through arch	Road bridge Musi River	2018	Palembang; 3°00′17.2″S 104°45′02.9″E	South Sumatra	
20	Kendari Bay Bridge	200 m (660 ft)	1,348 m (4,423 ft)	Cable-stayed	Road bridge Kendari Bay	2020	Kendari	Southeast Sulawesi	
21	Perawang Bridge	180 m (590 ft)	1,473 m (4,833 ft)	Box girder Prestressed concrete 101+180+101	Road bridge Jalan Pemda; Siak River	2007	Maredan; 0°37′10.9″N 101°36′01.9″E	Riau	
22	Nara Singa Bridge	160 m (520 ft)	420 m (1,380 ft)	Box girder Prestressed concrete	Road bridge Jalan Trans Barelang; South China Sea	1997	Tonton Island - Nipah Island (Riau Archipelago); 0°58′35.6″N 104°02′57.4″E	Riau Islands	
23	Sultan Abdul Jalil Alamuddin Syah Bridge	155 m (509 ft)	800 m (2,600 ft)	Cable-stayed; Composite steel/concrete box girder deck, concrete pylons 155+70	Road bridge Siak River	2019	Pekanbaru; 0°32′21.0″N 101°26′51.5″E	Riau	
24	Merdeka Bridge	153 m (502 ft)	561 m (1,841 ft)	Arch; Steel through arch 62+153+62	Road bridge Barito River	2008	Puruk Cahu; 0°39′33.4″S 114°35′11.6″E	Central Kalimantan	
25	Batanghari II Bridge	153 m (502 ft)	1,351 m (4,432 ft)	Arch; Steel tied-arch	Road bridge Batang Hari River	2009	Jambi (city); 1°33′23.7″S 103°38′36.8″E	Jambi	
26	Cisomang Railroad Bridge	152 m (499 ft)	243 m (797 ft)	Arch; Steel deck arch	Road-rail bridge Ci Somang River	2004	Cisomang; 6°41′44.2″S 107°23′52.1″E	West Java	
27	Kahayan Bridge	150 m (490 ft)	645 m (2,116 ft)	Arch; Steel through arch	Road bridge Jalan Kapten Piere Tendean; Kahayan River	2002	Palangka Raya; 2°12′07.8″S 113°55′18.6″E	Central Kalimantan	
28	Pela River Bridge	150 m (490 ft)	420 m (1,380 ft)	Arch; Steel through arch 45+150+45	Road bridge Pela River	2010	Pela; 0°14′12.2″S 116°33′39.3″E	East Kalimantan	
29	Merah Putih Bridge	150 m (490 ft)	1,140 m (3,740 ft)	Cable-stayed; Composite steel/concrete beam deck, concrete pylons 75+150+75	Road bridge Ambon Bay	2016	Ambon; 3°39′42.4″S 128°11′53.6″E	Maluku	
30	Youtefa Bridge	150 m (490 ft) (x2)	732 m (2,402 ft)	Arch; Steel through arch	Road bridge Youtefa Bay	2019	Jayapura; 2°35′39.6″S 140°42′49.3″E	Papua	
31	Sultan Zainal Abidin Bridge	145 m (476 ft)	365 m (1,198 ft)	Box girder Prestressed concrete	Road bridge Jalan Trans Barelang; South China Sea	1997	Setoko Island - Rempang (Riau Archipelago); 0°56′46.3″N 104°04′41.7″E	Riau Islands	
32	Musi IV Bridge	142 m (466 ft)		Extradosed; Concrete box girder deck, concrete pylons	Road bridge Musi River		Palembang; 2°58′59.4″S 104°46′26.0″E	South Sumatra	
33	Rajamandala Bridge	132 m (433 ft)	222 m (728 ft)	Box girder Prestressed concrete 45+132+45	National Route 3 Citarum River	1979	Cipatat; 6°49′40.3″S 107°19′22.4″E	West Java	
34	Palu IV Bridge collapsed in 2018	125 m (410 ft) (x2)	300 m (980 ft)	Arch; Steel tied-arch	Road bridge Palu River	2006	Palu; 0°53′07.2″S 119°51′31.6″E	Central Sulawesi	
35	Rantau Berangin Bridge	121 m (397 ft)	201 m (659 ft)	Box girder Prestressed concrete 40+121+40	Road bridge Jalan Bangkinang-Payakumbuh; Kampar River	1974	Rantaubarangin; 0°18′04.0″N 100°54′51.2″E	Riau	
36	Danau Bingkuang Bridge	120 m (390 ft)	200 m (660 ft)	Truss; Steel; 40+120+40	Road bridge Jalan Bangkinang-Payakumbuh; Kampar River	1970	Bangkinang - Pekanbaru; 0°21′29.0″N 101°14′00.6″E	Riau	
37	Rumbai Jaya Bridge	120 m (390 ft)	710 m (2,330 ft)	Arch; Steel through arch	Road bridge Indragiri River	2004	Indragiri Hulu Regency; 0°30′27.8″S 102°55′49.8″E	Riau	
38	Tukad Bangkung Bridge	120 m (390 ft) (x2)	360 m (1,180 ft)	Box girder Prestressed concrete 60+120+120+60	Road bridge Jalan Catur	2006	Plaga; 8°17′47.2″S 115°14′01.9″E	Bali	
39	Soekarno Bridge	120 m (390 ft) (x2)	622 m (2,041 ft)	Cable-stayed; Concrete deck, steel pylons 120x2	Road bridge Jalan Boulevard II	2013	Manado; 1°29′46.0″N 124°50′22.7″E	North Sulawesi	
40	Pedamaran Bridge II	111 m (364 ft) (x3)	1,410 m (4,630 ft)	Extradosed; Concrete beam deck, 4 concrete pylons 63+111x3+63	Road bridge Rokan River	2016	Rokan Hilir Regency; 2°01′25.9″N 100°50′11.0″E	Riau	
41	Pedamaran Bridge I	111 m (364 ft) (x3)	1,020 m (3,350 ft)	Extradosed; Concrete beam deck, 4 concrete pylons 63+111x3+63	Road bridge Rokan River	2016	Rokan Hilir Regency; 2°03′40.4″N 100°51′21.3″E	Riau	
42	Pasupati Bridge	106 m (348 ft)	2,282 m (7,487 ft)	Cable-stayed; Concrete box girder deck, concrete pylon 106+55	Road bridge Jalan Layang Pasupati; Cikapundung River	2005	Bandung; 6°53′58.0″S 107°36′21.6″E	West Java	
43	Kapuas Timpah Bridge	105 m (344 ft)	255 m (837 ft)	Truss; Steel; 62+105+62	Road bridge Jalan Kalahien; Kapuas River	2010	Lungku Layang; 1°40′16.9″S 114°30′07.0″E	Central Kalimantan	
44	Air Teluk II Bridge	104 m (341 ft)	214 m (702 ft)	Box girder Prestressed concrete 55+104+55	Road bridge Jalan Betung-Sekayu	2006	Sekayu; 2°52′58.9″S 104°01′51.9″E	South Sumatra	
45	Mahakam Bridge	100 m (330 ft)	408 m (1,339 ft)	Truss; Steel; 60x3+100+60x2	Road bridge Mahakam River	1987	Samarinda; 0°31′11.4″S 117°07′09.8″E	East Kalimantan	
46	Musi II Bridge (1994)	100 m (330 ft)		Truss; Steel	Road bridge Musi River	1994	Palembang; 3°01′05.4″S 104°43′14.4″E	South Sumatra	
47	Musi II Bridge (2017)	100 m (330 ft)		Arch; Steel through arch	Road bridge Musi River	2017	Palembang; 3°01′04.5″S 104°43′12.8″E	South Sumatra	

== Notes and references ==
- Nicolas Janberg. "International Database for Civil and Structural Engineering". Structurae.com.
- Others references

== See also ==
- Transport in Indonesia
- Rail transport in Indonesia
- Geography of Indonesia
- List of islands of Indonesia
- List of toll roads in Indonesia
- List of roads and highways of Java
