= Kahayan =

Kahayan may refer to:

- Kahayan River, Kalimantan, Indonesia
- Kahayan Bridge, Kalimantan, Indonesia
- Kahayan language, an Austronesian language spoken in Indonesia
