= Chloritis gruneri =

Scientific classification
- Kingdom: Animalia
- Phylum: Mollusca
- Class: Gastropoda
- Order: Stylommatophora
- Family: Camaenidae
- Genus: Chloritis
- Species: C. gruneri

Binomial name
- Chloritis gruneri (L. Pfeiffer, 1845)

Synonyms
- Helix gruneri L. Pfeiffer, 1845

Species of gastropod

Chloritis gruneri is a species of air-breathing land snail, a terrestrial pulmonate gastropod mollusc in the family Camaenidae.

== Distribution ==
The type locality is unknown. Distribution include Kendari, Sulawesi.

== Shell description ==
The shell is large for the genus, brown, without hairs, somewhat elevated spire, umbilicated, the ends of the peristome connected with a strong, white callus bearing a more or less conspicuous tooth. The width of the shell is 34–45 mm.
