= Trans-Kalimantan Highway Southern Route =

National Road in Kalimantan, Indonesia

- Jalan Lintas Kalimantan Poros Selatan
- Jalan Lintas Kalimantan
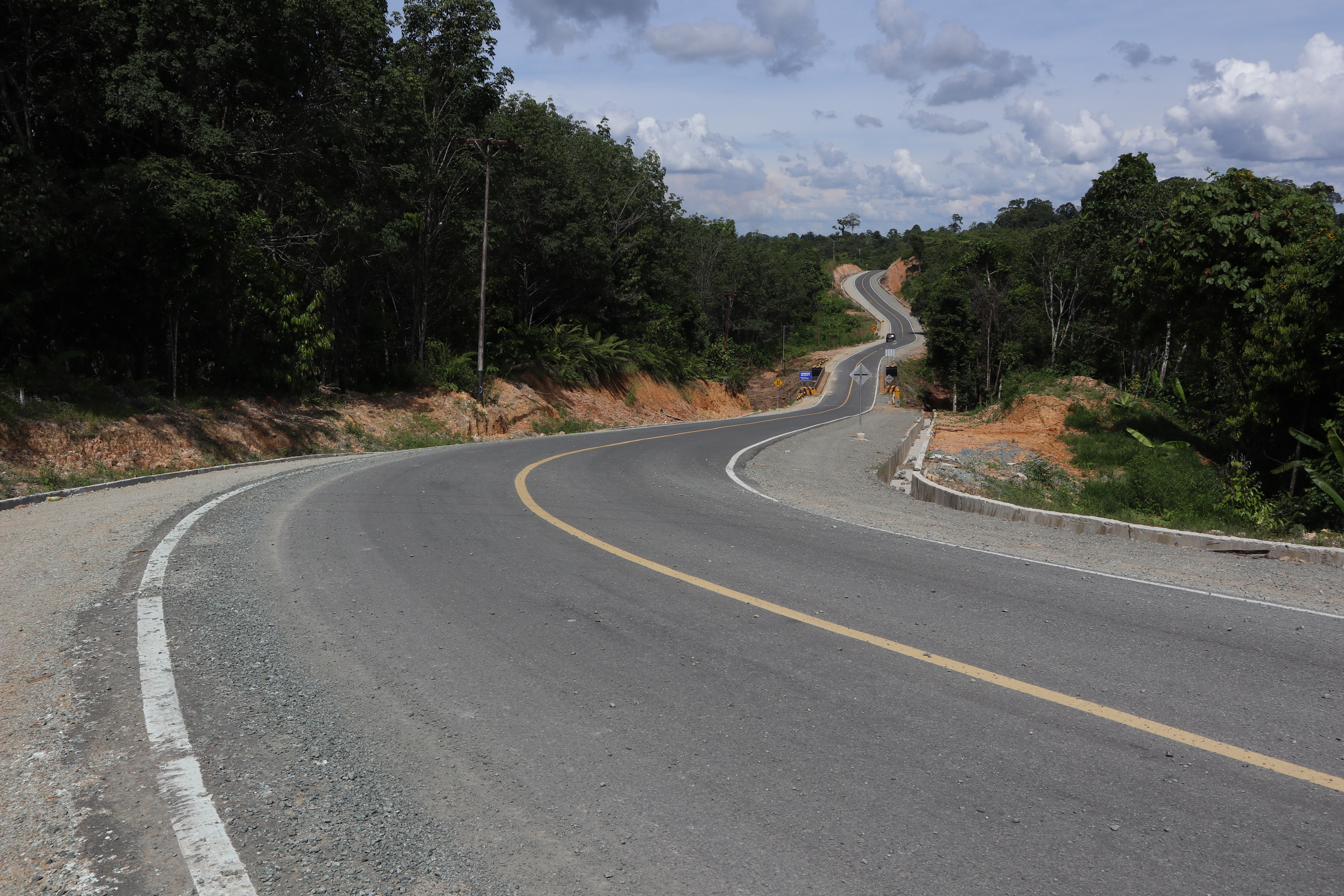

Route information
- Part of AH150
- Length: 3,901 km (2,424 mi)
- Existed: 1970s–present
- History: Completed in 2016

Major junctions
- West end: Aruk, Sambas Regency, West Kalimantan
- Q516 Lundu–Biawak Road; Trans-Kalimantan Highway Northern Route; Trans-Kalimantan Highway Central Route; Samarinda-Balikpapan Expressway; IKN Toll Road
- East end: Malinau City, Malinau Regency, North Kalimantan

Location
- Country: Indonesia
- Primary destinations: Sambas, Singkawang, Mempawah, Pontianak, Pangkalan Bun, Sampit, Palangkaraya, Kuala Kapuas, Banjarmasin, Banjarbaru, Martapura, Rantau, Kandangan, Barabai, Paringin, Balikpapan, Nusantara, Samarinda, Bontang, Sangatta, Tanjung Redeb, Tanjung Selor, Kabupaten Paser

Highway system
- Transport in Indonesia

The Trans-Kalimantan Highway Southern Route (Indonesian: Jalan Lintas Kalimantan Poros Selatan), or simply the Trans-Kalimantan Highway, (Indonesian: Jalan Lintas Kalimantan) is a 3,901-kilometre (2,424 mi) national road that forms the backbone highway system in Kalimantan, Indonesia. It forms a part of the larger Pan-Borneo Highway network which also combines with highway networks of East Malaysia and Brunei. The combined highway network forms the entire Asian Highway Network Route AH150.

The Trans-Kalimantan Highway Southern Route is linked to the Sarawak Pan-Borneo Highway FT1 via the Trans-Malindo Highway that links to the border crossing towns of Entikong and Tebedu. A new border crossing in Aruk at the western terminus of the Trans-Kalimantan Highway Southern Route was inaugurated by the President of Indonesia, Joko Widodo on 17 March 2017, which is linked to the Sarawak Pan-Borneo Highway FT1 via the Lundu–Biawak Road (Sarawak State Route Q516).

== Route background ==
The Trans-Kalimantan Highway Southern Route is one of the three backbone highways in Kalimantan being planned by the Indonesian government; the other two are the Trans-Kalimantan Highway Central Route (Jalan Lintas Kalimantan Poros Tengah) and the Trans-Kalimantan Highway Northern Route (Jalan Lintas Kalimantan Poros Utara). None of the three highways bear any route number yet. The total length of the Trans-Kalimantan Highway Southern Route is 3,901 kilometres (2,424 mi).

The Trans-Kalimantan Highway Southern Route is a semi-circular highway that runs along the coastlines of Kalimantan. The highway begins from Aruk, a small border town in Sambas Regency, West Kalimantan, where the highway continues in Sarawak as the Lundu–Biawak Road Q516. It passes through most major cities and towns in Kalimantan. Most major bridges in Kalimantan such as the Kapuas Bridge, Tayan Bridge, Barito Bridge and Mahakam Bridge are located along this highway. There is a missing link between Penajam and Balikpapan separated by Balikpapan Bay, requiring motorists to cross the bay by ferry or use a longer provincial highway that bypasses the bay. The missing link is planned to be eliminated through the construction of the Balang Island Bridge, which is targeted to be completed in 2019. From Balikpapan to Samarinda, the highway runs in parallel with the first controlled-access expressway in Borneo, the Samarinda-Balikpapan Expressway. The Trans-Kalimantan Highway Southern Route ends at Malinau City in North Kalimantan, where the highway is linked to the Trans-Kalimantan Highway Northern Route to Simanggaris.

The entire Trans-Kalimantan Highway Southern Route, together with the Trans-Malindo Highway and the section of the Trans-Kalimantan Highway Northern Route from Malinau City to Simanggaris, forms the Indonesian section of the Asian Highway Network route AH150.

== History ==
During colonial times in 1800s, the European colonists were obsessed in travelling across the Borneo island from east to west by land. In 1825, a troop of Dutch army led by Major George Muller began their expedition by going upstream along the Mahakam River from Samarinda to the river source before proceeding inland by foot. However, Muller and his troops mysteriously disappeared without any traces. Later, a Dutch doctor named Anton W. Niewenhuis became the first Dutch explorer who had successfully travelled across Borneo from Samarinda in the east to Pontianak in the west by land.

However, the Kalimantan region still lacked a proper highway network until 1970s where logging companies began constructing logging roads before those roads were converted into national roads by the Indonesian government. However, the construction to link the former logging roads to form the Trans-Kalimantan Highway was very sluggish. On 6 June 1989, the governors of the four Kalimantan provinces (West Kalimantan, Central Kalimantan, South Kalimantan and East Kalimantan) urged the central government to speed up the construction pace, and the Ministry of Public Works and People's Housing promised to them that the highway would be completed in 2009. The Trans Kalimantan Highway Southern Route was completed in 2016 with the opening of the Tayan Bridge. The first controlled-access highway in Kalimantan, Samarinda-Balikpapan Toll Road was completed in 2019. It is also targeted that Samarinda-Bontang Toll Road will be built in 2028.

The Trans-Kalimantan Highway Southern Route is notorious for its poor condition in many sections. As of 2010, 1,184 kilometres (736 mi) of the highway was built below the Asian Highway Network Class III standards (lane width: 3.0 m; design speed limit: 80 km/h). Many sections of the highway is still unpaved yet, including the first 12 kilometres (7.5 mi) from its western terminus at the new border crossing in Aruk.

== See also ==
- Trans-Sumatran Highway
- Trans-Sulawesi Highway
