= Chloritis minahassae =

Scientific classification
- Domain: Eukaryota
- Kingdom: Animalia
- Phylum: Mollusca
- Class: Gastropoda
- Order: Stylommatophora
- Family: Camaenidae
- Genus: Chloritis
- Species: C. minahassae

Binomial name
- Chloritis minahassae P. & F. Sarasin, 1899

Species of gastropod

Chloritis minahassae is a species of air-breathing land snail, a terrestrial pulmonate gastropod mollusk in the family Camaenidae.

== Distribution ==
Location of Mount Tongkoko, where Chloritis minahassae lives.

The type locality is the peak of the Sudara volcano, Northern Sulawesi; in German language: "Nord Celebes, Gipfel des Vulkans Sudara; Vulkan Lokon; Bone Gebirge".

New records by Maassen (2009) are from northern Sulawesi: Tangkoko Nature Reserve, moss forest at Sudara Vulcano; east Shore Lake Tondok, 12.5 km east of Kotamobagu, 00°43.44’N 124°26.40’E.

== Shell description ==
The shell is small for the genus, brown, with hairs, with impressed spire, umbilicated, the ends of the peristome connected with a thin callus. The width of the shell is 11–13 mm.
