= Chloritis balatensis =

Scientific classification
- Kingdom: Animalia
- Phylum: Mollusca
- Class: Gastropoda
- Order: Stylommatophora
- Family: Camaenidae
- Genus: Chloritis
- Species: C. balatensis

Binomial name
- Chloritis balatensis (Kobelt, 1896)

Synonyms
- Helix (Chloritis) balatensis Kobelt, 1896

Species of gastropod

Chloritis balatensis is a species of air-breathing land snail, a terrestrial pulmonate gastropod mollusk in the family Camaenidae.

== Distribution ==
The type locality for this species is described as Balante auf Celebes, in Sulawesi, Indonesia.

== Shell description ==
The shell is large for the genus Chloritis. It is brown, hairless, not completely flat, umbilicated. The ends of the peristome are connected with a thin callus. The width of the shell is 40–46 mm.

The species was described from only one specimen (“ein tadellos erhaltenes Stück”), which is the holotype by monotypy, stored in the Staatliche Naturhistorische Sammlungen Dresden, Museum für Tierkunde, Dresden, Germany, number 10199.

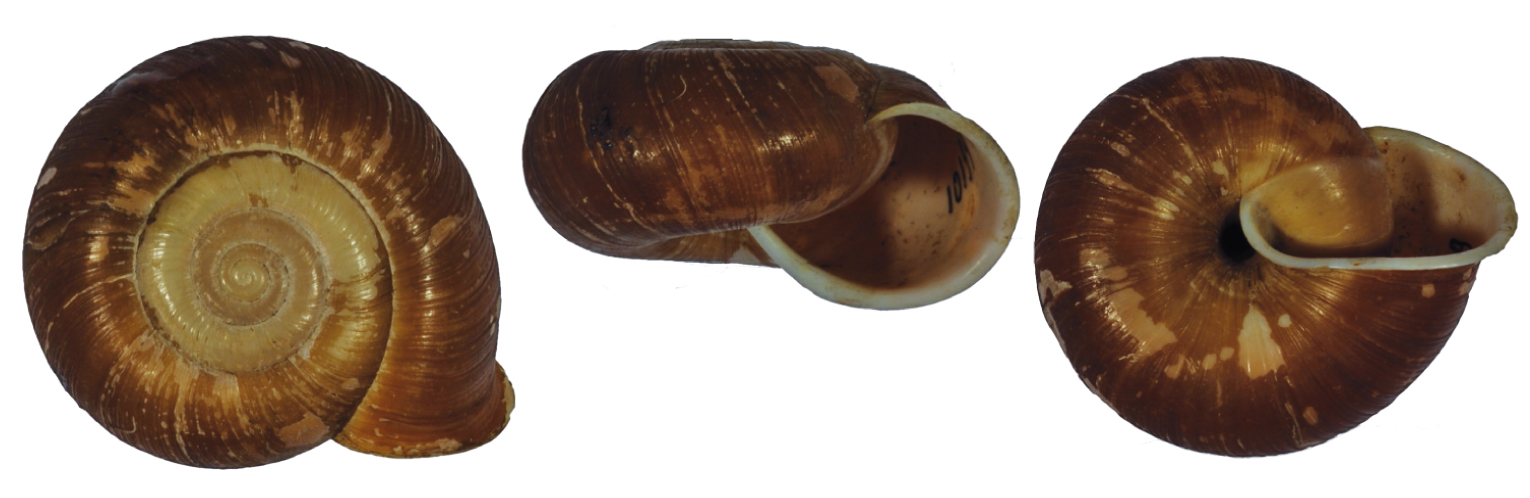
Apical, apertural and umbilical view of the shell of the holotype of Chloritis balatensis. The width of the shell is 41 mm.
