= Al-Alam Mosque =

Mosque in Indonesia

Coordinates: 3.9781°S 122.5445°E

Al-Alam Mosque Masjid Al-Alam

Religion
- Affiliation: Islam
- Branch/tradition: Sunni

Location
- Location: Kendari, Southeast Sulawesi, Indonesia
- Interactive map of Al-Alam Mosque; Masjid Al-Alam

Architecture
- Type: Mosque
- Groundbreaking: 2010
- Completed: 2018
- Construction cost: 200 billion Rp. (13 million USD)

Specifications
- Capacity: 10,000
- Dome: 1
- Minaret: 4

Website
- https://www.masjidalalam.org/

Al-Alam Mosque is a mosque in the city of Kendari, Southeast Sulawesi, Indonesia. The mosque is a destination for religious tourism. The notable features of the mosque include its location in the middle of Kendari bay, and its unique minarets that are shaped like the Burj Al Arab in Dubai.

== Description ==
The groundbreaking for the mosque was initiated in 2010 by Nur Alam, the former governor of Southeast Sulawesi. The mosque was inaugurated in 2018. The mosque takes its name from the former governor.

The mosque is located in the middle of Kendari bay and connected to the mainland by the Al-Alam Mosque street. During high tides, the mosque gives the impression of floating on the ocean. It is considered the third floating mosque in the world after Al-Rahma Mosque in Jeddah and Hassan II Mosque in Casablanca.

Architecturally, the mosque was inspired by the Al-Masjid an-Nabawi of Madina, Saudi Arabia. The four minarets of the mosque are built in the shape of Burj Al Arab luxury hotel in Dubai. The main dome has a semi-circular base with an opening and closing mechanism of the eight flower petals. The number eight is considered to symbolize Islam as well as the local hero Halu Oleo. The sliding dome mechanism uses technology from Germany and resembles that of Al-Masjid An-Nabawi. The mosque also employs shading umbrellas in the front yard which function as an additional place of worship when the main area is full. The appearance of these shading umbrellas also mimics the Medina Mosque.
