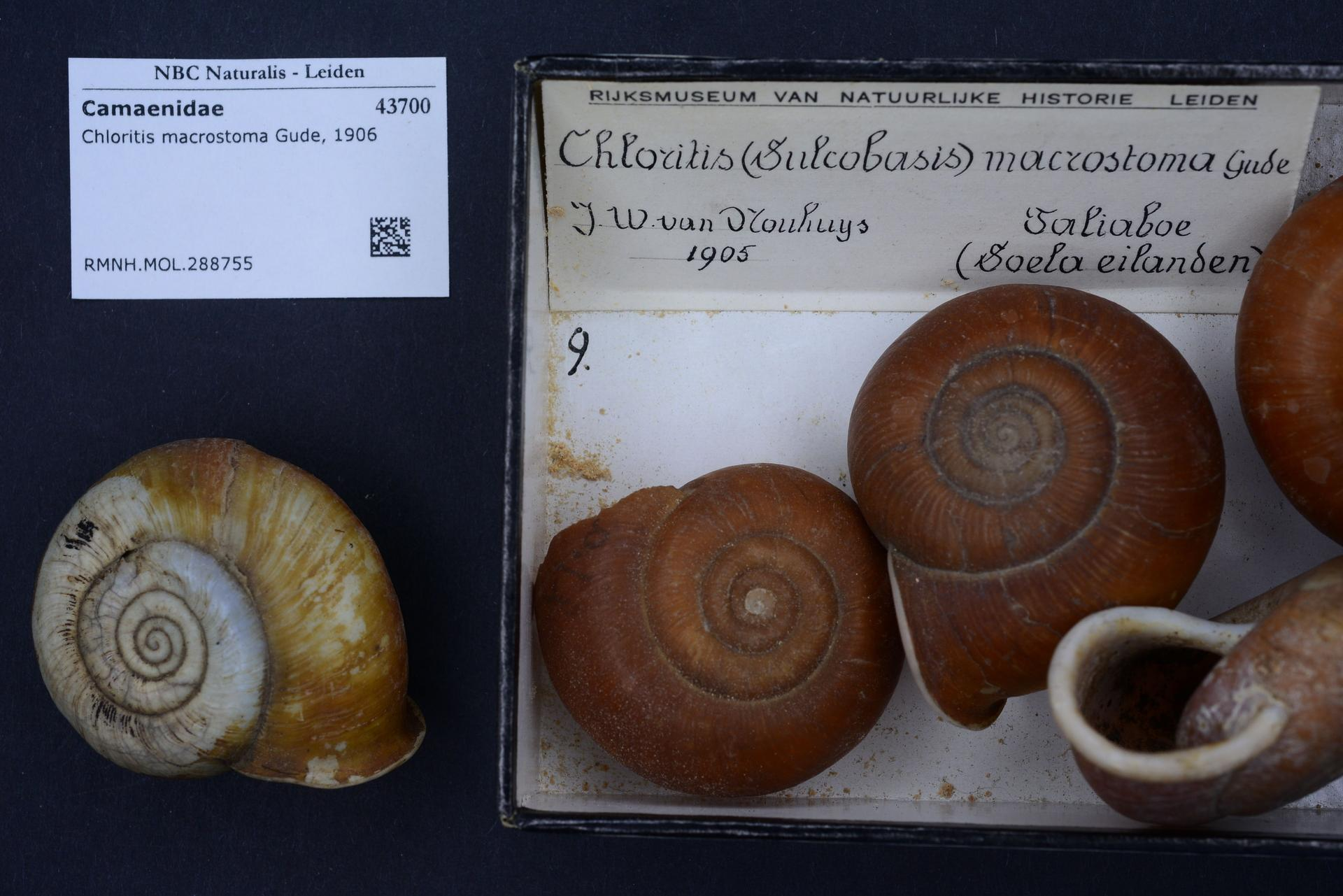
- Chloritis macrostoma shells

Scientific classification
- Kingdom: Animalia
- Phylum: Mollusca
- Class: Gastropoda
- Order: Stylommatophora
- Family: Camaenidae
- Genus: Chloritis
- Species: C. macrostoma

Binomial name
- Chloritis macrostoma Gude, 1906

= Chloritis macrostoma =

Species of gastropod

Chloritis macrostoma is a species of air-breathing land snail, a terrestrial pulmonate gastropod mollusk in the family Camaenidae.

== Distribution ==
The type locality is Bangaya, off East Sulawesi, Indonesia.

== Shell description ==
The shell is large for the genus, brown, without hairs, completely flat, umbilicated, the ends of the peristome connected with a thin callus. The width of the shell is 37–48 mm.
