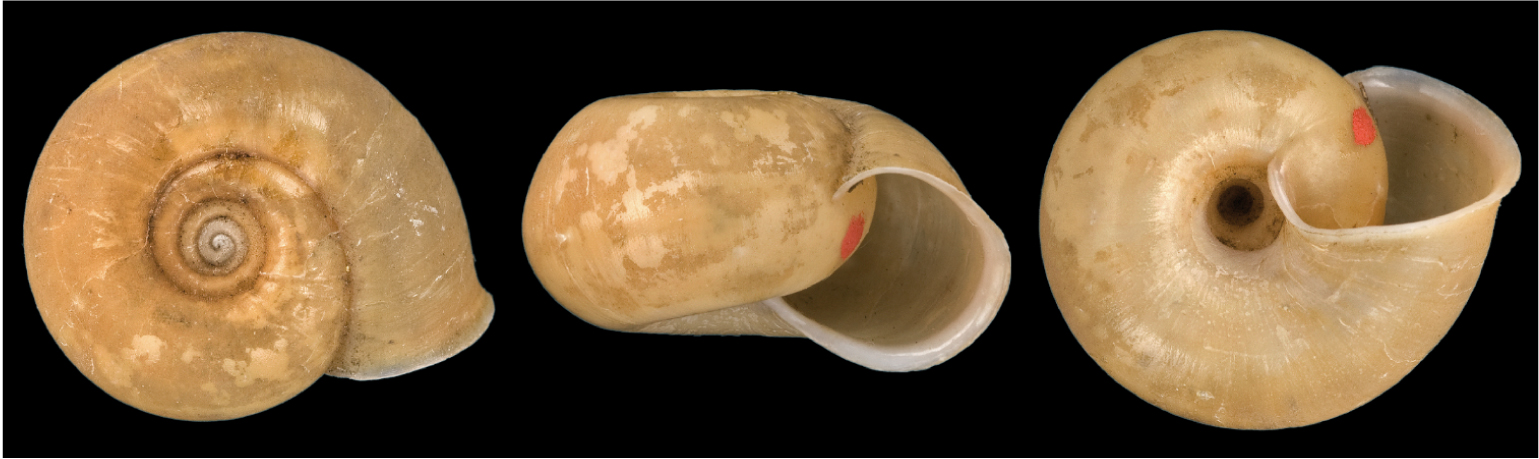
- three views of the shell of Chloritis biomphala

Scientific classification
- Domain: Eukaryota
- Kingdom: Animalia
- Phylum: Mollusca
- Class: Gastropoda
- Order: Stylommatophora
- Infraorder: Helicoidei
- Superfamily: Helicoidea
- Family: Camaenidae
- Genus: Chloritis; Beck, 1837

Synonyms
- Chloritis (Chloritis) H. Beck, 1837 · accepted, alternate representation; Chloritis (Eustomopsis) Gude, 1906· accepted, alternate representation; Chloritis (Trichochloritis) Pilsbry, 1891 · accepted, alternate representation; Erigone Albers, 1850; Eustomopsis Gude, 1906; Eustomopsis (Verdichloritis) Clench, 1957 (junior synonym); Helerigone Strand, 1910; Helix (Chloritis) Beck, 1837 (original rank); Helix (Erigone) Albers, 1850 (Invalid: junior homonym of Erigone Audouin, 1826 [Arachnida]); Parvisheba Iredale, 1958 (junior synonym); Sheba Iredale, 1941 (invalid: junior homonym of Sheba Baird, 1860 [Mollusca]); Verdichloritis Clench, 1957 (junior synonym)

= Chloritis =

Genus of gastropods

Chloritis is a genus of air-breathing land snails, terrestrial pulmonate gastropod mollusks in the subfamily Hadrinae of the family Camaenidae.

The genus Chloritis is restricted to South-east Asia (from China to India and up to New Guinea) with numerous species having usually small distributional ranges.

== Shell description ==
The conchological characters of the species belonging to the genus Chloritis are the more or less compact shells, the biconcave or a hardly elevated spire. The first whorls are quite narrow, rounded, the apical ones with regularly arranged granules or hair pits. Last whorl is widened suddenly, with a more or less open umbilicus. The aperture is lunate. The peristome is reflected, connected in most cases by a thin callus.

== Species ==
Some researchers divided the genus Chloritis in a number of rather poorly defined subgenera, or even consider these subgenera as genera. The characters used for these separations are only shell features; unfortunately from only a few species the anatomy is known. Here the more conservative systematic classification (only one genus Chloritis) is followed as proposed by Vaught (1989).

Species within the genus Chloritis include:

- Chloritis abletti Thach & F. Huber, 2018
- Chloritis addita I. Rensch, 1935
- Chloritis balansai (Morlet, 1886)
- Chloritis balatensis (Kobelt, 1896) - from Sulawesi
- Chloritis beddomei Gude, 1906
- Chloritis bellonensis (Clench, 1958)
- Chloritis bifoveata (Benson, 1856) - from West Malaysia
- Chloritis biomphala (L. Pfeiffer, 1862) - from Sulawesi
- Chloritis camaratus Dall, 1910
- Chloritis caseus (L. Pfeiffer, 1860)
- Chloritis ceramensis (L. Pfeiffer, 1861)
- Chloritis circumdata (A.E.J. Férussac, 1821)
- Chloritis concisa (Férussac, 1823)
- Chloritis crassula (Philippi, 1844)
- Chloritis delibrata (Benson, 1836)
- Chloritis deliciosa (L. Pfeiffer, 1863)
- Chloritis dentrecasteauxi (E. A. Smith, 1884)
- Chloritis diplochone Möllendorff, 1898
- Chloritis discordialis (Deshayes, 1839)
- Chloritis durandi (Bavay & Dautzenberg, 1900)
- Chloritis eustoma (Pfeiffer, 1857)
- Chloritis flexuosa (L. Pfeiffer, 1855)
- Chloritis fraudulenta Gude, 1906: synonym of Sulcobasis fraudulenta (Gude, 1906)
- Chloritis gabata (Gould, 1844)
- Chloritis gaymardi (Deshayes, 1831)
- Chloritis gruneri (L. Pfeiffer, 1845) - from Sulawesi
- Chloritis helicinoides (Mousson, 1848)
- Chloritis heteromphalus Pilsbry, 1906
- Chloritis holoserica Gude, 1906
- Chloritis howesii E. A. Smith, 1896
- Chloritis huberi Thach, 2016 (taxon inquirendum)
- Chloritis impotens Pilsbry & Y. Hirase, 1908
- Chloritis johannisi Cilia, 2010
- Chloritis khammouanensis Inkhavilay & Panha, 2019
- Chloritis klausgrohi Thach & F. Huber, 2017
- Chloritis leithi Gude, 1914
- Chloritis lemeslei (Morlet, 1891)
- Chloritis leytensis Möllendorff, 1890
- Chloritis macrostoma Gude, 1906 - from Sulawesi
- Chloritis malayana (Möllendorff, 1887)
- Chloritis mansonensis Gude, 1906: synonym of Trichochloritis mansonensis (Gude, 1906) (original combination)
- Chloritis marimberti (Bavay & Dautzenberg, 1900)
- Chloritis martensi (L. Pfeiffer, 1861)
- Chloritis mertensi I. Rensch, 1930
- Chloritis mima Fulton, 1899
- Chloritis minahassae P. & F. Sarasin, 1899 - from Sulawesi
- Chloritis molliseta (L. Pfeiffer, 1863)
- Chloritis nasuta (Bavay & Dautzenberg, 1909)
- Chloritis norodomiana (Morlet, 1883)
- Chloritis pervicina E. A. Smith, 1897
- Chloritis planorbina Haas, 1912 - from Sulawesi
- Chloritis platytropis Möllendorff, 1894
- Chloritis polingi (Clench, 1957)
- Chloritis procumbens (Gould, 1843)
- Chloritis propinqua (Pfeiffer, 1857)
- Chloritis quadrivolvis (Martens, 1865)
- Chloritis quercina (Pfeiffer, 1857)
- Chloritis remoratrix (Morlet, 1893)
- Chloritis sanziana (Hombron & Jacquinot, 1849)
- Chloritis selenitoides Fulton, 1899
- Chloritis siamensis Möllendorff, 1902
- Chloritis spinosissima C. Semper, 1880
- Chloritis subsulcata Möllendorff, 1894
- Chloritis sumbawana B. Rensch, 1930
- Chloritis talabensis (Kobelt, 1896) - from Sulawesi
- Chloritis tenella (L. Pfeiffer, 1862)
- Chloritis teres Gude, 1906
- Chloritis tetragyra Möllendorff, 1897
- Chloritis thachi F. Huber, 2018
- Chloritis theobaldi Gude, 1914
- Chloritis togianensis Maassen, 2009 - from Sulawesi
- Chloritis transversalis (Mousson, 1857)
- Chloritis unguiculastra (Martens, 1867)
- Chloritis ungulina (Linnaeus, 1758) - type species
- Chloritis vanbruggeni Maassen, 2009 - from Sulawesi
- Chloritis vinhensis Thach & F. Huber, 2018
