= Chloritis biomphala =

Scientific classification
- Kingdom: Animalia
- Phylum: Mollusca
- Class: Gastropoda
- Order: Stylommatophora
- Family: Camaenidae
- Genus: Chloritis
- Species: C. biomphala

Binomial name
- Chloritis biomphala (L. Pfeiffer, 1862)

Synonyms
- Helix biomphala L. Pfeiffer, 1862

Species of gastropod

Chloritis biomphala is a species of land snail, a terrestrial pulmonate gastropod mollusk in the family Camaenidae.

== Distribution ==
The type locality is Seram Island ("in insula Ceram"), Indonesia. Other locality include Sulawesi, Indonesia.

== Shell description ==
The shell has moderate size for the genus, brown, without hairs, completely flat, umbilicated, the ends of the peristome connected with a thin callus. The width of the shell is 17–20 mm.

The species is probably described after more than one specimen (a number is not given in the original description, but in the dimensions 10–11 mm is given for the shell height). The species has been never recorded again.

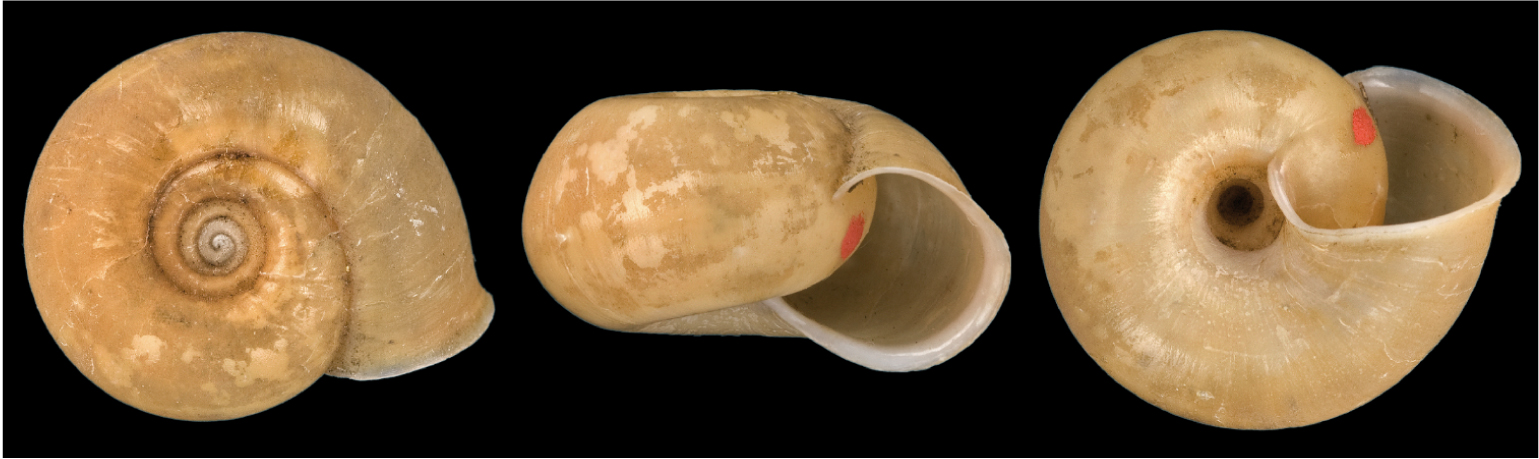
Apical, apertural and umbilical view of the shell of the syntype of Chloritis biomphala. The width of the shell is 20 mm.
