= Chloritis togianensis =

Scientific classification
- Domain: Eukaryota
- Kingdom: Animalia
- Phylum: Mollusca
- Class: Gastropoda
- Order: Stylommatophora
- Family: Camaenidae
- Genus: Chloritis
- Species: C. togianensis

Binomial name
- Chloritis togianensis Maassen, 2009

Species of gastropod

Chloritis togianensis is a species of air-breathing land snail, a terrestrial pulmonate gastropod mollusk in the family Camaenidae.

The specific name togianensis is after the type locality Togian Island.

== Distribution ==
The type locality is Togian Island, principle island of the Togian Archipelago, lying in the Tomini Bay, Central Sulawesi, Indonesia.

== Shell description ==
The shell is solid, unicolored light ochre, biconcave, irregularly striated according to some growth lines, with numerous hair pits covering the whole surface. The spire is deeply sunken. The shell has 3 3/4-4 1/2 whorls. Whorls are rounded, first whorls very narrow, the last one very large, and partly embracing the preceding one, distinctly descending in front. The umbilicus is deep, and about 1/8 of the width of the shell. The aperture is crescent, a little oblique, peristome thick and expanded all around and is somewhat reflexed; both ends connected by a quite thin callus. The width of the shell is 17.1-19.9 mm. The height of the shell is 9.5-11.7 mm.

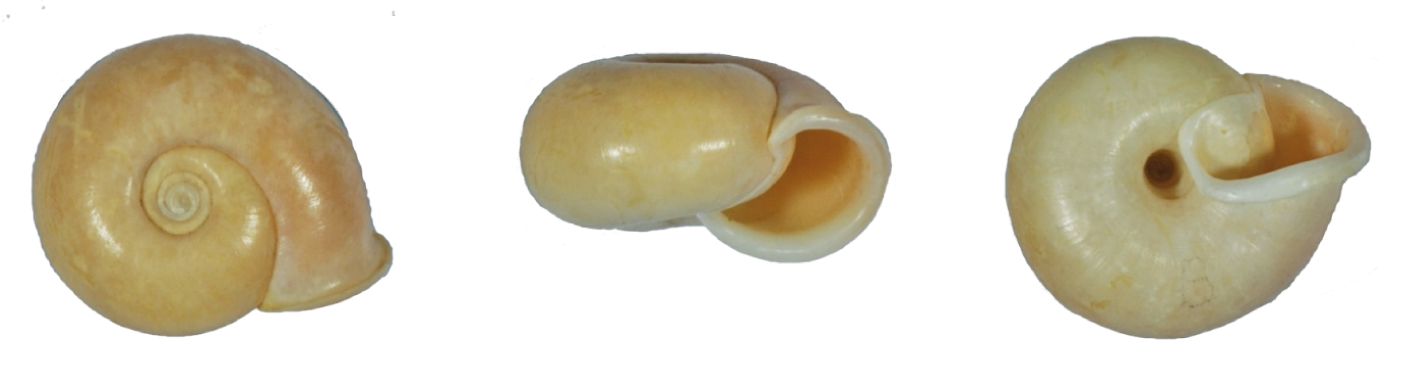
Apical, apertural and umbilical view of the shell of the holotype of Chloritis togianensis. The width of the shell is 18.4 mm. The height of the shell is 9.8 mm.

The species may be compared to only a few species showing the same kind of rotating of the penultimate whorl especially, and possessing simultaneously a sunken shell shape. Chloritis bifoveata (Benson, 1856) from West Malaysia is smaller (width is 15 mm), and the spire is much deeper; Chloritis unguiculastra (Martens, 1867) is somewhat larger (width is 22 mm), is smooth without hair or hair pits, and is more regularly coiled; Chloritis ungulina (Linnaeus, 1758) is much larger (width is 44 mm) is smooth without hair or hair pits, has a groove at the base of the penultimate whorl near the umbilicus and the whorls are more flattened, not rounded.
