= Chloritis talabensis =

Scientific classification
- Kingdom: Animalia
- Phylum: Mollusca
- Class: Gastropoda
- Order: Stylommatophora
- Family: Camaenidae
- Genus: Chloritis
- Species: C. talabensis

Binomial name
- Chloritis talabensis (Kobelt, 1896)

Synonyms
- Helix (Chloritis) talabensis Kobelt, 1896

Species of gastropod

Chloritis talabensis is a species of air-breathing land snail, a terrestrial pulmonate gastropod mollusk in the family Camaenidae.

== Distribution ==
The type locality is Balante auf Celebes, Sulawesi, Indonesia.

The species was described after only one specimen (“ein schönes Stück”), holotype by monotypy stored in the Staatliche Naturhistorische Sammlungen Dresden, Museum für Tierkunde, Dresden, Germany, number 10198. The species has been never recorded again since its discovery.

== Shell description ==
The shell is of moderate size for the genus, brown, with hairs, spire somewhat elevated, umbilicated, the ends of the peristome connected with a thin callus. The width of the shell is 24 mm.

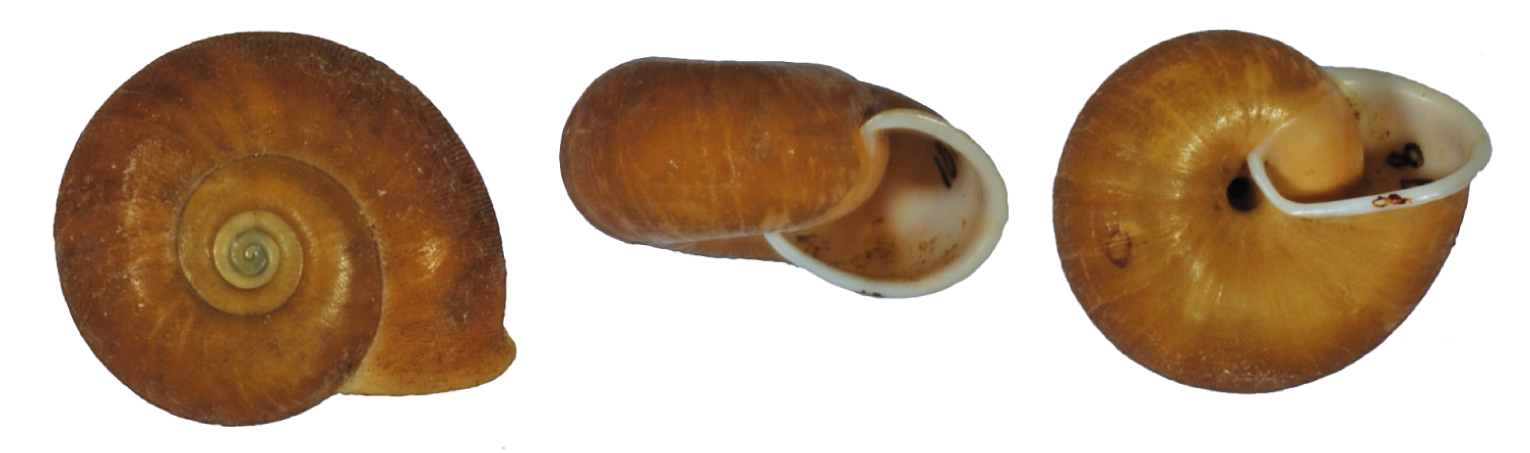
Apical, apertural and umbilical view of the shell of the holotype of Chloritis talabensis. The width of the shell is 24 mm.
