= Chloritis planorbina =

Scientific classification
- Kingdom: Animalia
- Phylum: Mollusca
- Class: Gastropoda
- Order: Stylommatophora
- Family: Camaenidae
- Genus: Chloritis
- Species: C. planorbina

Binomial name
- Chloritis planorbina Haas, 1912

Species of gastropod

Chloritis planorbina is a species of air-breathing land snail, a terrestrial pulmonate gastropod mollusk in the family Camaenidae.

== Distribution ==
The type locality is Roembia, South-eastern Sulawesi, Indonesia. The species has been described after two specimens and it has not been recorded again.

== Shell description ==
The shell is moderately in size for the genus, without hairs and brownish corneous. The spire is somewhat impressed. The shell is umbilicated. The ends of the peristome are connected by a thin callus. The width of the shell is 19.5–24 mm.
