= Kolaka incident =

Ambush of a Dutch military convoy (1945)

- Part of the Indonesian National Revolution
| Date | 19 November 1945 |
| Location | near Kolaka, Southeast Sulawesi |
| Result | Indonesian victory |

Belligerents
| Indonesia | Netherlands; Japan |

Strength
| 1,000 militias | Small number of NICA; 1 Japanese platoon |

Casualties and losses
| 1 killed 1 injured | 2 killed 2 captured |

The Kolaka incident, known locally as the 19 November incident (Peristiwa 19 November), was an ambush of a Dutch military convoy near Kolaka, Southeast Sulawesi on 19 November 1945, during the early months of the Indonesian National Revolution.

== Background ==
One month after the proclamation of Indonesian independence on 17 August 1945, a group of nationalists in Kolaka declared that the region was Indonesian and formed a local militia. By October 1945, the militia had expanded to other parts in Southeast Sulawesi, including to Kendari, but the following month as Allied (mostly Australian) forces under NICA arrived in Kendari, they restored Dutch control. However, the Dutch control over Southeast Sulawesi (partly enforced by Japanese troops still in the area) was tenuous, and in an attempt to improve the situation there the KNIL forces initially intended to be stationed in the Palopo area was diverted to Kendari. The nationalist militia in Kolaka was led by a group of former KNIL soldiers who were assigned by Japan to work on the nickel mines in Kolaka. Kolaka's Japanese garrison attempted to dispose of their weapons by throwing them into the sea to prevent the nationalists from seizing them, but the militia managed to recover the weapons.

== Incident ==
On 19 November, some 1,000 militia members (partly armed with melee weapons) were deployed to the road leading to Pomaala, where the nickel mines were based. NICA had sent a small convoy to the village in order to pick up the former KNIL members, despite protestations from the nationalists in Kolaka.

The convoy, accompanied by one platoon of Japanese soldiers, were ambushed upon their return from Pomaala. The Japanese platoon quickly surrendered while the small number of NICA soldiers were quickly dispersed, with 2 killed and 2 captured alongside their vehicles and equipment. The nationalists suffered one death and one injury in the ambush.

== Aftermath ==
Shortly after the incident, the casualties and prisoners were recovered by Australian forces in Kendari after brief negotiations, though the militia retained the equipment they had seized from the Japanese garrison. Kolaka itself was captured by NICA forces following a brief fight on 5 February 1946, though the militia withdrew to the countryside, and the nationalist guerilla movement was not largely pacified by the Dutch until 1948.

=== Legacy ===
While the incident was of a much smaller scale compared to, say, the Battle of Surabaya which started nine days before the ambush, the incident has found its way into the names of various entities in Kolaka, including an urban community and a university in Kolaka. A monument in Kolaka commemorates the incident.

== Bibliography ==
- Chalik, Husein A.; Mekno, A. Djohan; Galib, Abd.; Lasang, Nio (1983). Sejarah perlawanan terhadap Imperialisme dan Kolonialisme di daerah Sulawesi Tenggara [History of the struggle against Imperialism and Colonialism in Southeast Sulawesi] (PDF) (in Indonesian). Jakarta: Ministry of Education and Culture.
