= Nusantara International Airport =

Future airport in Kalimantan, Indonesia

Nusantara International Airport Bandar Udara Internasional Nusantara
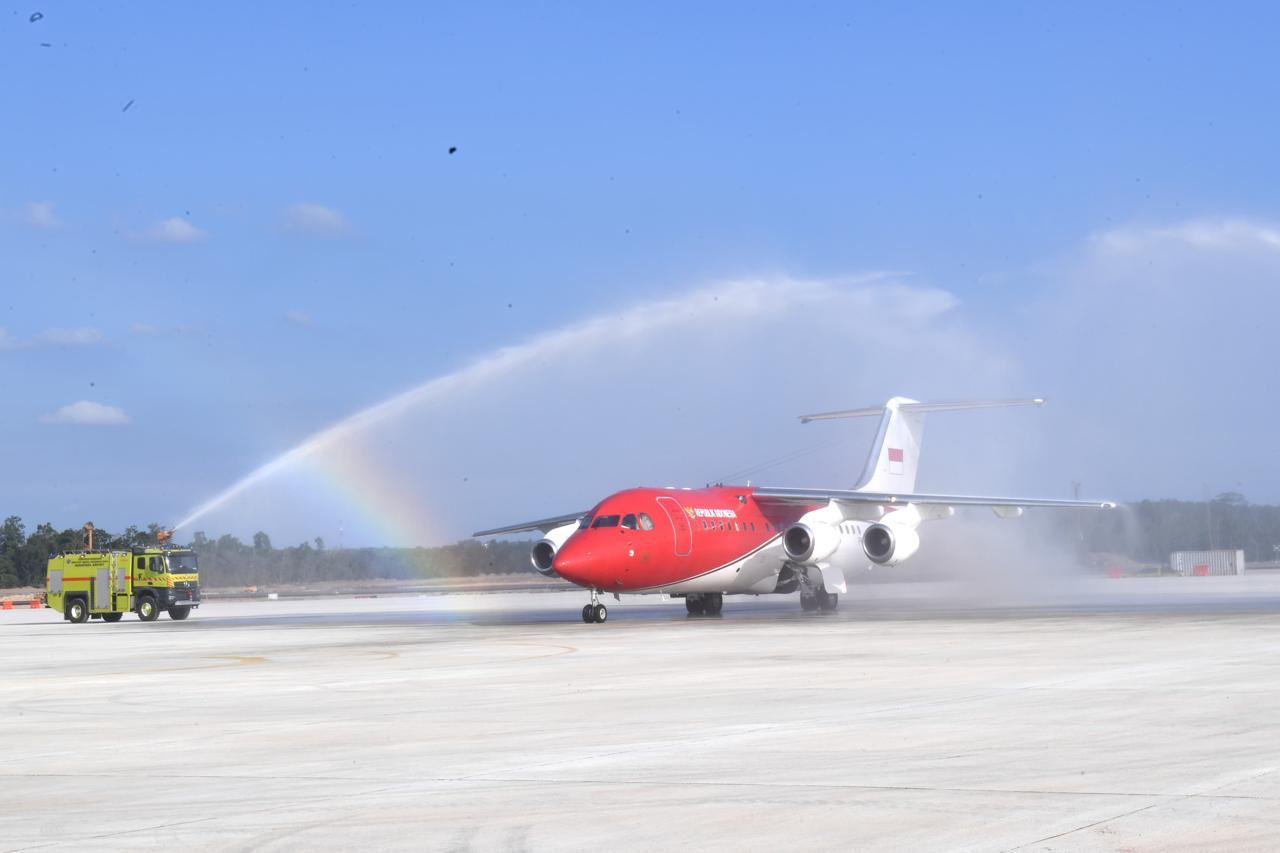
- Indonesian presidential aircraft's first landing at the airport on 25 September 2024
- IATA: none; ICAO: WALK

Summary
- Airport type: Public
- Serves: Nusantara
- Location: Sepaku and Penajam, Penajam North Paser Regency, East Kalimantan, Indonesia
- Opened: 2024 (inauguration); 2026 (planned opening)
- Time zone: Central Indonesian Time (UTC+08:00)
- Elevation AMSL: 134 ft (41 m)
- Coordinates: 1°09′36″S 116°42′19″E
- Interactive map of Nusantara International Airport

Runways
Direction	Length		Surface
Direction	ft	m	Surface
14/32	9,843	3,000	Asphalt

Nusantara International Airport (ICAO: WALK) is an airport serving Nusantara, the new capital of Indonesia. The airport is 23 km from the Point Zero of Nusantara and 120 km by road from Balikpapan. The airport lies about 25 km northwest of the Balikpapan Airport and 107 km southwest of the Samarinda Airport. The airport was inaugurated in 2024, but is not expected to serve commercial traffic until 2026.

== Development ==
Construction of the airport started on 1 November 2023, which was completed by 31 December 2024. The terminal area of the airport is about 7,350 square meters with an airport area covering 347 hectares of land. The runway under construction measures 3,500 meters in length and 45 meters in width, allowing for the landing of wide-body aircraft such as the Boeing 777-300ER and Airbus A380.

The airport apron is capable of accommodating three wide-body aircraft and also has helipads for three helicopters; various other supporting facilities will provide comprehensive services for all types of flights. The cost of the project is estimated at about Rp 4.3 trillion (US$261 million).

== Operational history ==
On 24 September 2024, the presidential RJ-85 aircraft carrying President Joko Widodo made its first landing at the Nusantara International Airport. The touchdown on the 2,200-metre runway was followed by a traditional water salute from fire trucks.
