= Kahayan Bridge =

Bridge in Palangka Raya, Indonesia

Coordinates: 2.2023°S 113.9217°E

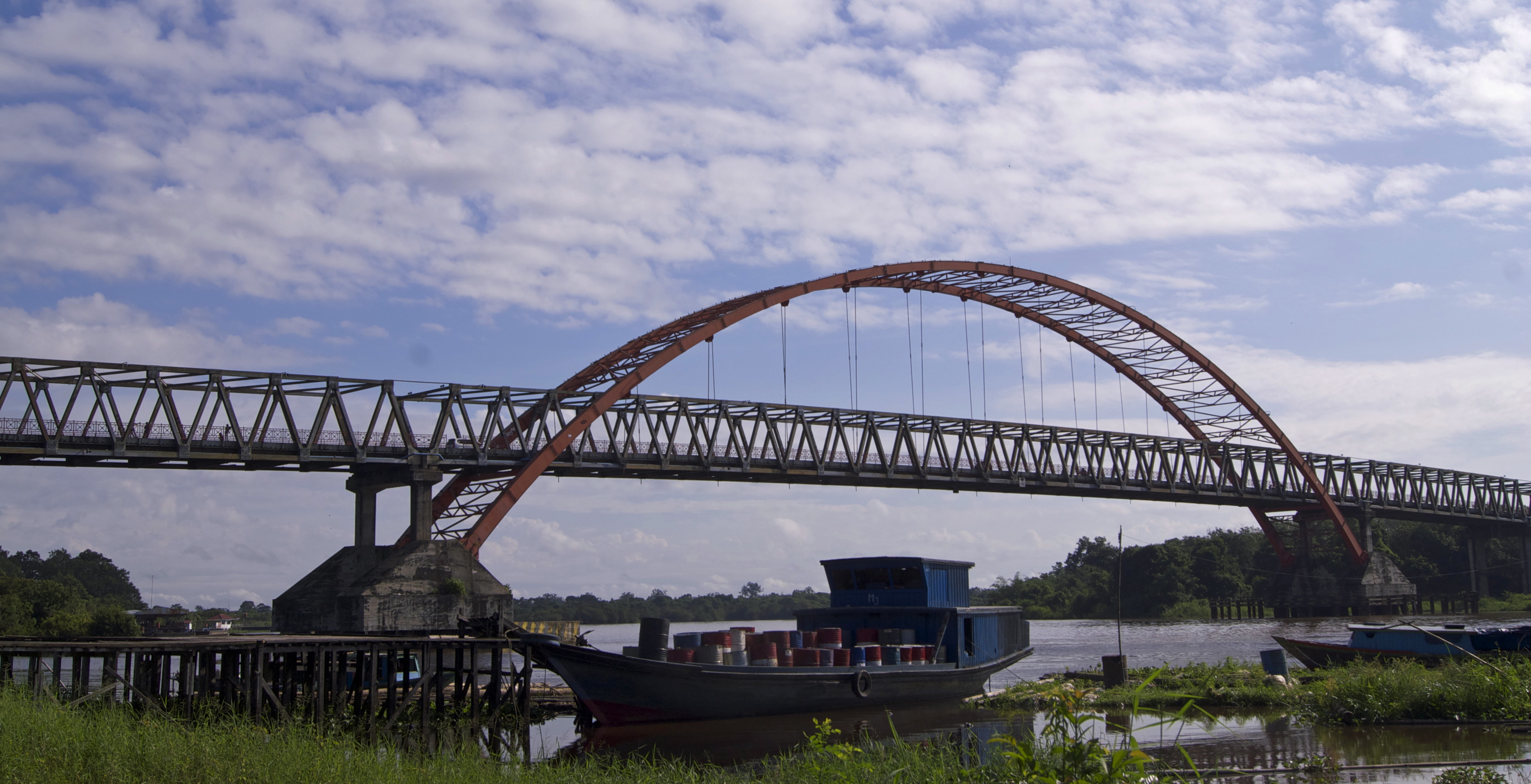
The bridge, as seen in 2013

The Kahayan Bridge is a bridge that divides the Kahayan River in Palangka Raya, Indonesia. The bridge is 640 meters long and 9 meters wide, consisting of 12 spans with a special span of 150 meters in the river shipping channel.

The bridge was first built in 1995 and completed in 2001, and was inaugurated by President Megawati Soekarnoputri on January 13 2002. The Kahayan Bridge connects the center of Palangka Raya City with Pahandut Seberang Subdistrict and penetrates Pulang Pisau Regency, Gunung Mas Regency, Kapuas Regency, South Barito, North Barito Regency, and others.

== See also ==
- List of bridges in Indonesia
