= Kendari Bay Bridge =

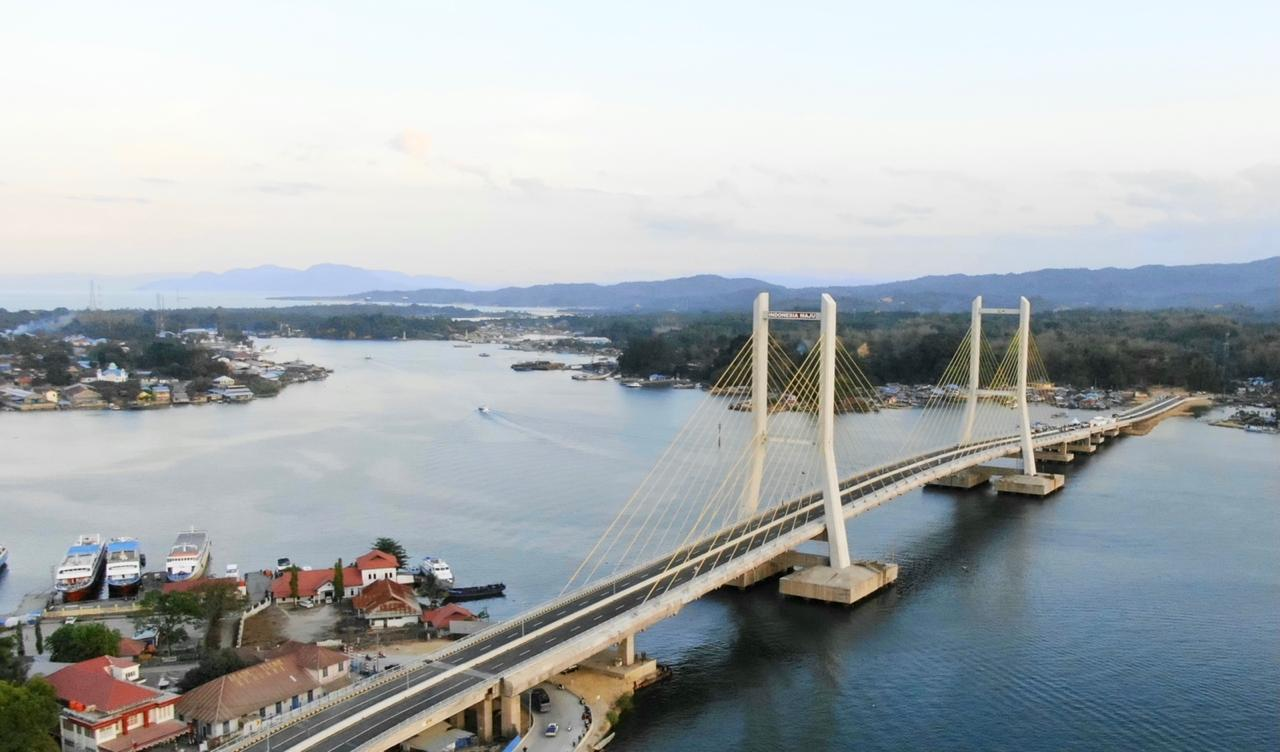
- Kendari Bay Bridge from the north side
- Coordinates: 3°58′40″S 122°35′13″E
- Carries: Wheeled vehicles on Jalan W.R. Supratman
- Crosses: Kendari Bay
- Locale: Kendari, Southeast Sulawesi
- Begins: Kendari District, Kendari
- Ends: Abeli District, Kendari
- Maintained by: Southeast Sulawesi Provincial Government

Characteristics
- Design: cable-stayed bridge
- Total length: 1,348 metres (4,423 ft)
- Width: 25 metres (82 ft)
- Longest span: 200 metres (656 ft)
- No. of lanes: 4

History
- Constructed by: PP Construction & Investment; Nindya Karya
- Construction start: August 19, 2016
- Construction cost: Rp804 billion
- Inaugurated: October 22, 2020

Kendari Bay Bridge is a cable-stayed bridge located in Kendari, Southeast Sulawesi, Indonesia. It spans Kendari Bay, connecting Kendari District with Abeli District on the south side of the bay. This bridge was constructed by the state-owned companies PP Construction & Investment and Nindya Karya, and was inaugurated by President Joko Widodo on October 22, 2020. The bridge is claimed to reduce travel time from the Old Town area of Kendari on the north side to the southern areas of Kendari, such as Port of Bungkutoko and Poasia District, from approximately 25–30 minutes to 3–5 minutes.

== History ==
Before this bridge existed, residents had to travel around Kendari Bay from Kendari District on the north side (historically part of the Old Town area) to Abeli District on the south side, and vice versa. The only shortcut was by using a boat taxi service called "papalimbang". The Kendari Bay Bridge was initiated by Southeast Sulawesi Governor Nur Alam during his second term from 2008 to 2017, with the motto "Building Community Welfare" (Bahteramas). The construction of the bridge began with a groundbreaking ceremony on August 19, 2016. PP Construction & Investment and Nindya Karya served as the contractors, under the responsibility of the National Road Implementation Center XXI Kendari, Directorate General of Highways, Ministry of Public Works and Housing. The construction cost, sourced from the state budget (APBN), amounted to IDR 804 billion through a multi-year contract scheme from 2015 to 2020.

== Design ==
The Kendari Bay Bridge is located on the shortest side of Kendari Bay, the eastern side. The bridge comprises an approach road of 602.5 meters, an approach span of 357.7 meters, a side span of 180 meters, and a main span of 200 meters. The bridge's width is 20 meters, featuring four traffic lanes, a median, and sidewalks. With a total length of 1,348 meters (approximately 1.35 kilometers), this bridge is the third longest sea-crossing bridge in Indonesia, following the Bali Mandara Toll Road in Bali (12.7 kilometers) and the Suramadu Bridge in East Java (5.4 kilometers), surpassing the Merah Putih Bridge in Maluku (1.1 kilometers).

Each pillar of the bridge bears the inscriptions "Indonesia Maju" (Onward Indonesia), "Jembatan Teluk Kendari" (Kendari Bay Bridge), and "Sulawesi Selatan" (Southeast Sulawesi). "Indonesia Maju" refers to the name and slogan of President Joko Widodo's second administration, while the other inscriptions identify the bridge and its location. Additionally, each pillar features logos of the Ministry of Public Works and Housing, the province of Southeast Sulawesi, and the two contractors.
