= Balang Island Bridge =

Balang Island Bridge Jembatan Pulau Balang
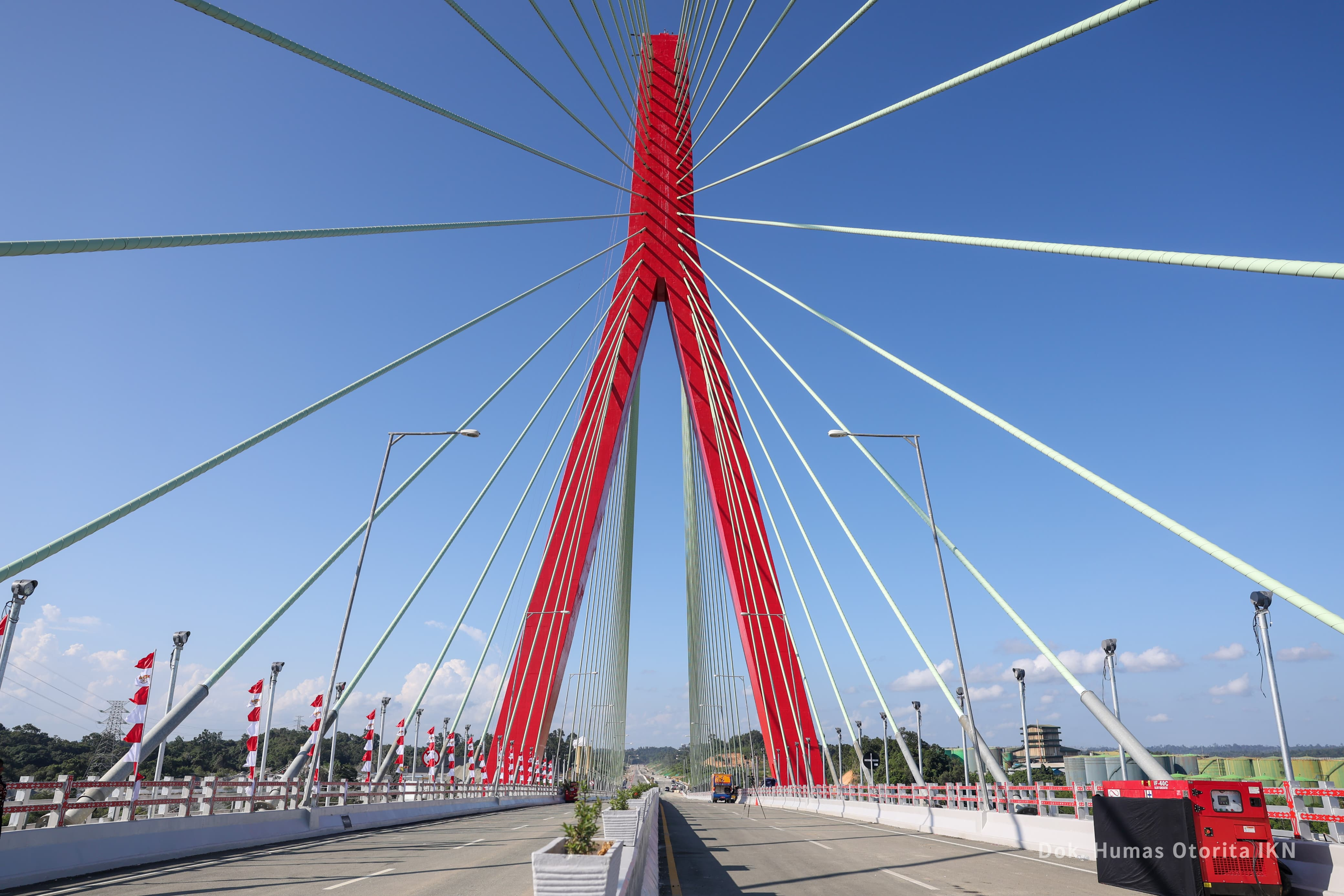
- Coordinates: 1°6′37.15″S 116°43′49.51″E
- Crosses: Balikpapan Bay
- Locale: East Kalimantan, Indonesia

Characteristics
- Total length: 1,750 m (5,740 ft)

Location
- Interactive map of Balang Island Bridge

The Balang Island Bridge (Indonesian: Jembatan Pulau Balang) is a bridge that connects the city of Balikpapan to the Penajam North Paser Regency, in the East Kalimantan province of Indonesia.

== Short span bridge ==
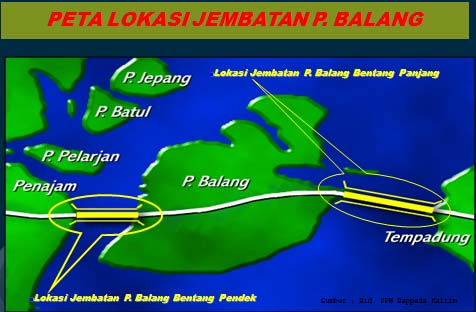
Location of the short span bridge on Balang Island

In addition to the bridge that was inaugurated by President Joko Widodo at the end of July 2024, there is a short-span bridge (470 m long) which is located on the west side of Balang Island and connects it to the nearby Nusantara International Airport. The budget from the APBN for the short span arch bridge design guidelines or independent proof check (IPC) in Pantai Lango Village, Penajam District, North Penajam Paser Regency (PPU) was recorded at IDR 2.1 billion and the physical construction budget was estimated at IDR 331.88 billion.

== Controversies ==
However, the construction of the Balang Island Bridge which connects the city of Balikpapan to the Penajam Paser Utara (PPU) was considered less efficient. In addition, the bridge built by the East Kalimantan Provincial Government is considered to threaten the Sungai Wain Protected Forest (HLSW) area.
