= Kota Intan Bridge =

Bridge in Jakarta, Indonesia

Coordinates: 6.1312475°S 106.81054449999999°E

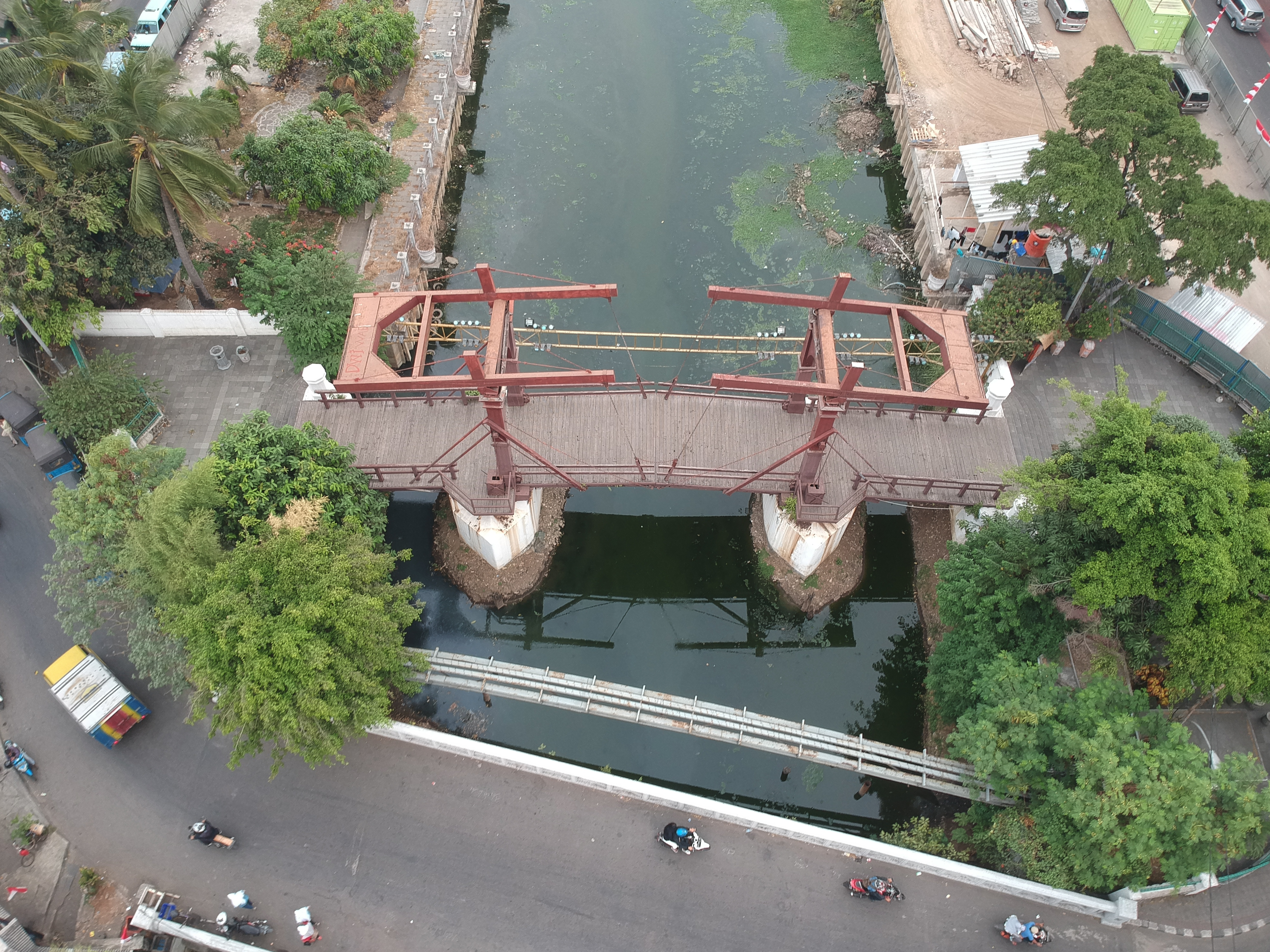
Kota Intan Bridge at present

Kota Intan Bridge (Indonesian: Jembatan Kota Intan) is a hanging bridge located at Kali Besar of Kota Tua in Jakarta. It is the oldest bridge in Indonesia that was built in 1628 by the Dutch East India Company. Now the bridge is under the management of the Jakarta Provincial Tourism and Culture Department. The bridge is also known as jembatan gantung or hanging bridge. In the past, it operated as a Bascule bridge. The double “leaf” of the bridge would swing upward to provide clearance for marine traffic during the colonial era.

== History ==
The name of present day Kota Intan Bridge has changed from time to time. At first this bridge was called Engelse Brug or "English Bridge" as there was a stronghold of British troops to the east of the bridge during construction period. In the years 1628-1629 the bridge was damaged due to the attack of Banten and Mataram troops. It was rebuilt in 1630 and changed its name to "Chicken Market Bridge" or Hoenderpasarbrug, because across the bridge there was a chicken market, for the residents of Batavia. Subsequently in 1655 this bridge was repaired again after the old wooden bridge was destroyed during the flood and was given the name De Middelpunt Brug or "The Central Bridge". The shape and style of the bridge hasn't changed until now. During the heyday of Queen Juliana, the bridge was renamed the Queen Juliana Bridge, as it was repaired by the queen.

After the Proclamation of Indonesian Independence the bridge was renamed as Jembatan Kota Intan in accordance with the name of the local location, where in the early stages of its construction it was located right at the end of the Diamond bastion of Batavia Castle. The bridge was revitalized before 2018 Asian Games, which was held in Jakarta.
