= Tayan Bridge =

Tayan Bridge Jembatan Tayan
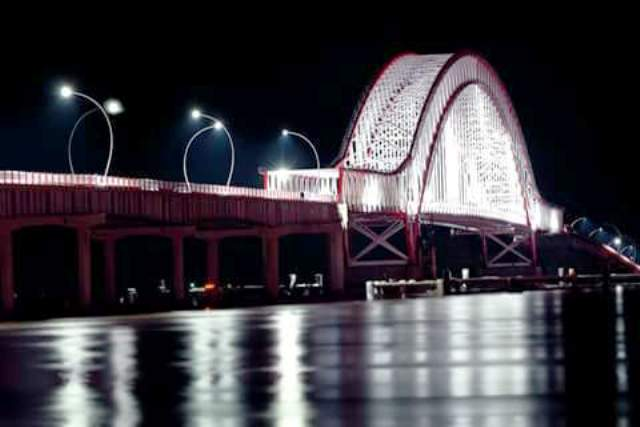
- Tayan Bridge at night
- Coordinates: 0.0481°S 110.1080°E
- Carries: 3 lanes of AH150 Trans-Kalimantan Highway Southern Route
- Crosses: Kapuas River
- Locale: Sanggau Regency, West Kalimantan, Indonesia

Characteristics
- Design: Truss arch bridge
- Total length: total: 1,975 m (6,480 ft); 300 m (984 ft) (Tayan to Tayan Island); 1,140 m (3,740 ft) (Tayan Island to Piasak)
- Width: 11 m (36 ft)
- Longest span: 200 m (660 ft)
- Clearance below: 13 m (43 ft)

History
- Construction start: September 2012
- Construction end: 19 February 2016
- Construction cost: Rp 740 billion
- Opened: 22 March 2016; 9 years ago

Tayan Bridge (Indonesian: Jembatan Tayan) is a bridge that crosses Kapuas River in Sanggau, West Kalimantan, Indonesia. This bridge is a part of the Trans-Kalimantan Highway (southern route) that connects West Borneo with Central Borneo. The bridge is one of the longest bridges in Borneo. Construction of the bridge took around 900 days, and it opened to traffic on 22 March 2016.

== History ==
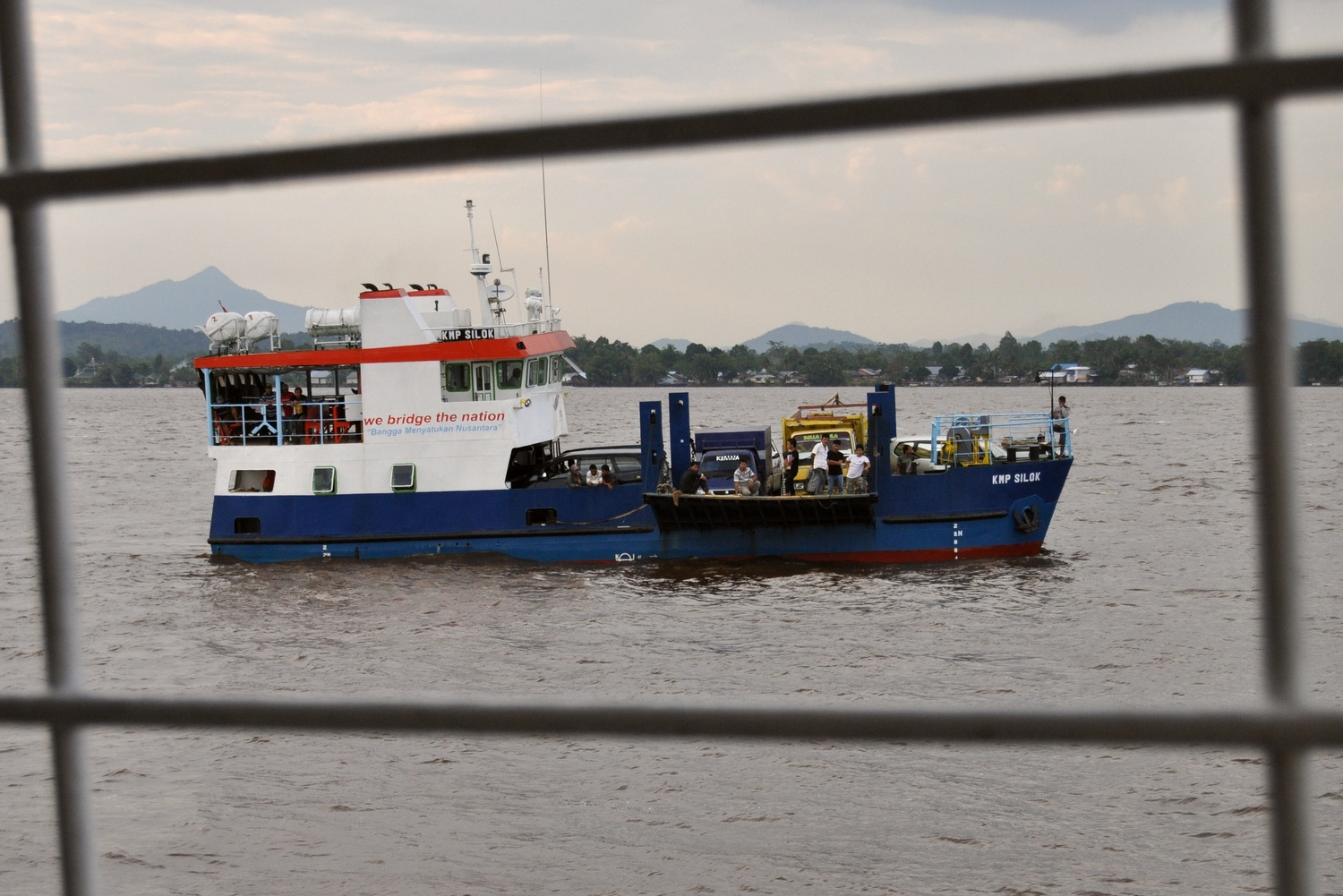
One of two ferries which connected Tayan and Piasak

Before the bridge was completed, vehicle crossing between Tayan and Piasak was served by two small ferries. It required 20 minutes to cross the river by ferry.

=== Construction ===
Construction of the bridge started in September 2012. The construction project was mainly funded by a loan from China (90%) and was built by China Road and Bridge Corporation. The bridge costed 740 billion rupiahs. The bridge was finished on 19 February 2016.

The bridge was inaugurated by President of Indonesia, Joko Widodo, and opened on 22 March 2016.

== Description ==
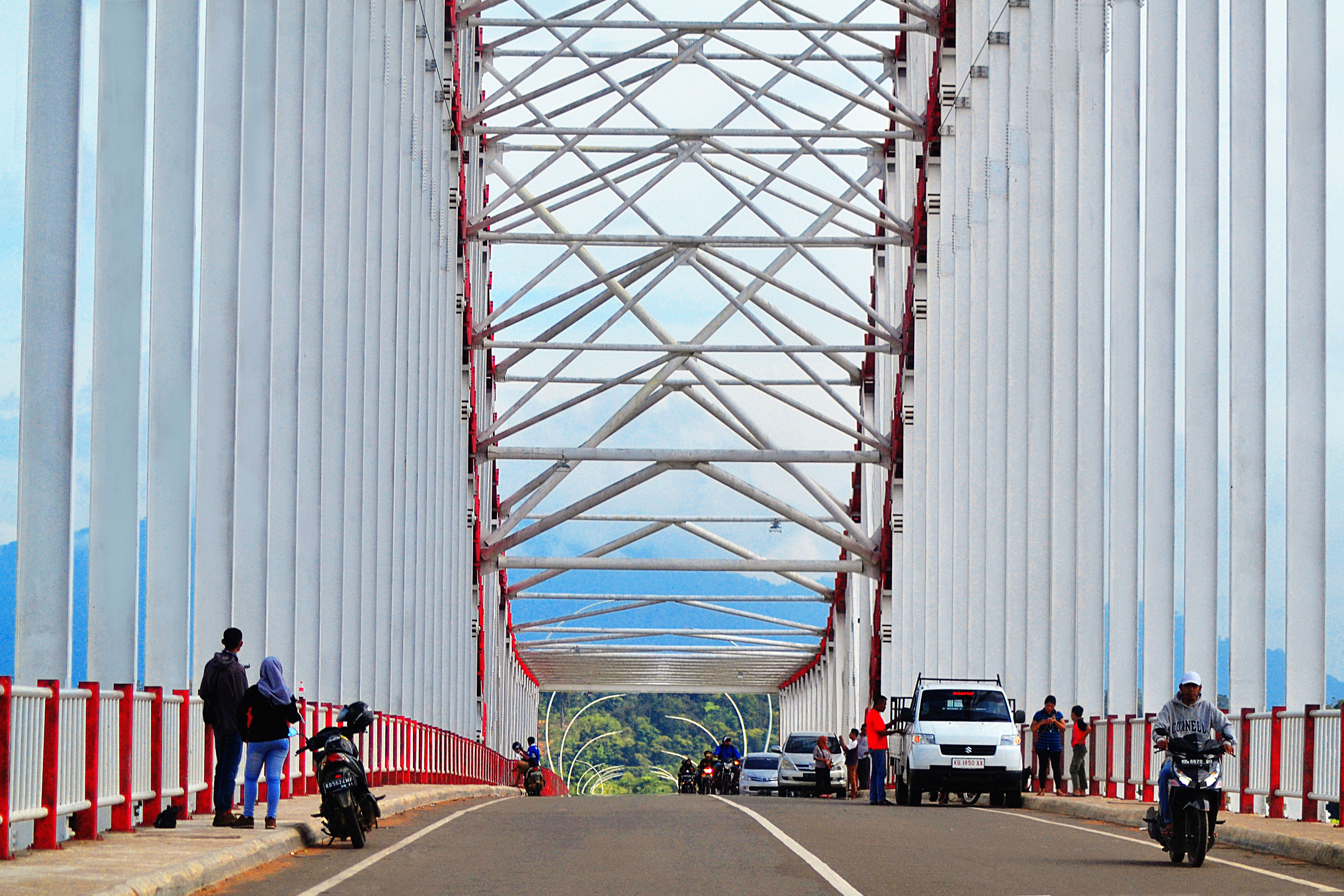
Trans-Kalimantan Highway in Tayan Bridge

The total length of this bridge is 1,975 meters while the width is about 11 meters. The bridge has 1 lane in each direction. The clearance of the bridge from the surface of river at the high water condition is 13 meters.

The construction of the bridge was divided into two parts. The first part was a 300 meters bridge from Tayan town to Tayan Island, and the second part was a 1,140 meters bridge from Tayan Island to Piasak. The bridge is expected to last for 100 years with maintenance.
