= Barito Bridge =

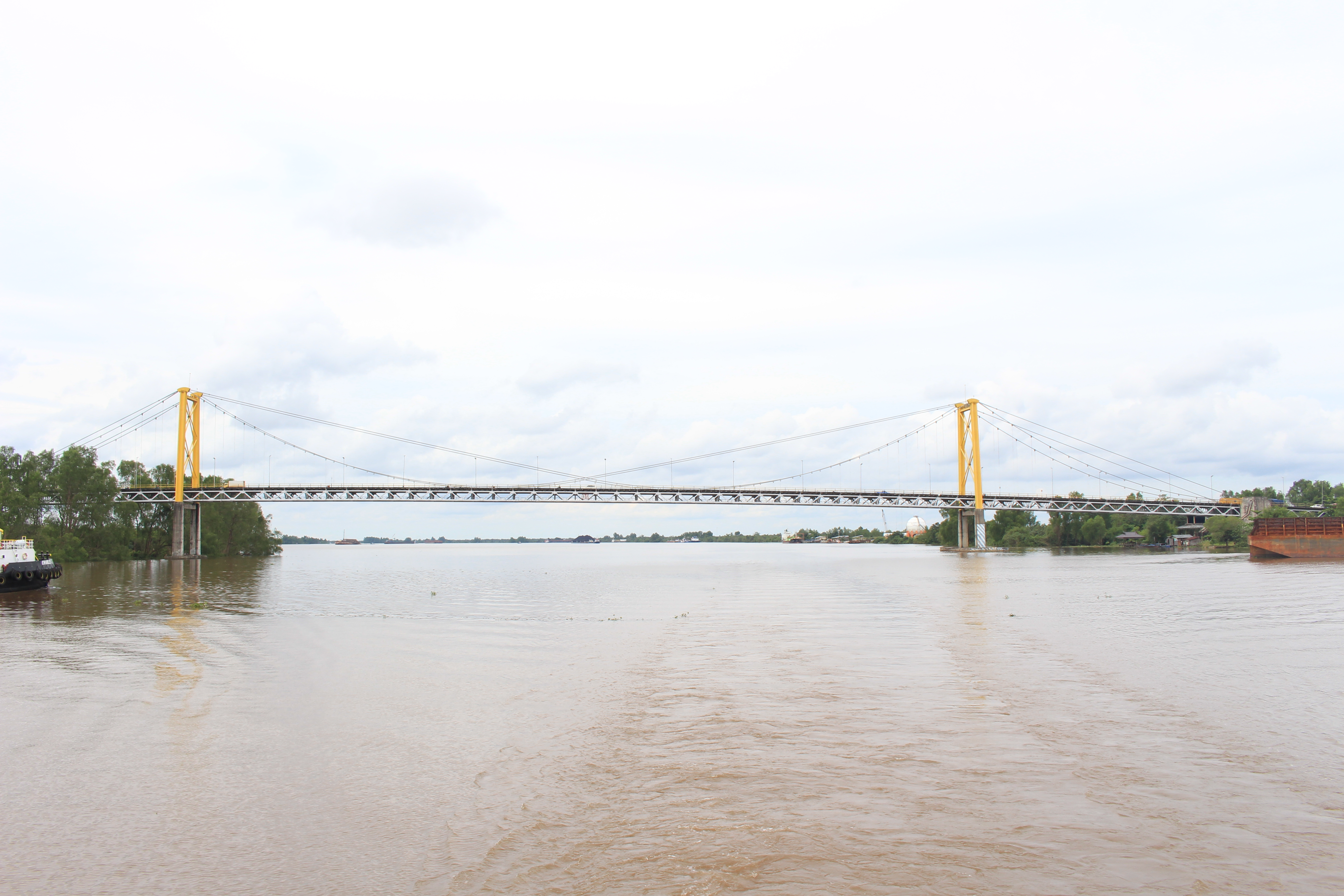
- Coordinates: 3°12′57″S 114°33′33″E
- Carries: Trans-Kalimantan Highway Southern Route
- Crosses: Barito River
- Locale: Barito Kuala Regency, South Kalimantan

History
- Construction start: early 1993
- Opened: 24 April 1997

The Barito Bridge (Jembatan Barito) is a 3,506 feet (1.07 kilometers) long, single decked, multi-span suspension bridge in South Kalimantan, Indonesia that spans the Barito River. It is the longest suspension bridge in Indonesia and a major tourist attraction. The bridge serves as the direct link between the rural communities of Central Kalimantan to the urban center of Banjarmasin.

== History ==
Construction of the bridge began in 1994. It was completed 4 years later in 1997. It was inaugurated by Indonesia's second president, Suharto. The bridge is still in use as of 2022, and remains the longest suspension bridge in Indonesia, a record that was noted in the Museum Rekor Indonesia.

== Geography ==
The bridge is located in South Kalimantan province, in Barito Kuala Regency, on the island of Borneo in the Indonesian Archipelago. It carries the Trans-Kalimantan Highway Southern Route across the Barito River and Bakut Island about 22.6 miles (36.4 kilometers) north of where the river empties into the Java Sea.

== Structure ==
The bridge has three main spans across the Barito River and Bakut Island, with a total length of 3,506 feet (1.069 kilometers). The main span is 787.4 feet (240.0 meters) long. The piers are made of reinforced concrete, and the pylons and deck truss are made of steel, fabricated in Australia and then shipped to the site. The bridge is one of the only in the world to use a dual asymmetric cable arrangement.

== Tourism ==
Being Indonesia's longest suspension bridge, it is an important tourist attraction in the region. There is also significant tourism demand on Bakut Island under the bridge, where proboscis monkeys can be seen.

=== Future ===
The government of Barito Kuala Regency has invested significant money into further popularizing the bridge and its surrounding area as a destination. There are plans to build Barito Regions Park, the proposed model featuring a family amusement park and onsite hotel.
