= Kendari =

Capital and largest city of Southeast Sulawesi, Indonesia

- City
- City of Kendari; Kota Kendari
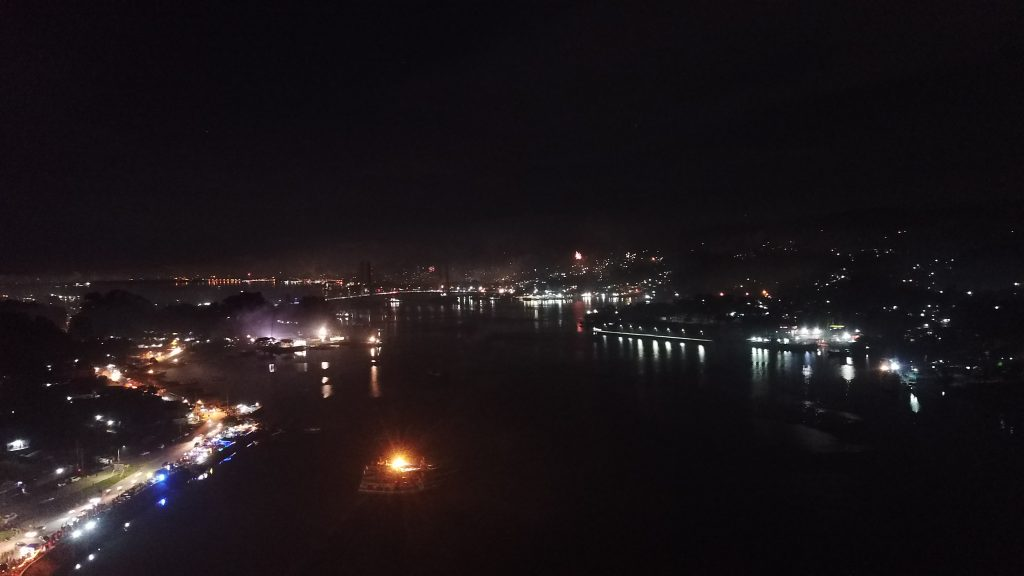
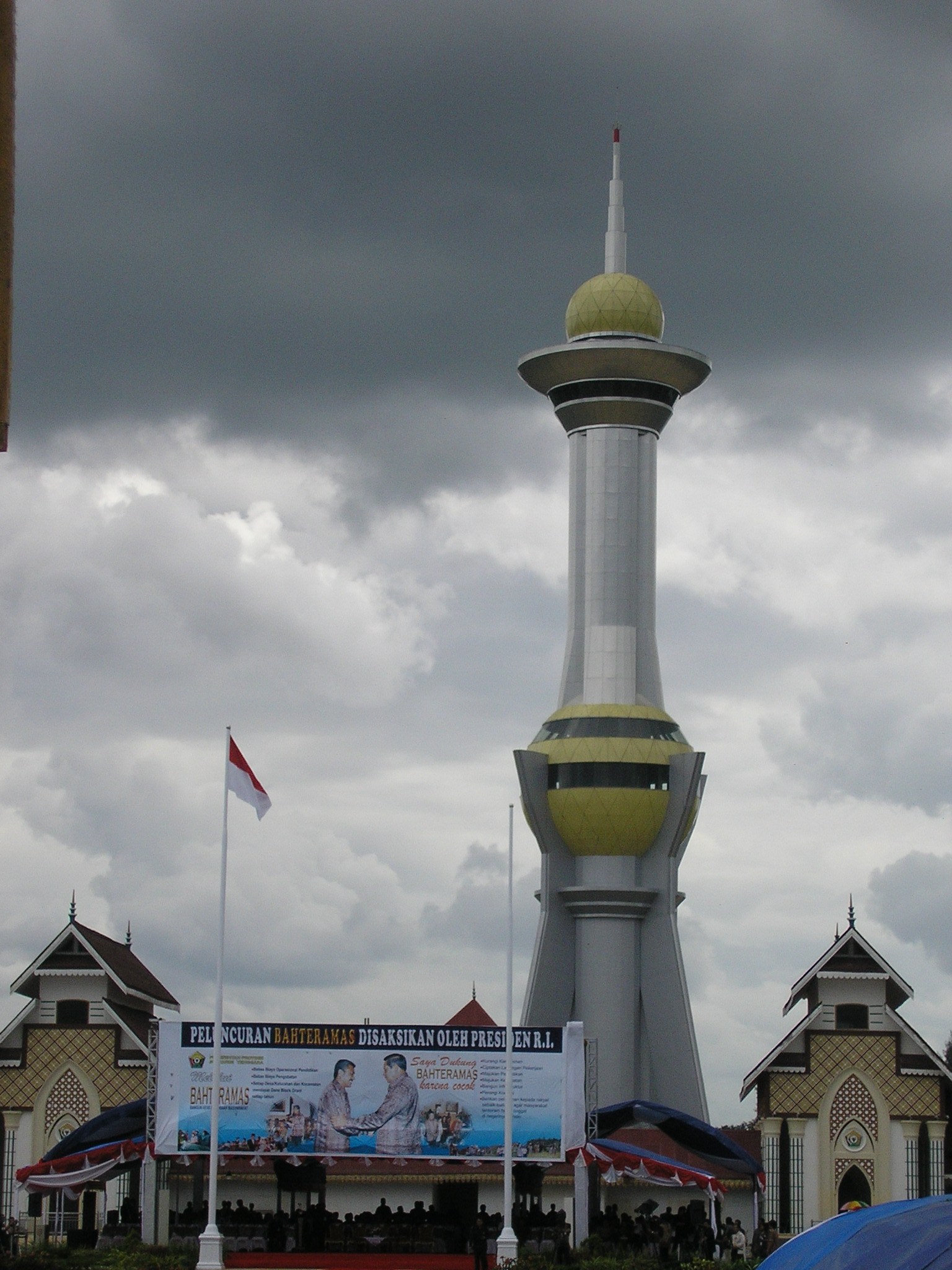
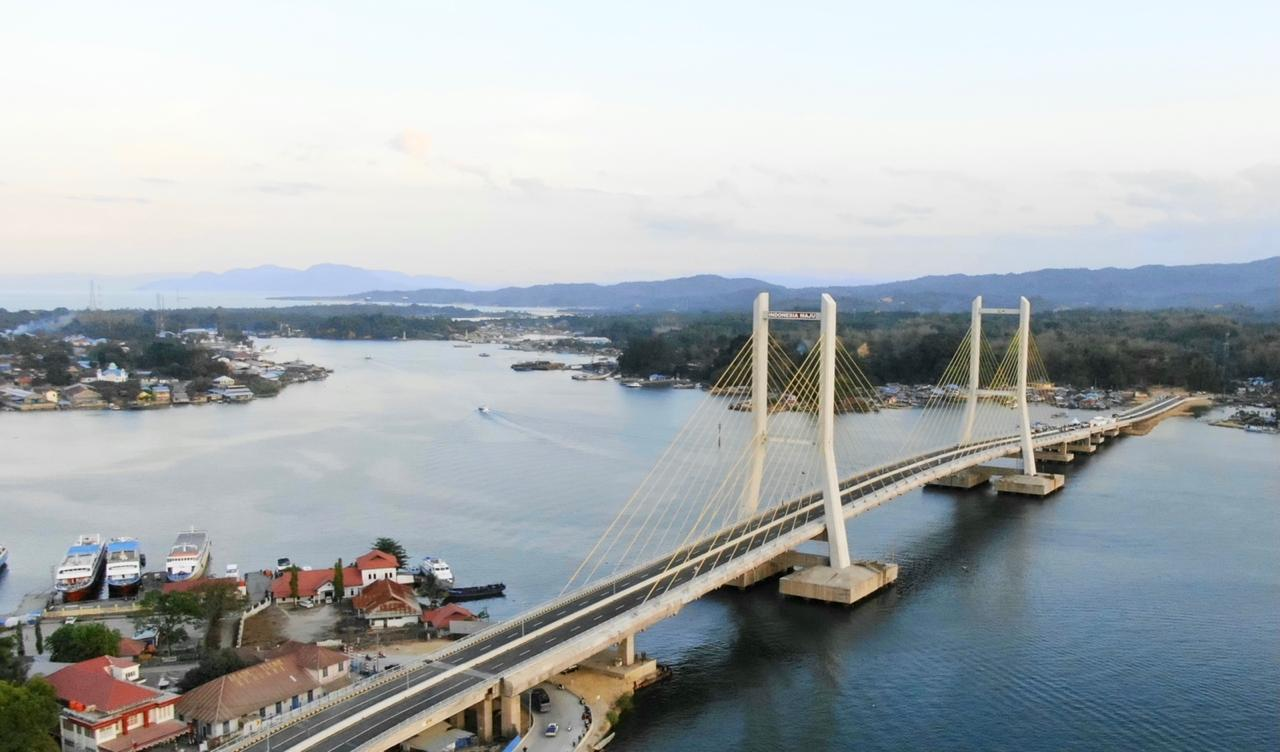
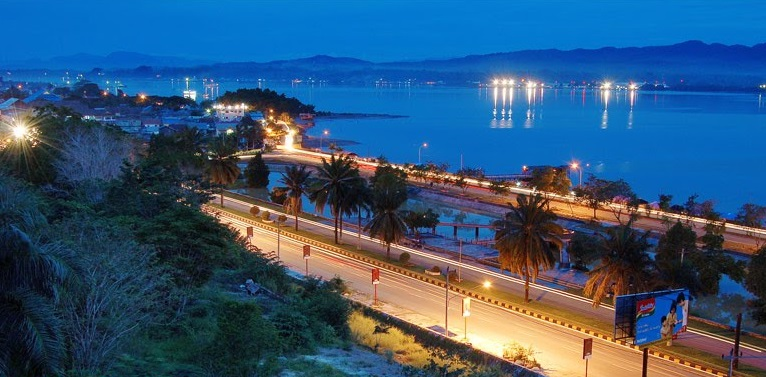
- Kendari at night MTQ Unity Monument Kendari Bay Bridge Al-Alam Mosque Kendari at night

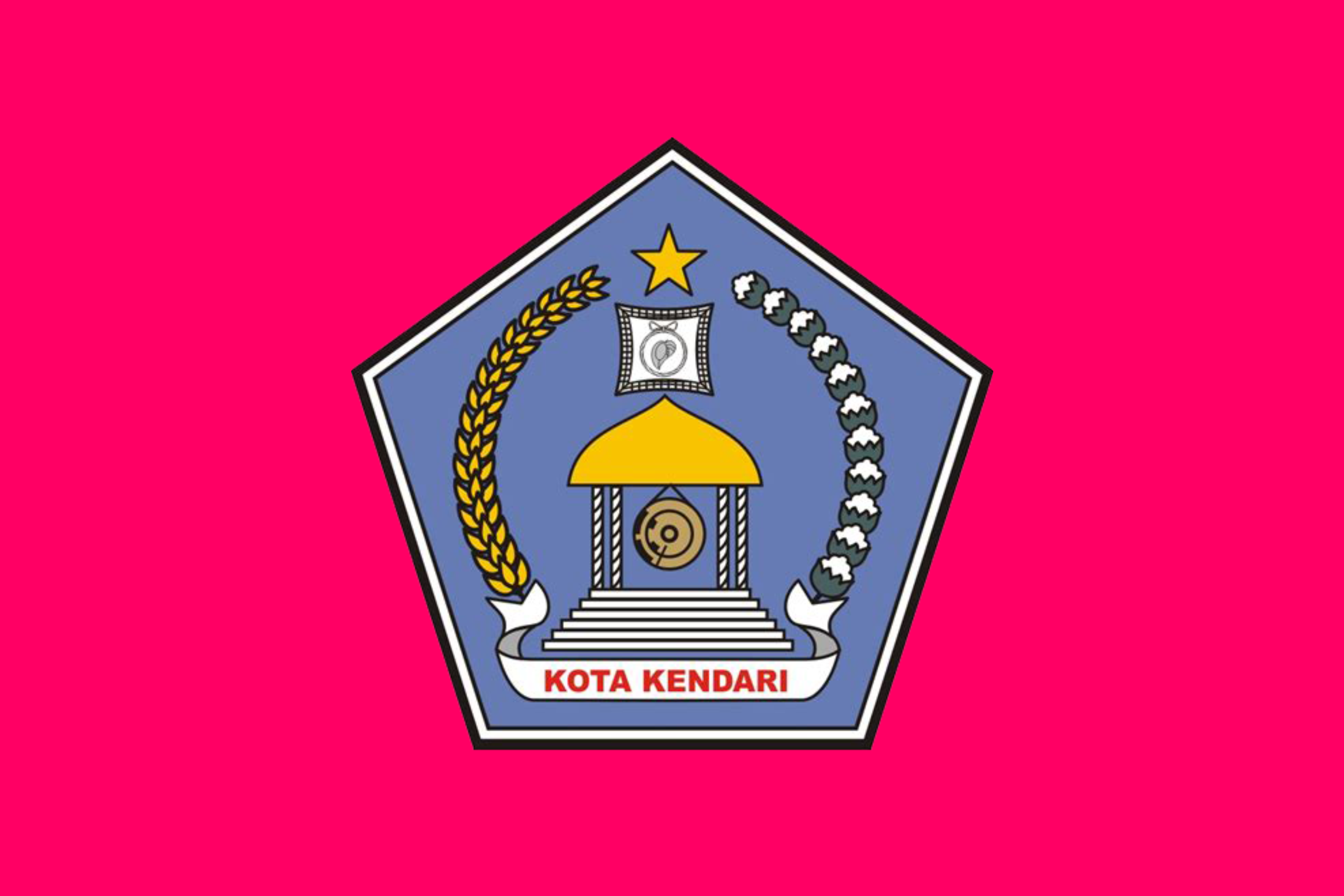
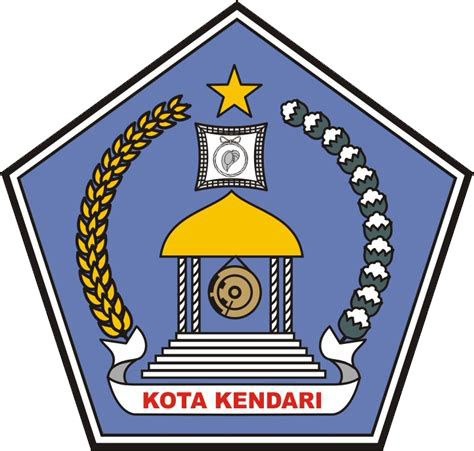
- Flag Coat of arms

- Location within Southeast Sulawesi
- Interactive map of Kendari
- Location in Sulawesi and Indonesia Kendari (Indonesia)
- Coordinates: 3.9907°S 122.5086°E
- Country: Indonesia
- Province: Southeast Sulawesi
- Founded: 9 May 1831
- Incorporated: 1 July 1978
- City Status: 3 August 1995

Government
  - Mayor: Siska Karina Imran (NasDem)
  - Vice Mayor: Sudirman
  - Legislature: Kendari City Regional House of Representatives

Area
  - Total: 270.14 km^{2} (104.30 sq mi)

Population (mid 2025)
  - Total: 375,829
  - Density: 1,391.2/km^{2} (3,603.3/sq mi)
- Time zone: UTC+8 (Indonesia Central Time)
- Area code: (+62) 401
- HDI (2024): ▲0.855 (5th) very high
- Website: kendarikota.go.id

Kendari is the capital city of the Indonesian province of Southeast Sulawesi. It had a population of 289,966 at the 2010 Census and 345,107 at the 2020 census, making it the most populous city in the province, and the fourth most on Sulawesi. The official estimate as at mid 2025 was 375,829 (comprising 188,853 males and 186,976 females). The city covers an area of 270.14 square kilometers (104.30 sq mi), or about 0.7 percent of Southeast Sulawesi's land area. Located on Kendari Bay, it continues to be an important trade center, with the province's main port and airport. It is the economic and educational center of the province, home to various universities and colleges. Kendari has the highest Human Development Index (HDI) in Sulawesi.

== History ==
=== Etymology ===
The word "Kendari" is thought to come from a version of the word "Kandai", meaning a tool made of bamboo and wooden planks to push boats away from a dock. Over time, the pronunciation changed, and the city is now officially known as Kendari.

=== Early history ===
The Bay of Kendari has been known since the 15th century and appears on Portuguese chartered maps, marked with the name "Citta dela Baia" ("City of the Bay"). The bay was known as "Baia du Tivora" ("Tivora Bay"). The Konawe Kingdom, founded in the fifth century by the Tolaki people, ruled the settlement. Its early governmental structure was simple and resembled those of tribal societies. The kingdom had several historical periods.

Its first king was Mokole Roro, who ruled the kingdom between 428 and 447, in a period known as Ancient Konawe. The kingdom was still small and did not yet rule all of today's Konawe region or Kendari city. The kingdom's capital was in Rahambuu, a town known today as Unaaha, around 60 kilometers (37 mi) from Kendari. The kingdom included three smaller kingdoms loyal to Unaaha.

The Old Konawe period followed the Ancient Konawe period. It was marked by the unification and consolidation of the kingdom's power over the region. There was a huge unknown disaster, which is thought to have almost eliminated all the people in the region. According to local legend, Onggodo, a holy man, is thought to have arrived in the kingdom from the Maluku Islands. He is believed to have saved the kingdom from the unknown disaster, and later married one of the kingdom's princesses. Konawe society was divided into three classes. Anakia were nobles and the upper classes; Tononggapa were the commoners and peasants, and Oata were slaves. People in the region were united by the Kalo Sara, meaning "circle of tribal laws", a religious symbol of harmony, peace, and kinship, a large bracelet made of three rattan pieces tied together on a white napkin. The rattan bracelet symbolized unity and the white napkin symbolized good deeds. The three pieces of rattan have various meanings and interpretations, such as father, mother, and children, or government, religion, and tradition.

=== Islamic period ===
Islam has been present in the kingdom since the early 15th century, especially after the foundation of the neighbouring Sultanate of Buton, just south of Konawe, brought by Buginese merchants from Makassar who mostly settled in coastal regions, and through trade. The kingdom officially embraced Islam during the reign of King Lakidende (1724–1786), who had embraced Islam after traveling around Western parts of Sulawesi and studying Islam in the Bone kingdom around today's South Sulawesi. During his reign, the kingdom banned things that were considered un-Islamic, such as eating pork. He promoted the construction of mosques in each village, and marriage in accordance with Islamic tradition. The kingdom's governance structure did not change significantly, and many animist traditions were incorporated with Islamic beliefs by the people. The Kalo Sara symbol was interpreted in accordance with Islamic beliefs instead of being abandoned altogether. During this period, Konawe became a multicultural society, with merchants from Java, Makassar, and Maluku settling on the island.

=== Colonial period ===
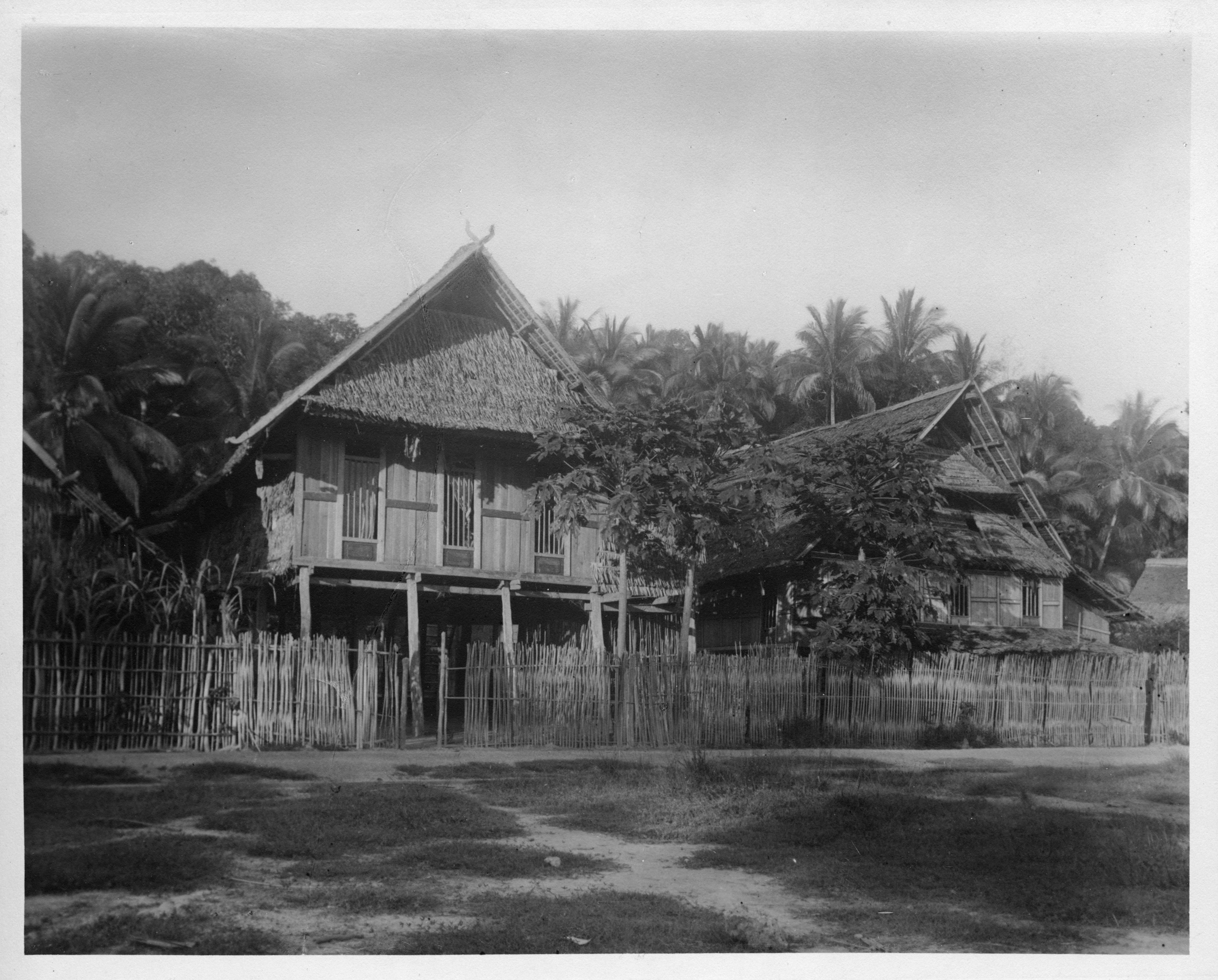
A house in Kendari, 1920

In 1828, the governor of the Dutch East Indies tasked a sailor named Jacques Nicholas Vosmaer with mapping the eastern coast of Sulawesi to find a suitable location for a trading post. The first detailed map of Kendari Bay, renamed Vosmaer Bay in his honor, was published in May 1831. According to reports from Vosmaer in 1839 and another Dutch official named van der Hart in 1853, villages around Kendari Bay where current city is located are settled by Bugis and Bajo traders and fisherman between 10 and 15 years prior to his journey. The bay was an attractive location for migrants that time, due to Konawe's political condition that were relatively stable and peaceful compared to neighbouring kingdoms at that time. Many traders, especially those of the Bugis people, came to Kendari due to the ongoing Dutch–Bone War between 1824 and 1825. During this time, Konawe was in a weakened state following a succession of crises. In 1858, La Mangu, a noble from Ranome Eto, signed a treaty with the Dutch, as he wished to create a separate kingdom, Laiwoi, independent from Konawe. Laiwoi would be located in Ranome Eto, and its founding was kept secret from Konawe royal council members. Laiwoi existed legally, but did not control any territory, as Konawe maintained its hold on the area. The Dutch promised armed help to create the kingdom on the condition that the treaty would be kept secret from the people of Konawe until the other Dutch wars in South Sulawesi ended.

In 1905, following the end of the war against the Gowa Sultanate, the Dutch turned their attention to the eastern coast of Sulawesi. La Mangu had died by now, but the Dutch maintained the plans to establish Laiwoi, approaching nobles from Ranome Eto with the treaty and finally, naming Saosao as king, increasing tensions with the Konawe nobility. To avoid armed conflict, the Dutch government mediated an agreement. However, Konawe secretly mobilised its troops and established an arms store in Puwilalo. In response, the Dutch attempted, and failed, to negotiate with their leader, Watukila. Finally, the Dutch decided to attack Watukila's troops and invaded the kingdom. In 1908, Dutch troops besieged Puundombi Fort, and Konawe fell. Laiwoi moved the capital to Kendari; armed resistance to it and the Dutch continued through 1937.

=== Japanese occupation and independence ===
Japanese troops occupied the city after the Battle of Kendari in 1942. The Dutch garrison initially opted for guerilla warfare, but following increased Indonesian nationalist sentiment, and the lack of resistance that followed, the Dutch command ultimately pressed for surrender, which they did on 27 March. As in other regions, Japanese troops provided opportunities for Indonesian nationalism to spread in the region, and gave nationalist groups military training.^{:60}

One month after the Proclamation of Indonesian Independence in August 1945, youth in the region created a militia headquartered in Kolaka. The PRI (Indonesian Republican Youth) controlled the militia and spread its influence to cities and towns in Southeast Sulawesi, including Kendari. Lasandara, a local administrator for the Dutch, officially supported independence. However, in October, Australian troops entered the region with the Netherlands Indies Civil Administration. On 19 November, a Republican militia clashed with Dutch troops in an event known as the Kolaka incident. In February 1946, Dutch troops occupied the large cities in the region; guerilla resistance by the Republicans continued until 1948. The city and the surrounding region became part of the State of East Indonesia, which was incorporated into the newly recognised Indonesian Republic a year later. The city was heavily affected by the Darul Islam rebellion, which started in South Sulawesi but spread to the eastern coast. Because of the conflict, there were several refugee camps around the city. In 1964, the new province of Southeast Sulawesi was created with Kendari as its capital city. In 1978, Kendari gained city status as an administrative city and in 1995 as a kotamadya.

Due to its status as provincial capital, Kendari has been experiencing significant urbanization, making it prone to flooding and other disasters.

== Geography ==
Kendari borders the Konawe Regency in the north, South Konawe Regency in the south and west, and Kendari Bay (an inlet from the Banda Sea) in the east. The city is on the southeastern part of mainland Sulawesi island; several smaller islands around Kendari Bay are within its boundaries. The city's topography varies from flat to hilly. Coastal areas tend to be flatter, while the northern part of the city is part of the Nipa-Nipa mountain formation, which reaches elevations of approximately 450 metres (1,480 ft). In general, the city's slopes are less than 25 percent except for those in the north, which in some places exceed 40 percent.

Soil formations in the city are relatively young, dominated by cambisols, which make up around 30 percent of the city's soil. Other formations also exist with less frequency, such as alluvium and podzols, which account for less than eight percent overall. Rivers and coastal areas contain the most abundant alluvium sediments.

=== Climate ===
Kendari has a tropical rainforest climate (Köppen Af) with heavy rainfall from December to July and moderate rainfall from August to November. The city's average maximum temperature is 31 °C (88 °F).

The lowest average minimum temperature is usually recorded in August and can be as low as 21 °C (70 °F), while the highest average maximum temperature is observed during November: reaching over 32 °C (90 °F). The average humidity level is between 81 and 87 percent regardless of the month, and wind speed on average sits between 6.8 knots (12.6 km/h; 7.8 mph) and 7.5 knots (13.9 km/h; 8.6 mph) with stronger winds observed in December.

Climate data for Kendari
Month	Jan	Feb	Mar	Apr	May	Jun	Jul	Aug	Sep	Oct	Nov	Dec	Year
Mean daily maximum °C (°F)	31.5 (88.7)	31.4 (88.5)	31.4 (88.5)	31.2 (88.2)	30.6 (87.1)	29.8 (85.6)	29.4 (84.9)	30.2 (86.4)	31.2 (88.2)	32.4 (90.3)	32.6 (90.7)	31.9 (89.4)	31.1 (88.0)
Daily mean °C (°F)	27.5 (81.5)	27.5 (81.5)	27.5 (81.5)	27.4 (81.3)	27.2 (81.0)	26.5 (79.7)	25.9 (78.6)	26.2 (79.2)	26.8 (80.2)	27.6 (81.7)	28.2 (82.8)	27.8 (82.0)	27.2 (80.9)
Mean daily minimum °C (°F)	23.6 (74.5)	23.6 (74.5)	23.6 (74.5)	23.7 (74.7)	23.8 (74.8)	23.2 (73.8)	22.5 (72.5)	22.3 (72.1)	22.5 (72.5)	22.9 (73.2)	23.8 (74.8)	23.8 (74.8)	23.3 (73.9)
Average rainfall mm (inches)	196 (7.7)	207 (8.1)	242 (9.5)	225 (8.9)	241 (9.5)	224 (8.8)	144 (5.7)	91 (3.6)	103 (4.1)	80 (3.1)	98 (3.9)	181 (7.1)	2,032 (80)

== Governance ==
=== Administrative districts ===
At the time of the 2010 census, the city was divided into ten districts (kecamatan), but an 11th district (Nambo) was subsequently created from part of Abeli District. All districts are tabulated below with their postcodes, areas and populations at the 2010 census and the 2020 census, together with the official estimates as at mid 2025. The table also includes the locations of the district administrative centres, the number of urban subdistricts (kelurahan) in each district, and its post codes.

Kode Wilayah	Name of District (kecamatan)	Area in km^{2}	Pop'n census 2010	Pop'n census 2020	Pop'n estimate mid 2025	Admin centre	No. of villages	Post Codes
74.71.01	Mandonga	23.63	36,163	37,220	37,798	Wawombalata	6	93111 - 93113
74.71.03	Baruga	44.38	19,368	33,290	42,973	Watubangga	4	93116
74.71.09	Puuwatu	39.88	27,749	40,000	46,619	Puuwatu	6	93114 & 93115
74.71.08	Kadia	6.56	39,244	36,610	37,080	Kadia	5	93117 & 93118
74.71.07	Wua-Wua	11.82	24,407	33,450	35,318	Anawai	4	93117 & 93118
74.71.04	Poasia	37.51	24,977	40,660	47,435	Rahandouna	4	93231 - 93233
74.71.06	Abeli	16.05	22,438	17,190	18,937	Anggalomelai	7	93234 & 93235
74.71.10	Kambu	25.35	27,135	24,720	25,617	Padaleu	4	93231
74.71.11	Nambo	26.44	^{(a)}	11,170	12,946	Nambo	6	93234 - 93238
74.71.02	Kendari	17.27	25,557	28,580	29,401	Kandai	9	93121 - 93129
74.71.05	West Kendari	21.25	42,928	42,230	41,705	Punggaloba	9	93121 - 93127
	Totals	270.14	289,966	345,107	375,829		67	

Note: (a) The 2010 population of the new Nambo District is included in the figure for Abeli District, from which it was later cut out.

The city surrounds Kendari Bay, with the densely-inhabited Kadia District centrally located to the west of the bay, flanked by Mandonga, Puuwatu, Wua-Wua, Barua and Kambu Districts on its northern, westerm and southern sides. Kendari Barat and Kendari Districts lie on the north side of the bay, while Poesia, Abeli and Nambo Districts lie on the south side. Bungkutoku Island is situated in the mouth of the bay.

=== Government and politics ===
As with all Indonesian cities, Kendari is a second-level administrative division, equal in power to a regency, that is run by an elected mayor and vice mayor, who hold executive power, as well as a legislative city parliament. Legislative duties are vested in the local parliament. Heads of districts are appointed by the mayor on the recommendation of the city secretary.

The city is part of the 1st Southeast Sulawesi electoral district, which sends six of the 45 representatives to the provincial parliament. On the city level, it is divided into five electoral districts, which has 35 representatives.

Electoral district	Region	Representatives
Kendari 1st	Mandonga and Puuwatu District	8
Kendari 2nd	Kendari and West Kendari District	7
Kendari 3rd	Abeli, Nambo and Poasia District	6
Kendari 4th	Baruga and Kambu District	6
Kendari 5th	Kadia and Wua-Wua District	8
Total		35

== Economy ==
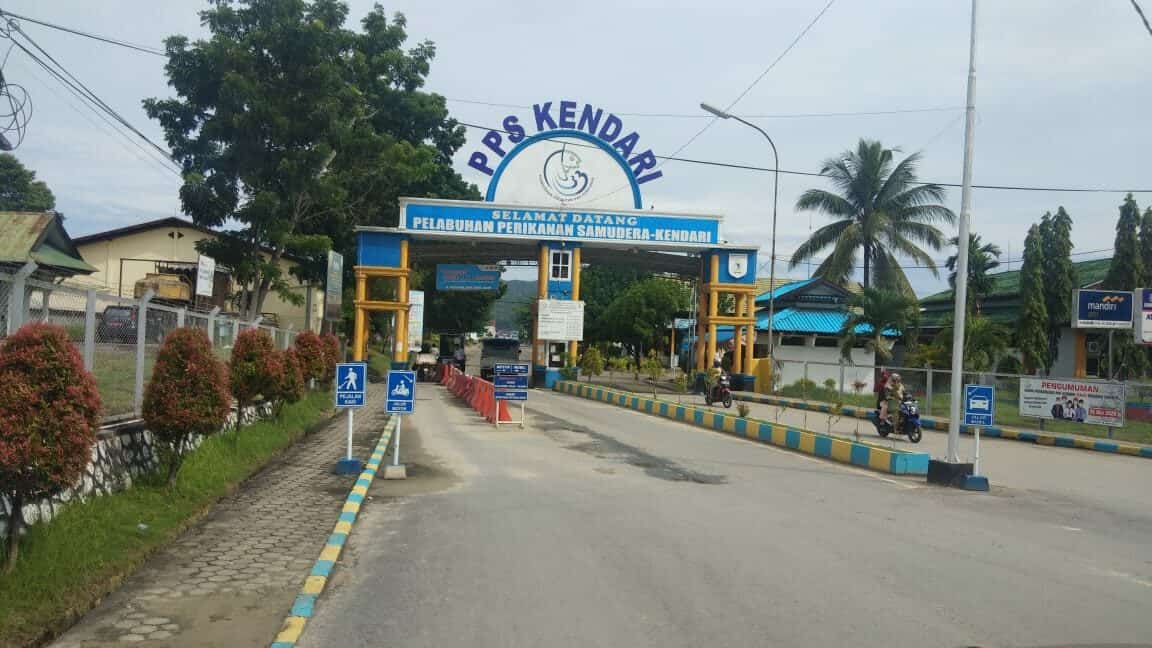
Entrance gate to Samudera Fishery Port

The city's economy consists largely of service-related sectors employing 77 percent of its workforce. The construction sector, retail, agriculture and fisheries, processing and manufacturing, education, logistics and the financial and insurance industries are also major industries, listed here in order of percentage of gross regional product (GRP).

Kendari is also industrial, with the manufacturing sector employing 21.04 percent of the workforce, while agriculture employs 1.34 percent. Overall GRP growth of the city was 6.48 percent in 2019, but then the economy contracted 1.3 percent in 2020 because of the economic effects of the COVID-19 pandemic. The poverty rate in 2020 was 4.34 percent.

The nearby Konawe Industrial Area produces mainly nickel–lithium batteries. Shipping comes to Kendari New Port, a large industrial container port, and the Samudera Fishery Port, which hosts 27 fish processing companies as of 2016 and is among the largest centers for that industry in Eastern Indonesia. The fish catch was around 37,000 metric tons (36,000 long tons; 41,000 short tons) tons in 2018, consisting largely of skipjack tuna. There are 142 hotels registered in the city. Kendari is home to 28 large industrial companies and 446 registered small and medium-sized enterprises employing more than 1,500 people. Agricultural exports include frozen shrimp, processed cashew nuts, cocoa butter, and raw octopus; most of these products are exported to Japan and India.

== Demographics ==
Around 90 percent of Kendari's population are members of groups native to the region such as Tolaki, Muna, Buton, and Moronene; the rest are mostly migrants from other parts of Indonesia. There were 188,853 males and 186,976 females in the city in mid 2025. The population grew by 2.56 percent between 2024 and 2025, with Baruga district growing the most (6 percent) while the West Kendari district decreased the most, losing 0.36 percent of its population. The most densely populated district was the Kadia district with 5,652 people per square kilometre in 2025, while the least was Nambo, with 490. The most populated districts in 2025 were Poasia with 47,435 people and Puuwatu with 46,619 people, while the least populated was Nambo, which has a population of 12,946 people. According to Statistics Indonesia, 278,623 people are considered to be of working age (15 and over) as of 2025. Most of the city's population are Muslim, with considerable Christian, Buddhist, and Hindu minorities.

== Education ==
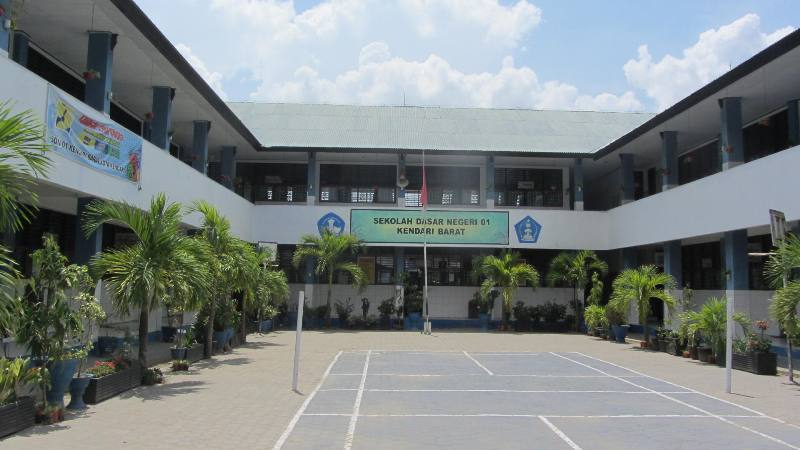
A school in Kendari

There are 133 kindergartens, 141 elementary schools, 58 junior high schools, and 32 senior high schools. There are 20 vocational high schools in the city as of 2020. The city is home to various institutions of higher education, most notably Haluoleo University, which is the older of the two public universities in the province. The university has over 40,000 active students and was the sixth most populous school in Indonesia based on undergraduate population. Kendari State Islamic Institution is the largest Islamic college in the province. It has over 6,000 active students, primarily undergraduates, mainly studying Islamic education and sharia economics.

Construction of the Kendari Modern Library, in Kadia District, was completed in 2021. The library is managed by the provincial government and was modeled after the Harvard Library. The library has seven floors, a cinema room, meeting spaces, an area for local artifacts, and a cafe.

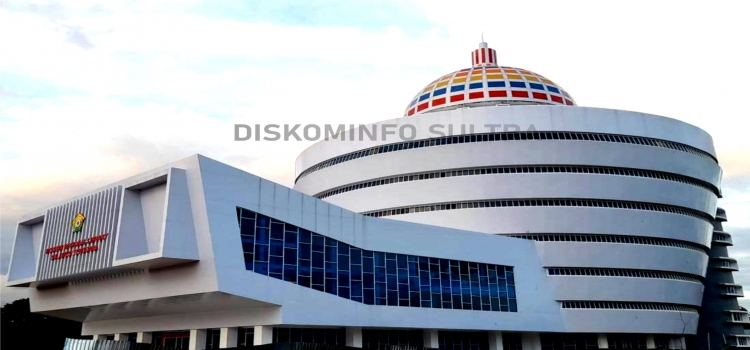
Kendari Modern Library, completed in late 2021

The school participation rate is relatively high—99.44 percent for ages seven to 12 years old, and 94.76 percent for ages 13 to 15. The city reports a literacy rate of 97.94 percent.

== Healthcare ==
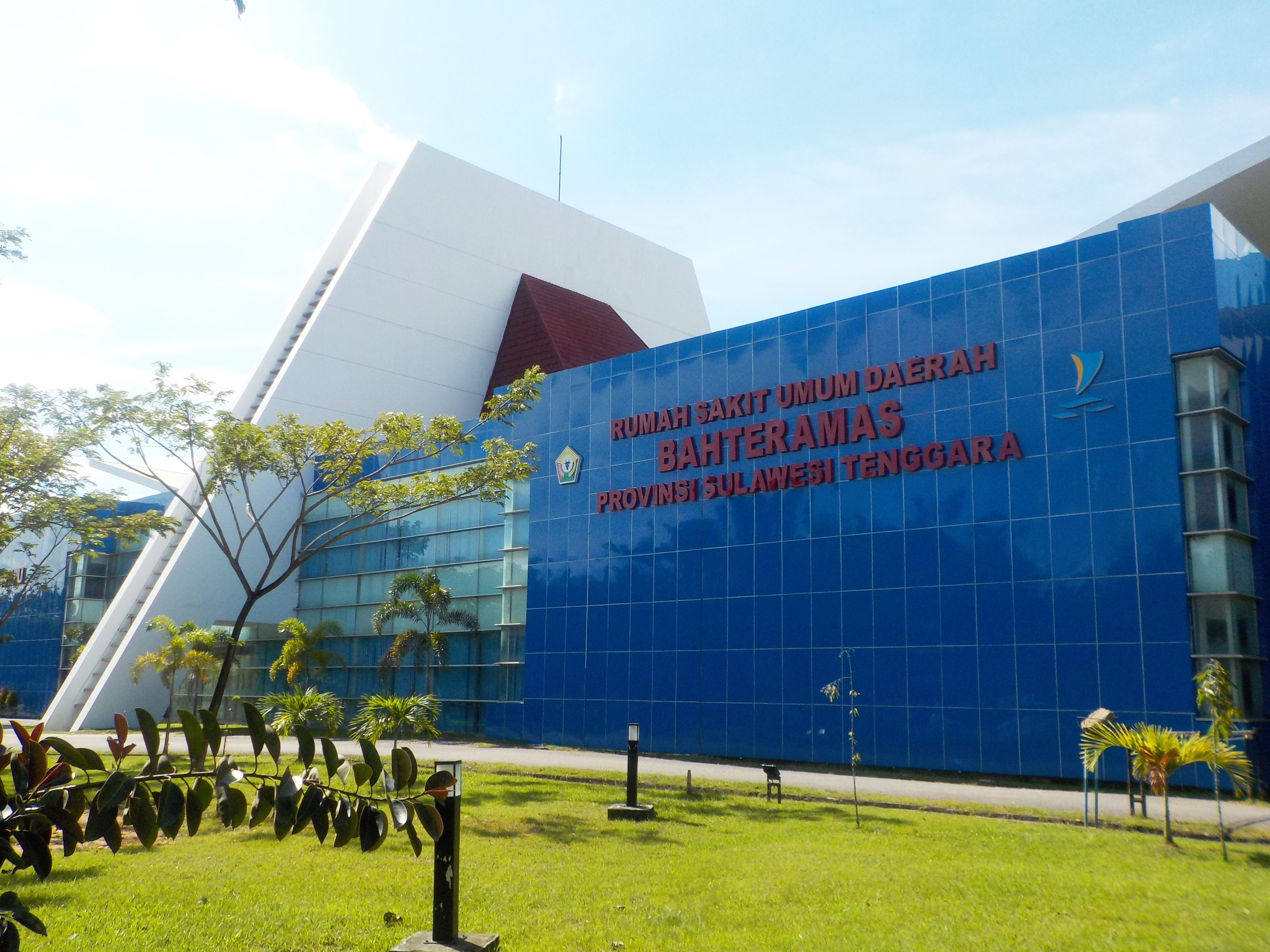
Bahteramas Regional Hospital

As of 2020, the city has 15 hospitals, including a maternity hospital, six polyclinics, 30 puskesmas (community health centers), five of which provide inpatient care, and 40 pharmacies. There are 38 primary clinics, 216 healthcare centers, and 55 family planning clinics in the city. Of the 15 hospitals, five are public hospitals while 10 are private. There are two psychiatric hospitals, one public, and one private.

The provincial government is constructing a hospital specializing in cardiology; construction began in 2019 and is expected to be completed in 2022. It is claimed to be the first cardiology hospital in Eastern Indonesia.

== Transportation ==
There are 614.35 kilometers (381.74 mi) of road within the city boundaries, of which 472.53 km (293.62 mi) have been paved and sealed with asphalt. Most of the roads are owned by the city government; the rest are state-owned national roads or provincial roads. As of 2021, both inner and outer ring roads are under construction. The Kendari Bay Bridge, with a length of 1.34 km (0.83 mi), opened in 2020 and shortened travel times crossing the bay between Kota Lama and Poasia from a half hour to 5 minutes.

The city is served by Haluoleo Airport, formerly Wolter Monginsidi Airport. It has regular flights to Jakarta and Makassar and smaller regions around it. Haluoleo is being developed into an international airport to relieve pressure on the already congested Sultan Hasanuddin International Airport. Kendari New Port, in the city, is an international seaport, managed by Pelindo IV, which is used for the export and import of goods from the region. It is one of two international container ports on Sulawesi island that are currently being developed along with Makassar New Port in the city of Makassar. There are smaller ports, such as Wawonii and Nusantara, used mostly for ferries to the smaller islands surrounding the city. Almost 4,800 ships visited the city in 2020.

Usage of ride-hailing services such as Gojek and Grab is widespread in the city. Like most other Indonesian cities, angkots run on routes regulated by city government within Kendari. For long-distance land travel, the city is served by Perum DAMRI with various routes to the city of Baubau, Kolaka Regency, and the towns of Raha, Ereke, and Tondasi inside the province as well as interprovince routes to Tana Toraja Regency and Makassar. The city also has an urban bus system run by the city government since 2015.

== Media ==
Many online and print media companies are based in the city, largely serving southeastern Sulawesi. One is the Fajar Group, a media conglomerate that owns several television channels, print media, and online news websites in the city and province. There are several private television channels in Kendari including Net.Kendari, GlobalTV Kendari, and local channels including Sigma TV. The Indonesian state-owned television channel TVRI and state-owned radio broadcaster Radio Republik Indonesia also have branches in the city.
