= Wangi Wangi =

Wangi wangi or Wangi-wangi may refer to:

== Places ==
- Wangi-wangi Island, the north-west cluster of the Tukangbesi Islands, and is the seat of the Wakatobi Regency, part of the province of Southeast Sulawesi, Indonesia
- Wangi Wangi, New South Wales, a suburb of the City of Lake Macquarie in New South Wales, Australia

== Animals ==
- Wangi Wangi white-eye (Zosterops paruhbesar), a species of songbird
