= Matahora Airport =

Airport in Indonesia

Matahora Airport Bandar Udara Matahora
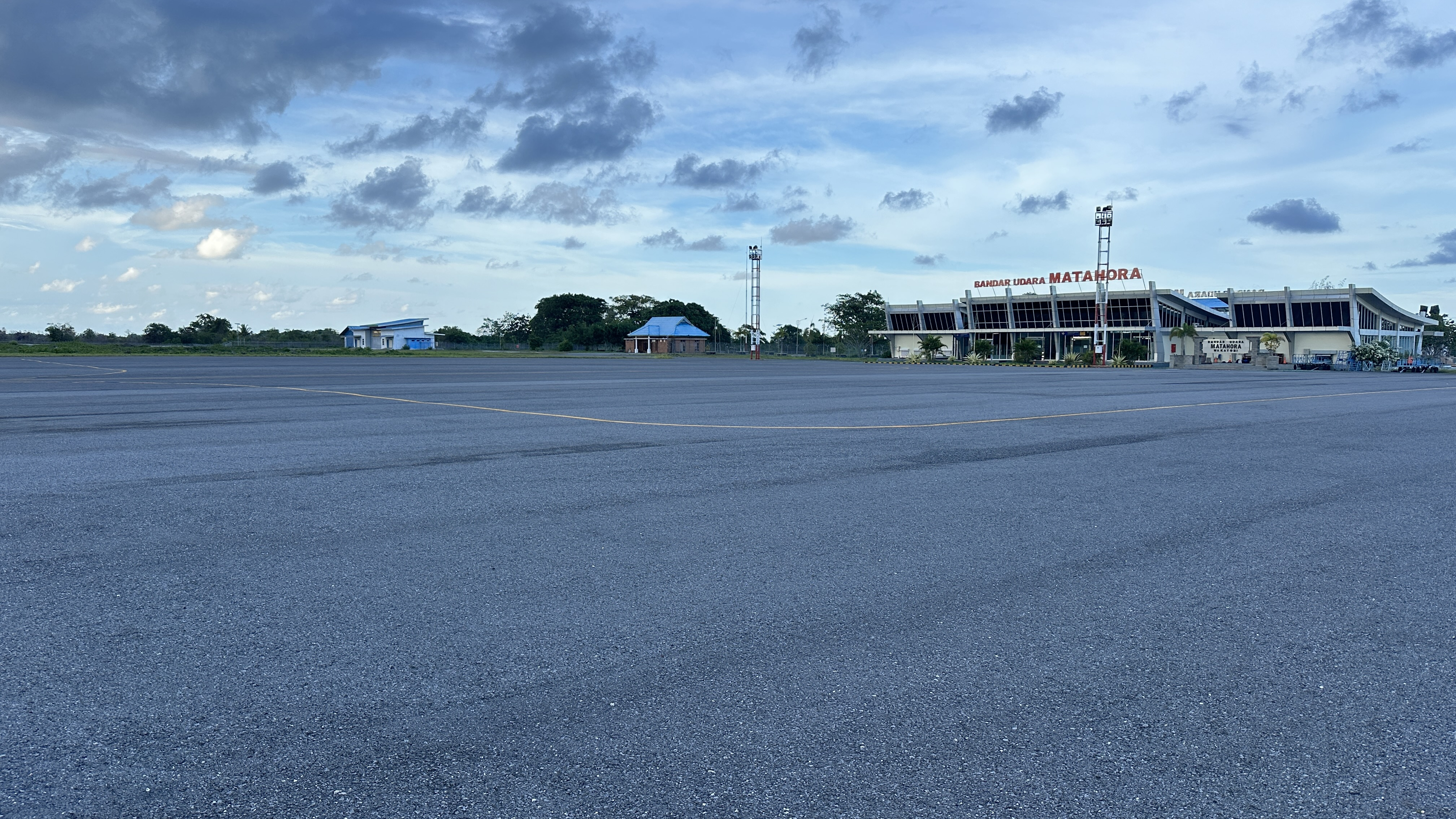
- IATA: WNI; ICAO: WAWD

Summary
- Airport type: Public
- Owner: Government of Indonesia
- Operator: Directorate General of Civil Aviation
- Serves: Wangi-Wangi
- Location: Wangi-Wangi, Wakatobi Regency, Southeast Sulawesi, Indonesia
- Time zone: WITA (UTC+08:00)
- Elevation AMSL: 0 m (0 ft)
- Coordinates: 05°19′00″S 123°35′00″E

Map
- Location in Sulawesi Location in Indonesia

Runways
Direction	Length		Surface
Direction	m	ft	Surface
04/22	2,000	6,562	Asphalt

Statistics (2024)
- Passengers: 5,420 (▼39.85%)
- Cargo (tonnes): N/A
- Aircraft movements: 192 (▲21.52%)
- Source: DGCA

Matahora Airport (IATA: WNI, ICAO: WAWD) is a domestic airport serving Wangi-Wangi, the largest town on Wangi-Wangi Island and the seat of Wakatobi Regency, Southeast Sulawesi, Indonesia. Named after the village in which the airport is located, it lies approximately 11 km (6.8 mi) from Wangi-Wangi town centre and serves as the main gateway to the town and island, as well as the nearby Wakatobi National Park, a major international tourist destination, and the surrounding area. The airport currently has limited scheduled services, with flights to Kendari, the provincial capital of Southeast Sulawesi, operated by FlyJaya, and to Denpasar in Bali, operated by TransNusa. Regular services to Makassar, previously operated by Super Air Jet and Wings Air, have since been discontinued.

== History ==
=== Construction and opening ===
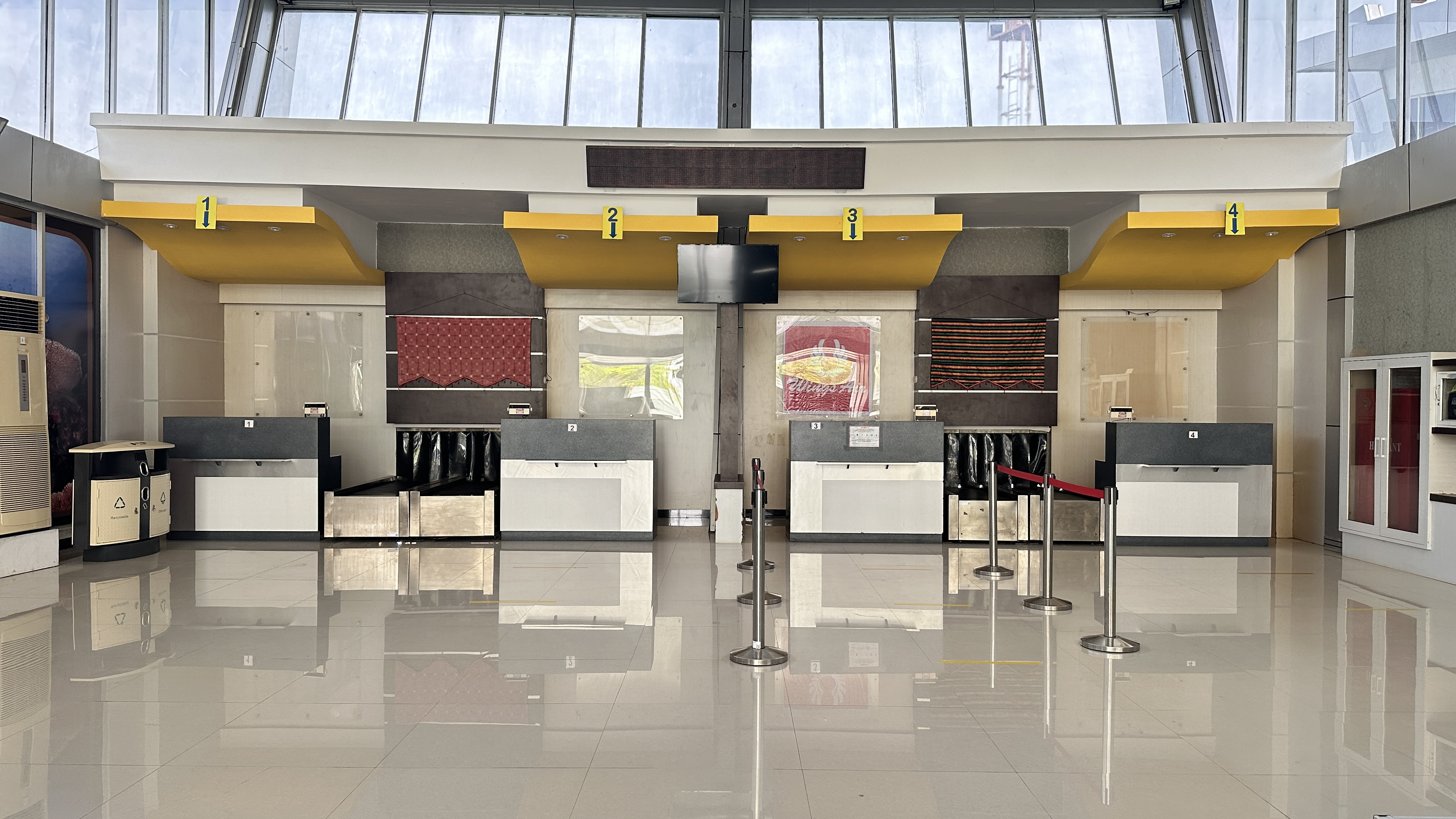
Check-in counters

Matahora Airport was constructed to provide Wakatobi Regency with safer and more reliable air transportation. Before the airport was built, Wakatobi could only be reached by sea, where waves reaching up to 7 metres frequently disrupted travel, limiting mobility and hindering the development of tourism. This led the then-Regent of Wakatobi, Hugua, to push for the construction of a new airport to serve Wakatobi.

The airport was also built so that it can serve as a potential major backup airport for Haluoleo Airport in Kendari and other airports in eastern Indonesia. Given its strategic location, Matahora Airport was considered to have the potential to serve as a transit and diversion airport for the region. In the event of adverse weather conditions preventing aircraft from landing at Haluoleo Airport or airports in Maluku, Matahora Airport could serve as an alternative diversion airport, alongside Sultan Hasanuddin International Airport in Makassar and I Gusti Ngurah Rai International Airport in Denpasar, Bali.

Construction began in 2007, with an initial 1,400-metre runway, with an investment of 100 billion Rupiah from the Southeast Sulawesi provincial government. The airport was inaugurated on 22 May 2009 by then-Minister of Transportation Jusman Syafii Djamal, coinciding with the inaugural Susi Air flight between Wakatobi and Kendari. In the same year, Express Air inaugurated the Jakarta–Makassar–Wakatobi–Baubau route, operating Boeing 737 Classic aircraft on the Jakarta–Makassar leg and Dornier 328 aircraft on the Makassar–Wakatobi–Baubau sector.

=== Contemporary history ===
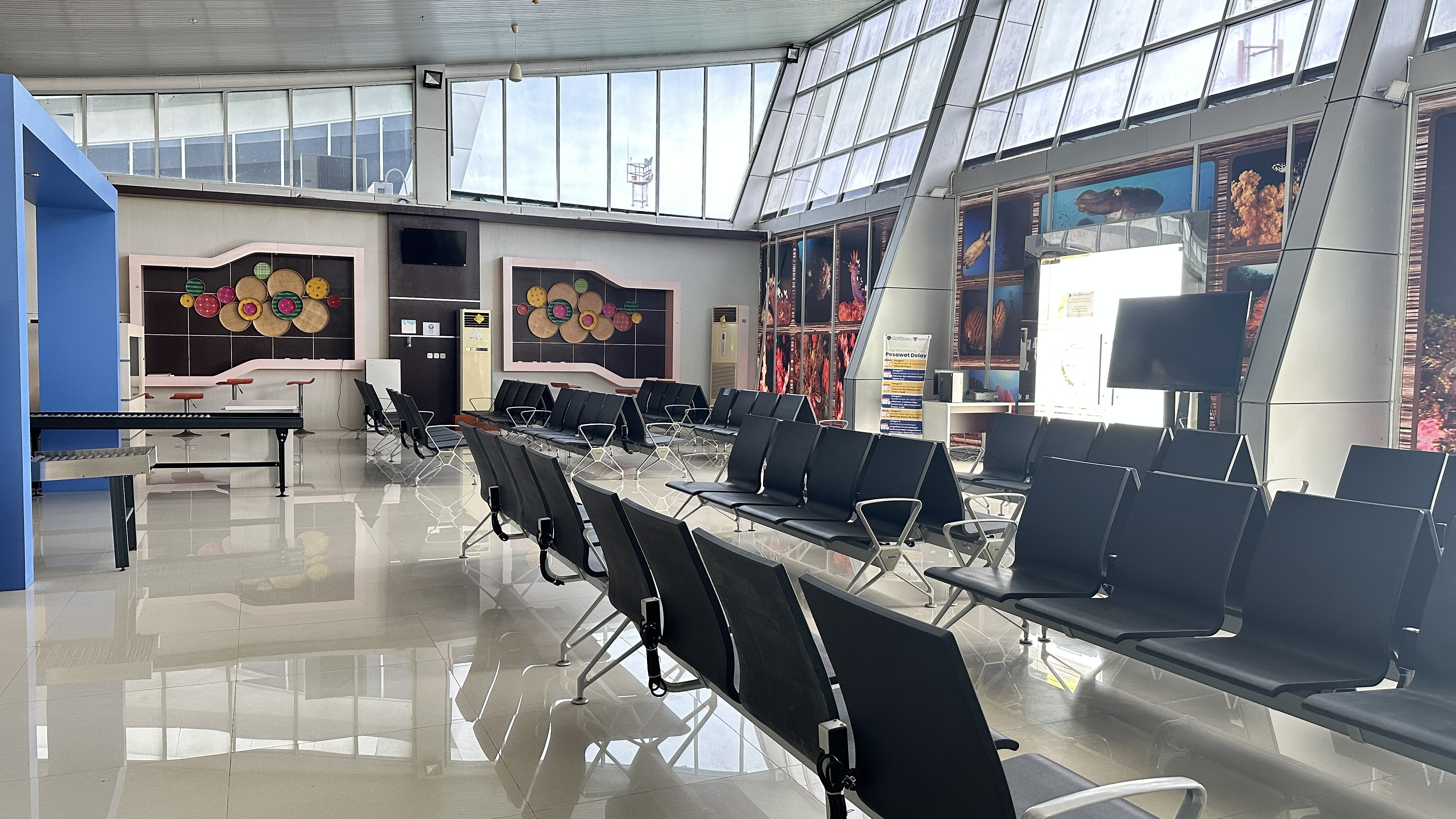
Boarding gate

Initially, the airport was managed by the Wakatobi Regency Government before being transferred to the Directorate General of Civil Aviation (DGCA) of the Ministry of Transportation in 2015. Matahora Airport is currently managed by the Matahora Airport Administration Unit (UPBU Matahora), which operates under the DGCA. The airport has played an important role in reducing Wakatobi's geographic isolation while supporting the growth of tourism and the local economy. The number of visitors increased from approximately 3,000 in 2009 to 17,000 in 2015, contributing to Wakatobi's designation as one of Indonesia's national priority tourism destinations and part of the government's "New Bali" initiative.

In November 2015, Matahora Airport received the "Best Airport Award 2015" from Majalah Bandara, an Indonesian aviation publication.

Between 2013 and 2015, the airport underwent major renovations and expansions, including the extension of the runway and apron to accommodate more and larger aircraft, the construction of a new terminal, and improvements to other airport facilities. The overall project cost approximately Rp80 billion.

Several airlines have operated at the airport over the years, including Susi Air, Express Air, Merpati Nusantara Airlines, Wings Air, and Garuda Indonesia. Following the temporary suspension of flights during the COVID-19 pandemic in 2020, government subsidies enabled Wings Air to resume services in 2022–2023. In October 2024, Super Air Jet became the first commercial narrow-body airline to serve the airport, operating Airbus A320 flights between Makassar and Wakatobi. However, the airline only operated for about one month, allegedly due to the lack of government subsidies to support the continuation of the route. Wings Air again suspended its Kendari–Wakatobi route in May 2025. Currently, FlyJaya is the sole airline operating the Kendari–Wakatobi route.

IIn July 2026, TransNusa inaugurated a new Wakatobi–Denpasar route, providing a direct air link between two of Indonesia's major tourist destinations.

== Facilities and development ==
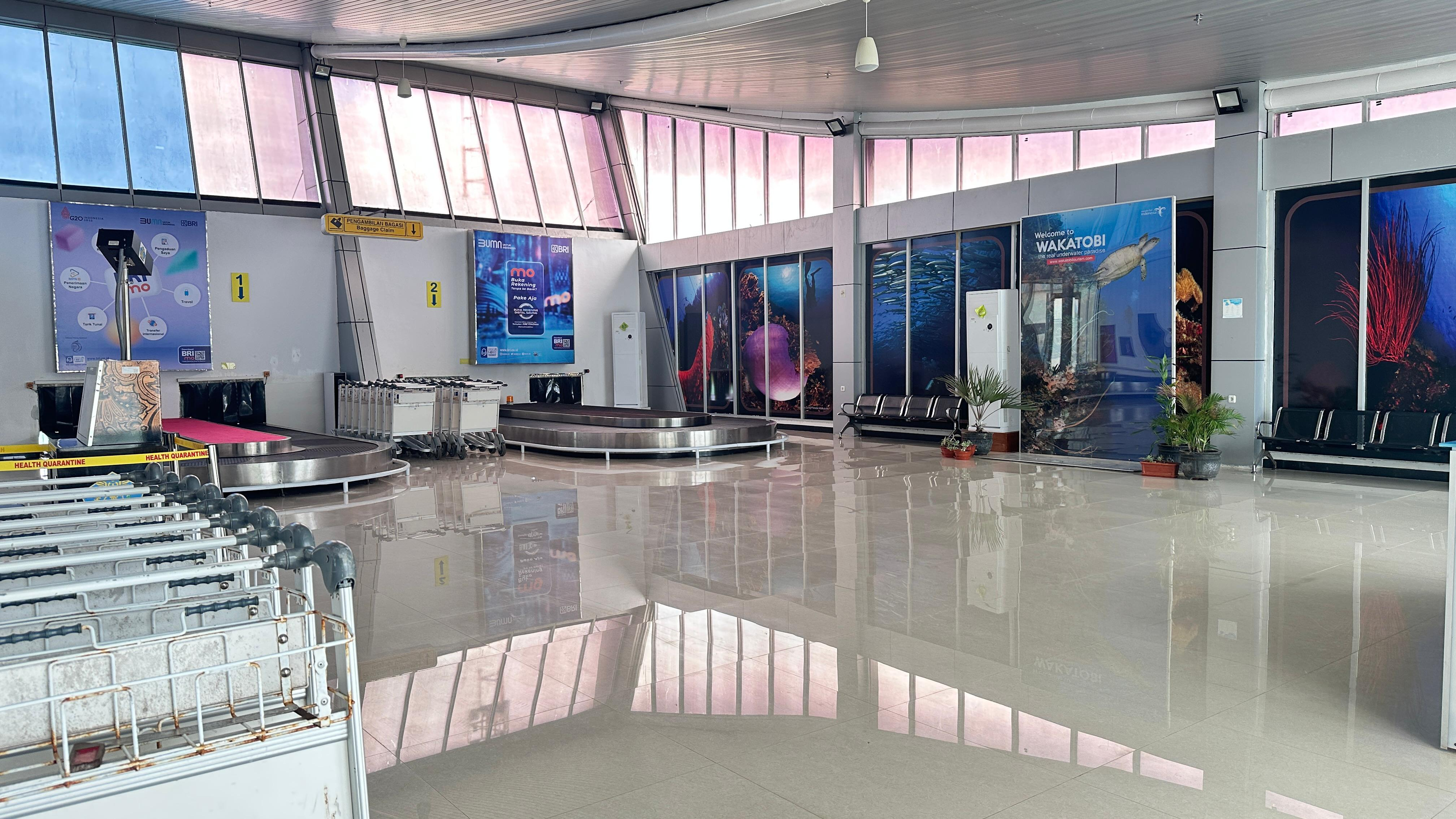
Baggage claim area

A new passenger terminal was inaugurated on 8 May 2016 by then-Minister of Transportation Ignasius Jonan. The terminal covers an area of 1,524 m² (16,400 sq ft) and can accommodate up to 150 passengers per day. Its facilities include a more spacious boarding lounge, modernised check-in counters, a reorganised concession area, and improved toilet facilities. Other landside facilities include a building for Rescue and Fire Fighting Services, a non-directional beacon, a quarantine building, and an expanded vehicle parking area. On the airside, the airport apron was expanded to 103 m × 73 m (338 ft × 240 ft) to accommodate larger aircraft. A 107 m × 18 m (351 ft × 59 ft) taxiway was also constructed. Security infrastructure was upgraded with additional passenger and baggage screening equipment, including X-ray scanners, as well as new security posts.

Matahora Airport is slated to be upgraded to international status to support the development of tourism in Wakatobi. The upgrade was initially targeted for completion in 2019, following the government's designation of Wakatobi as one of Indonesia's ten priority tourism destinations. To accommodate the anticipated increase in international traffic, the airport's runway and other supporting infrastructure would need to be upgraded.

In 2016, Matahora Airport's runway was extended to 2,000 m (6,600 ft) in length, enabling it to accommodate narrow-body aircraft such as the Boeing 737 and Airbus A320. Plans were made to extend the runway to 2,500 m (8,200 ft) while maintaining its width at 45 m (148 ft).

In 2020, planned development works included the construction of a Runway End Safety Area (RESA), installation of a perimeter fence around the airport grounds, widening and resurfacing of the access road to the Aircraft Rescue and Fire Fighting (ARFF) unit, and construction of a cargo terminal. Further development was planned for 2021, including a 250 m × 45 m runway extension, site preparation for the runway extension, expansion of the apron to 150 m × 85 m, including new markings, and construction of an access road to the cargo terminal.

== Airlines and destinations ==
Airlines	Destinations
FlyJaya	Kendari
TransNusa	Denpasar

== Statistics ==
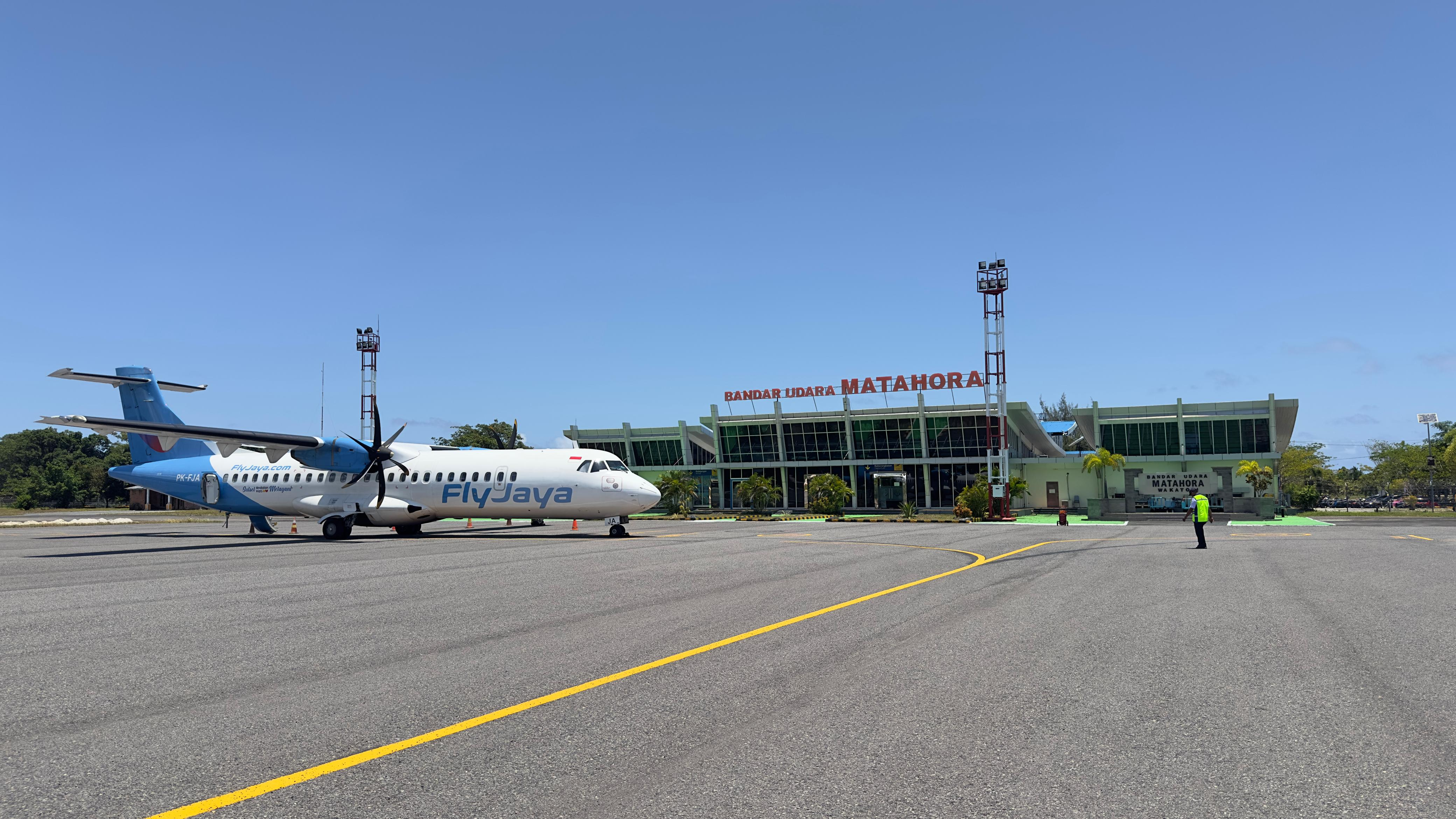
A FlyJaya ATR 72-500 at Matahora Airport

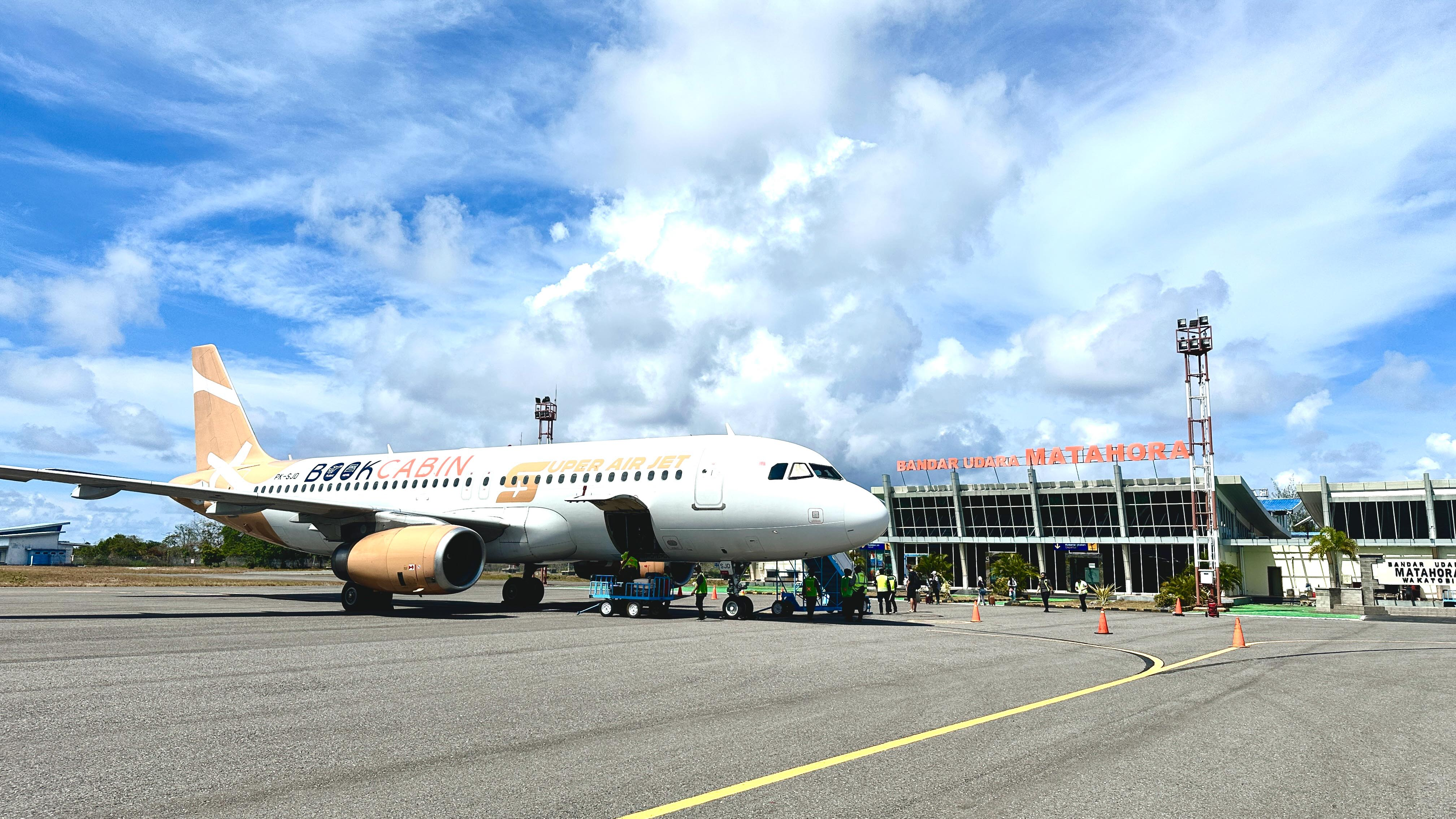
A Super Air Jet Airbus A320-200 at Matahora Airport

Annual passenger numbers and aircraft statistics
Year	Passengers handled	Passenger % change	Cargo (tonnes)	Cargo % change	Aircraft movements	Aircraft % change
2009	N/A	Steady	N/A	Steady	N/A	Steady
2010	19,267	Steady	N/A	Steady	654	Steady
2011	19,057	▼1.09	N/A	Steady	1,046	▲59.94
2012	26,520	▲39.16	N/A	Steady	1,098	▲4.97
2013	20,826	▼21.47	N/A	Steady	380	▼65.39
2014	35,532	▲70.61	39.90	Steady	688	▲81.05
2015	39,266	▲10.51	N/A	Steady	776	▲12.79
2016	44,000	▲12.06	28.10	Steady	849	▲9.41
2017	47,614	▲8.21	39.22	▲39.57	921	▲8.48
2018	60,585	▲27.24	28.27	▼27.92	1,132	▲22.91
2019	43,954	▼27.45	29.89	▲5.73	747	▼34.01
2020	24,932	▼43.28	32.18	▲7.66	497	▼33.47
2021	16,989	▼31.86	62.09	▲92.95	384	▼22.74
2022	14,410	▼15.18	37.61	▼39.43	424	▲10.42
2023	9,011	▼37.47	0.46	▼98.78	158	▼62.74
2024	5,420	▼39.85	N/A	Steady	192	▲21.52
Source: DGCA, BPS
