= Super Air Jet =

Ultra-low-cost airline of Indonesia

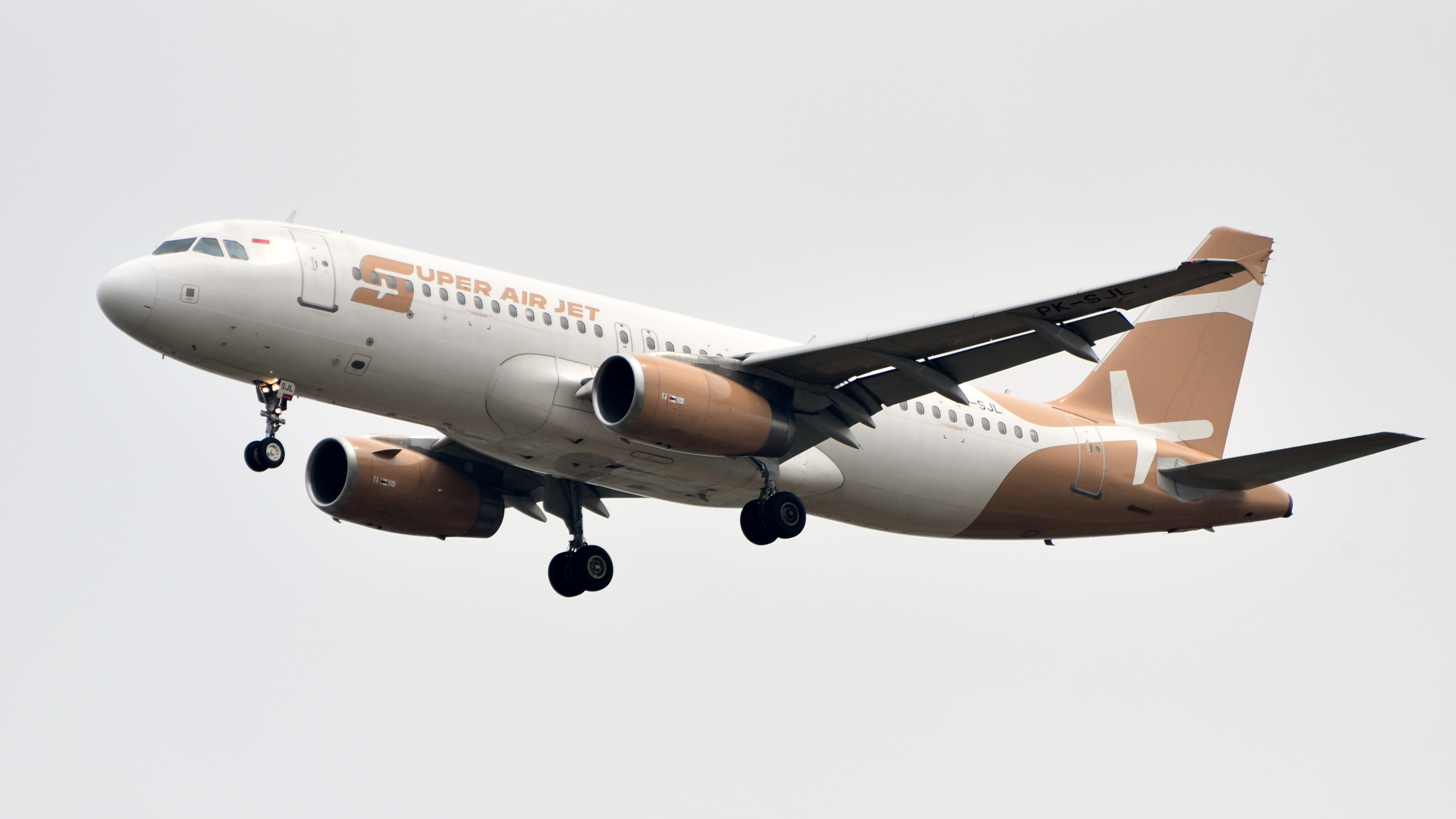
- Super Air Jet Airbus A320
IATA	ICAO	Call sign
IU	SJV	PROSPER
- Founded: 1 March 2021; 5 years ago
- Commenced operations: 6 August 2021; 5 years ago
- Operating bases: Balikpapan; Batam; Denpasar; Jakarta–Soekarno-Hatta; Makassar; Medan; Semarang; Surabaya; Yogyakarta–International
- Fleet size: 60
- Destinations: 40
- Headquarters: Jakarta, Indonesia
- Key people: Ari Azhari (CEO)
- Website: www.superairjet.com/en/

Super Air Jet is an Indonesian ultra low-cost airline based in Soekarno–Hatta International Airport. The airline was founded in March 2021 and commenced operations on 6 August 2021.

== History ==
Super Air Jet was formally launched in March 2021, and is financed by Lion Air Group founder, Rusdi Kirana. The airline obtained its Air Operator's Certificate from the Indonesian Ministry of Transportation on 30 June 2021 and will be launching the same year to 11 destinations in Indonesia. The airline is headed by Ari Azhari, who once served as the General Manager of Services for the Lion Air Group. Despite the airline's close connections to the Lion Air Group, its official channels has rejected claims of any formal ties to Lion Air and its subsidiaries.

The airline adopts an ultra low-cost model that focuses on point-to-point journeys to transport passengers between islands in Indonesia with extreme low fares. It focuses on millennials as a target market. The airline launched its services with six maiden routes from Jakarta to Batam, Medan, Padang, Palembang, Pekanbaru, and Pontianak.

Super Air Jet launched flights with three used Airbus A320-200s which formerly flew for India's IndiGo and Tigerair Australia. The airline officially commenced operations on 6 August 2021 with a flight from Jakarta to Medan and Batam, following a month long delay due to the Indonesian Community Activities Restrictions Enforcement following the COVID-19 pandemic in Indonesia.

== Destinations ==
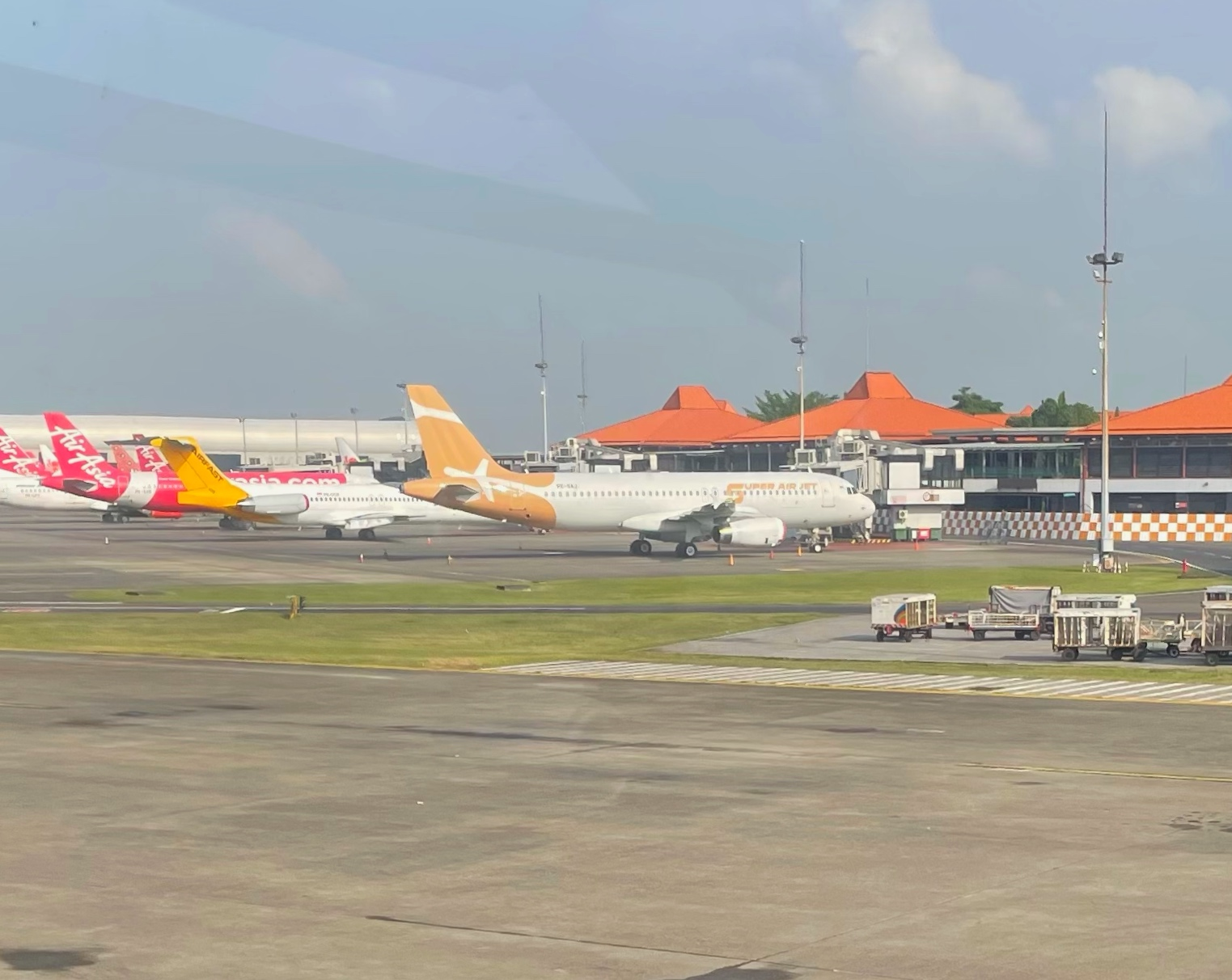
Super Air Jet Airbus A320-200 at Soekarno–Hatta International Airport

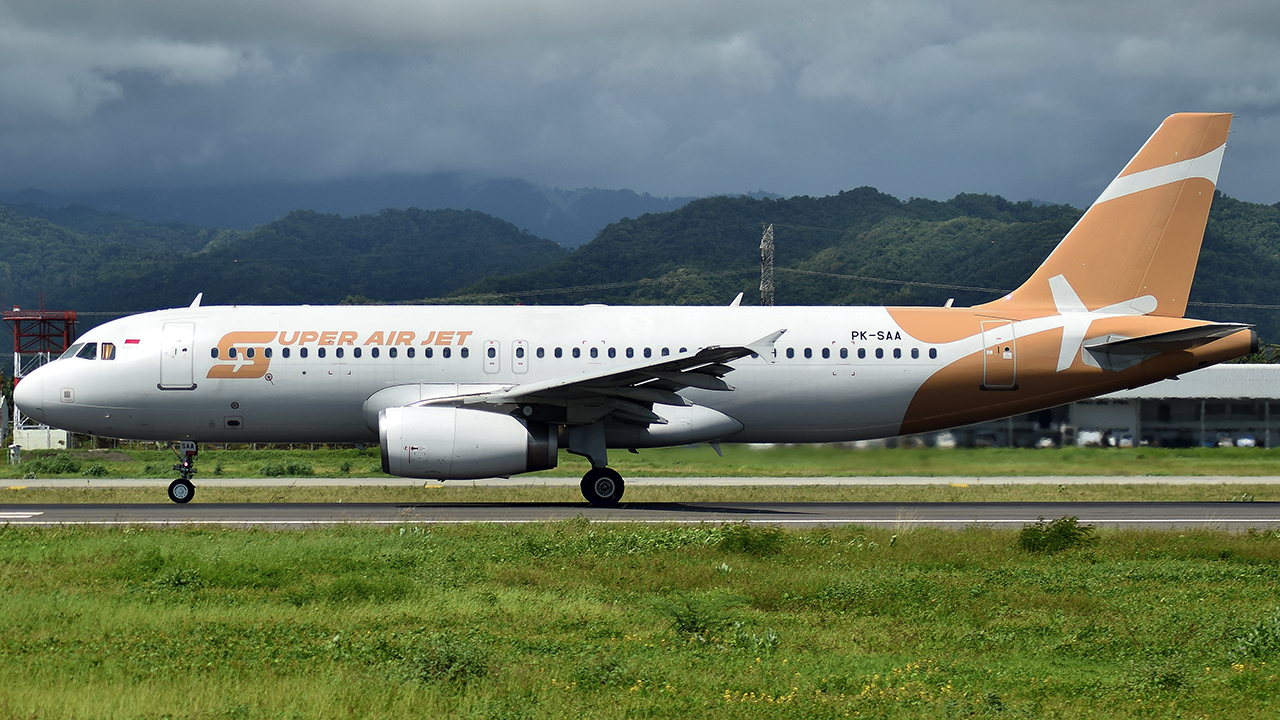
An Airbus A320 of Super Air Jet at Yogyakarta International Airport

Super Air Jet Interior.

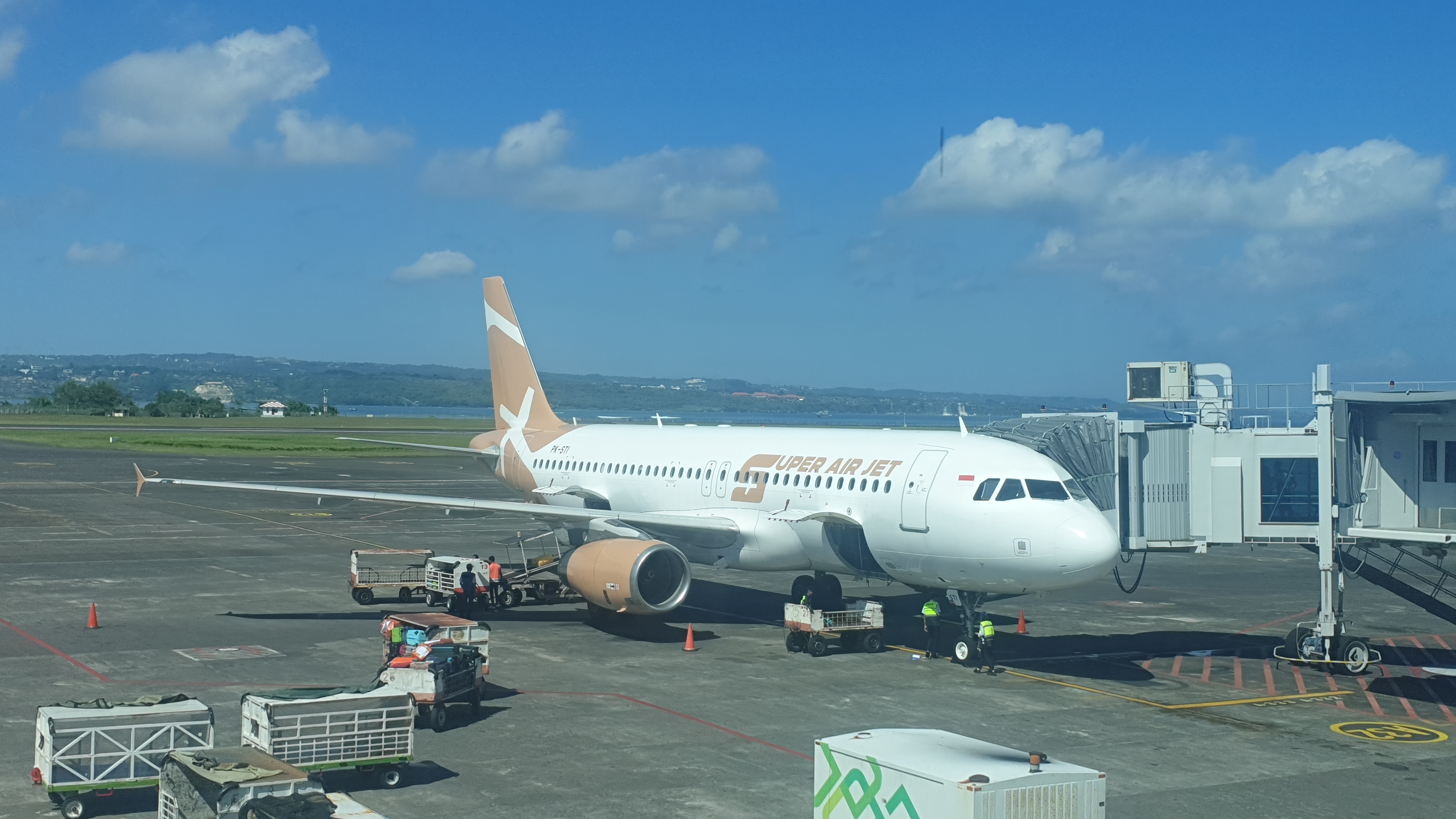
An Airbus A320 of Super Air Jet at Ngurah Rai International Airport

As of May 2025, Super Air Jet currently serves 40 destinations.

Country	City	Airport	Notes	Refs
Indonesia	Ambon	Pattimura Airport	Terminated	
Indonesia	Balikpapan	Sultan Aji Muhammad Sulaiman Sepinggan Airport	Base	
Indonesia	Banda Aceh	Sultan Iskandar Muda International Airport		
Indonesia	Bandar Lampung	Radin Inten II International Airport		
Indonesia	Bandung	Husein Sastranegara Airport		
Indonesia	Bandung	Kertajati International Airport	Terminated	
Indonesia	Banjarmasin	Syamsudin Noor International Airport		
Indonesia	Banyuwangi	Banyuwangi Airport		
Indonesia	Baubau	Betoambari Airport		
Indonesia	Batam	Hang Nadim International Airport	Base	
Indonesia	Bengkulu	Fatmawati Soekarno Airport		
Indonesia	Berau	Kalimarau Airport		
Indonesia	Denpasar	Ngurah Rai International Airport	Base	
Indonesia	Jakarta	Soekarno–Hatta International Airport	Base	
Indonesia	Jambi	Sultan Thaha Airport		
Indonesia	Jayapura	Sentani International Airport	Terminated	
Indonesia	Kediri	Dhoho Airport		
Indonesia	Kendari	Haluoleo Airport		
Indonesia	Kupang	El Tari Airport		
Indonesia	Labuan Bajo	Komodo International Airport		
Indonesia	Lubuk Linggau	Silampari Airport	Terminated	
Indonesia	Makassar	Sultan Hasanuddin International Airport	Base	
Indonesia	Manado	Sam Ratulangi International Airport		
Indonesia	Manokwari	Rendani Airport		
Indonesia	Mataram	Lombok International Airport		
Indonesia	Medan	Kualanamu International Airport	Base	
Indonesia	Padang	Minangkabau International Airport		
Indonesia	Palangkaraya	Tjilik Riwut Airport		
Indonesia	Palembang	Sultan Mahmud Badaruddin II International Airport		
Indonesia	Palu	Mutiara SIS Al-Jufrie Airport		
Indonesia	Pangkal Pinang	Depati Amir Airport		
Indonesia	Pekanbaru	Sultan Syarif Kasim II International Airport		
Indonesia	Pontianak	Supadio International Airport		
Indonesia	Samarinda	Aji Pangeran Tumenggung Pranoto International Airport		
Indonesia	Sampit	H. Asan Airport		
Indonesia	Semarang	Jenderal Ahmad Yani International Airport	Base	
Indonesia	Siborong-Borong	Raja Sisingamangaraja XII Airport		
Indonesia	Sorong	Domine Eduard Osok Airport	Terminated	
Indonesia	Surabaya	Juanda International Airport	Base	
Indonesia	Surakarta	Adisoemarmo International Airport		
Indonesia	Tanjung Pandan	H.A.S. Hanandjoeddin International Airport		
Indonesia	Tarakan	Juwata Airport		
Indonesia	Ternate	Sultan Babullah Airport	Terminated	
Indonesia	Wakatobi	Matahora Airport	Terminated	
Indonesia	Yogyakarta	Yogyakarta International Airport	Base	
Malaysia	Kuala Lumpur	Kuala Lumpur International Airport		

== Fleet ==
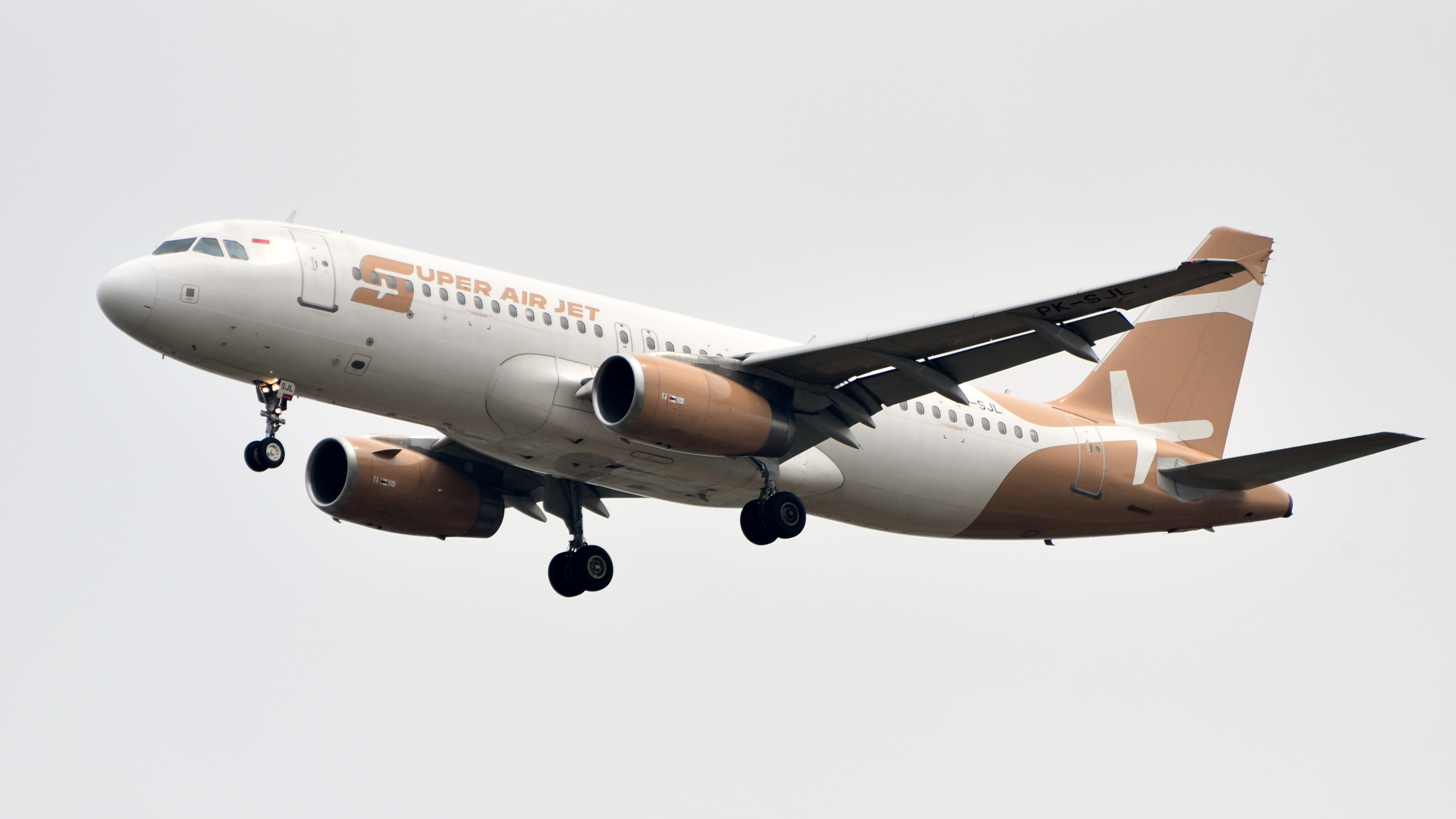
Super Air Jet Airbus A320, 2023

As of July 2026, Super Air Jet operates the following aircraft:

Super Air Jet fleet
Aircraft	In service	Orders	Passengers	Notes
Airbus A320-200	60		180	
Total	60		–	

=== Former fleet ===
As of August 2025, Super Air Jet operated 61 Airbus A320.

== See also ==
- Airlines of Indonesia
- Batik Air
- Lion Air Group
- Lion Air
- Wings Air
