= Tukangbesi Islands =

Island group in Indonesia

Coordinates: 5°19′35″S 123°35′43″E

Tukangbesi Islands, is a group of islands off the coast of Sulawesi immediately east of Buton island in the Banda Sea region, and part of Sulawesi Tenggara. The main islands are Wangiwangi Island, Kaledupa Island, Tomia Island, and Binongko Island, commonly abbreviated as Wakatobi and now under one administration, Wakatobi Regency. "Tukang Besi" literally means "iron worker" or "blacksmith" in Indonesian. This archipelago is called "tukangbesi" (blacksmith) because this archipelago is famous for making the best traditional keris which are still produced today. There is a Tukang Besi language. Separating Buton and the group is the Gulf of Kolowana Watabo.

Islands in the group:

- Wakatobi Islands
  - Northwest: Wangiwangi Island, Kambode, Kampenane, Timor
  - North Central: Kaledupa, Hoga, Linea Island,
  - South Central: Tomea Island|Tomea, Talondano, Lineta, Binongko
- Eastern outliers: Moromaho, Cowocowo, Kentiole, Runduma, Anano
- Western atolls. Karang Kapota, Karang Kaledupa
- Eastern atolls: Karang Koromaha, Karang Kadupa
- Langkesi islands (Kepulauan Langkesi) so the northeast.

The town of Papalia, Indonesia, is on Binongko.

== See also ==
- Wakatobi National Park
