= Wakatobi National Park =

Marine park in Southeast Sulawesi, Indonesia

- Taman Nasional Wakatobi
- IUCN category II (national park)
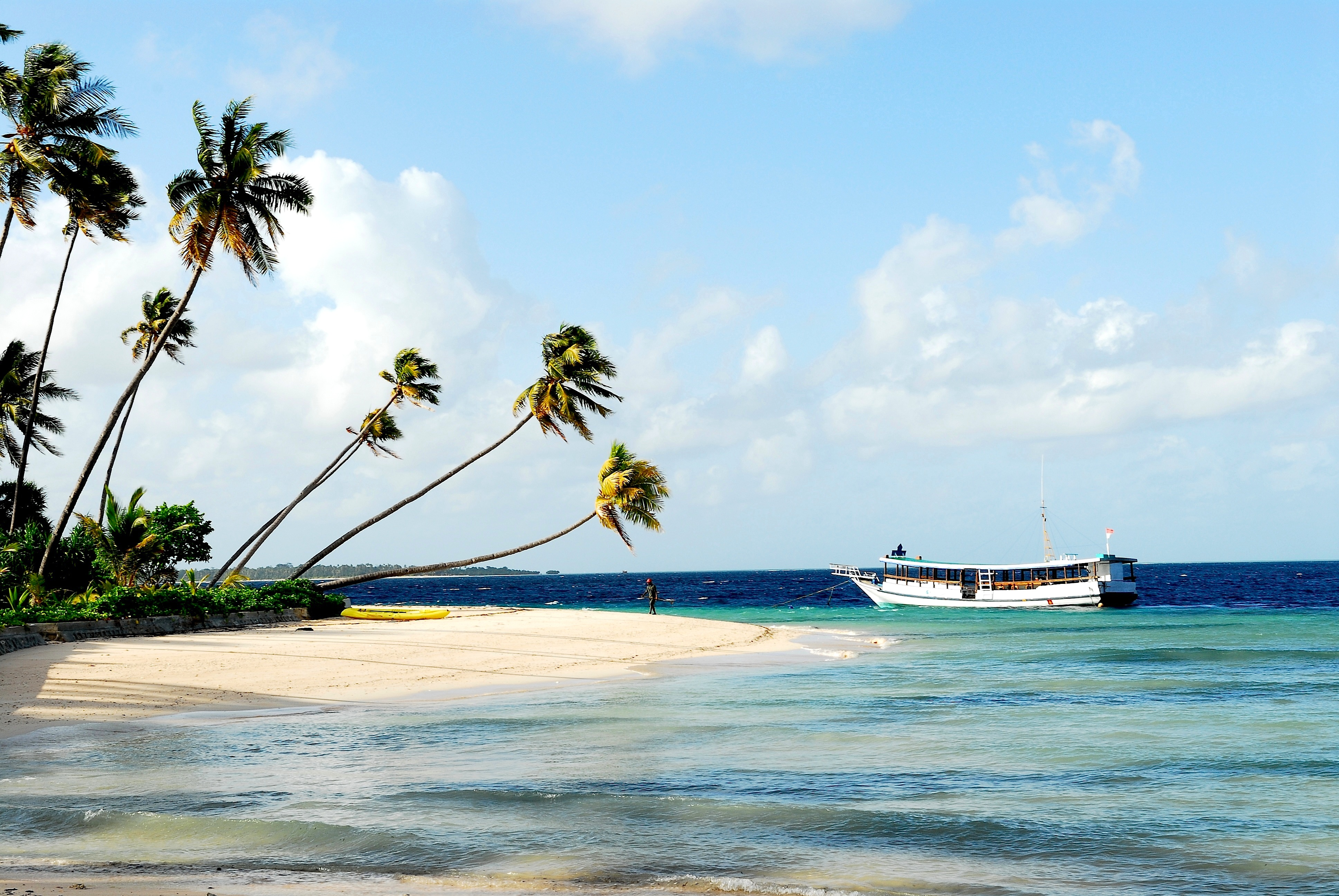

- Location within Sulawesi
- Location: Wakatobi Regency, Southeast Sulawesi, Indonesia
- Nearest city: Baubau
- Coordinates: 5°42′S 124°00′E
- Area: 13,900 km^{2} (5,400 sq mi)
- Established: 2002
- Governing body: Ministry of Forestry

Wakatobi National Park is a marine national park in Southeast Sulawesi, Indonesia. It was established in 2002. The name of Wakatobi is a portmanteau of the four main Tukangbesi Islands: Wangi-wangi, Kaledupa, Tomia, and Binongko. Since 2005 the park is listed as a tentative World Heritage Site.

== Location and topography ==
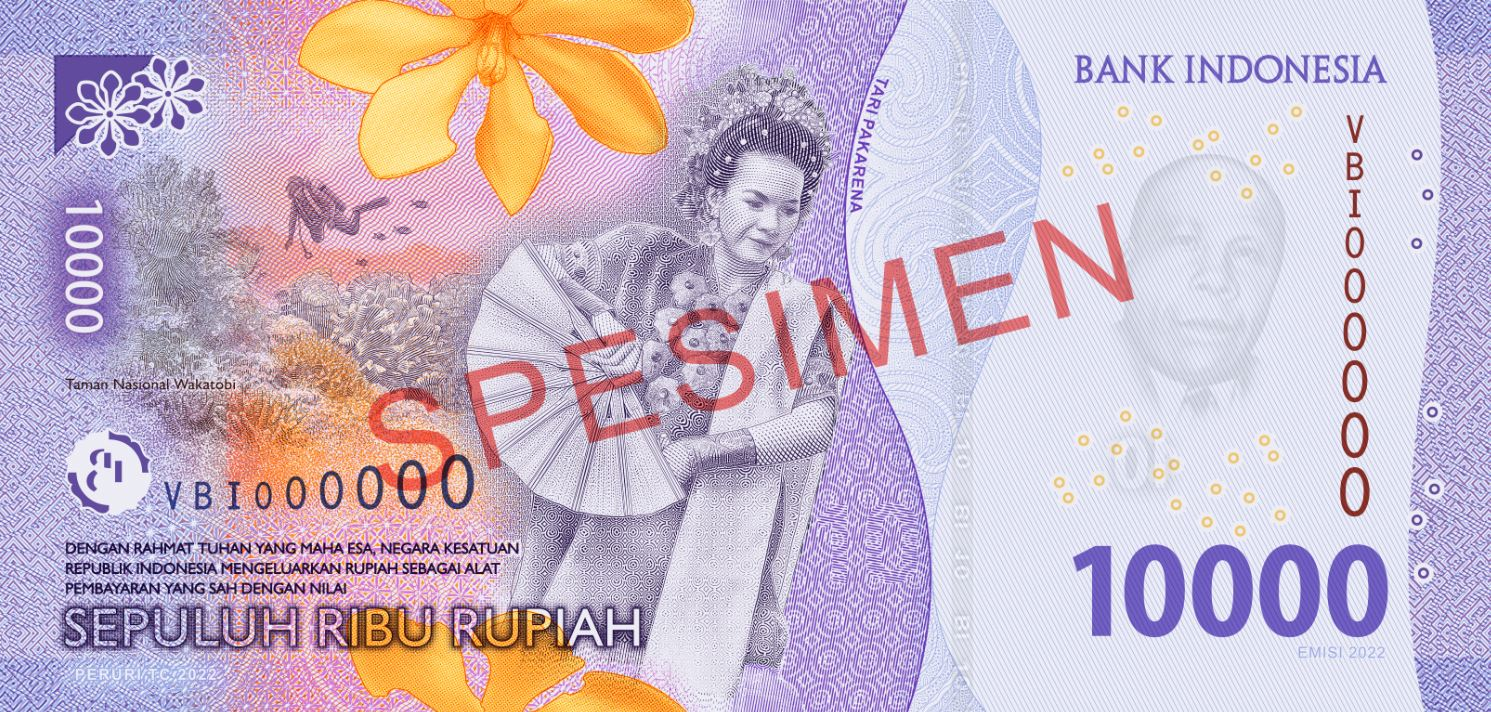
Wakatobi National Park featured on the reverse of the 10,000 rupiah banknote

Wakatobi National Park is located south-east of Sulawesi, between 05°12’-06°10’S and 123°20’-124°39’E, between the Banda Sea to the north-east and the Flores Sea to the south-west.

It consists of four larger islands: Wangi-Wangi, Kaledupa, Tomia and Binongko, as well as many small islands such as Tokobao, North Lintea, South Lintea, Kampenaune, Hoga and Tolandono. The highest elevation is 274 metres (899 ft) on Wangi-Wangi, followed by Lagole Hill (271m) on Tomia, Terpadu Hill (222 m) on Binongko and Mount Sampuagiwolo (203 m) on Kadelupa. The water depth varies, with the deepest parts reaching 1,044 metres (3,425 ft).

It is the third largest marine park in Indonesia. Jacques Cousteau is said to have called the Wakatobi islands – then known as the Tukangbesi islands: an "Underwater Nirvana". Now a national marine park covering the entire Waktobi District, it comprises 1.4 million hectares, of which 900,000 host tropical coral reefs. The islands form the largest barrier reef in Indonesia. It is the habitat of large and small fish species, dolphins, turtles and whales. The island group comprises 143 islands of which 7 are inhabited, counting a total population of around 100,000. Most notable are the Bajo communities, seafaring nomads who inhabit many of Indonesia’s remote islands.

== Flora and fauna ==
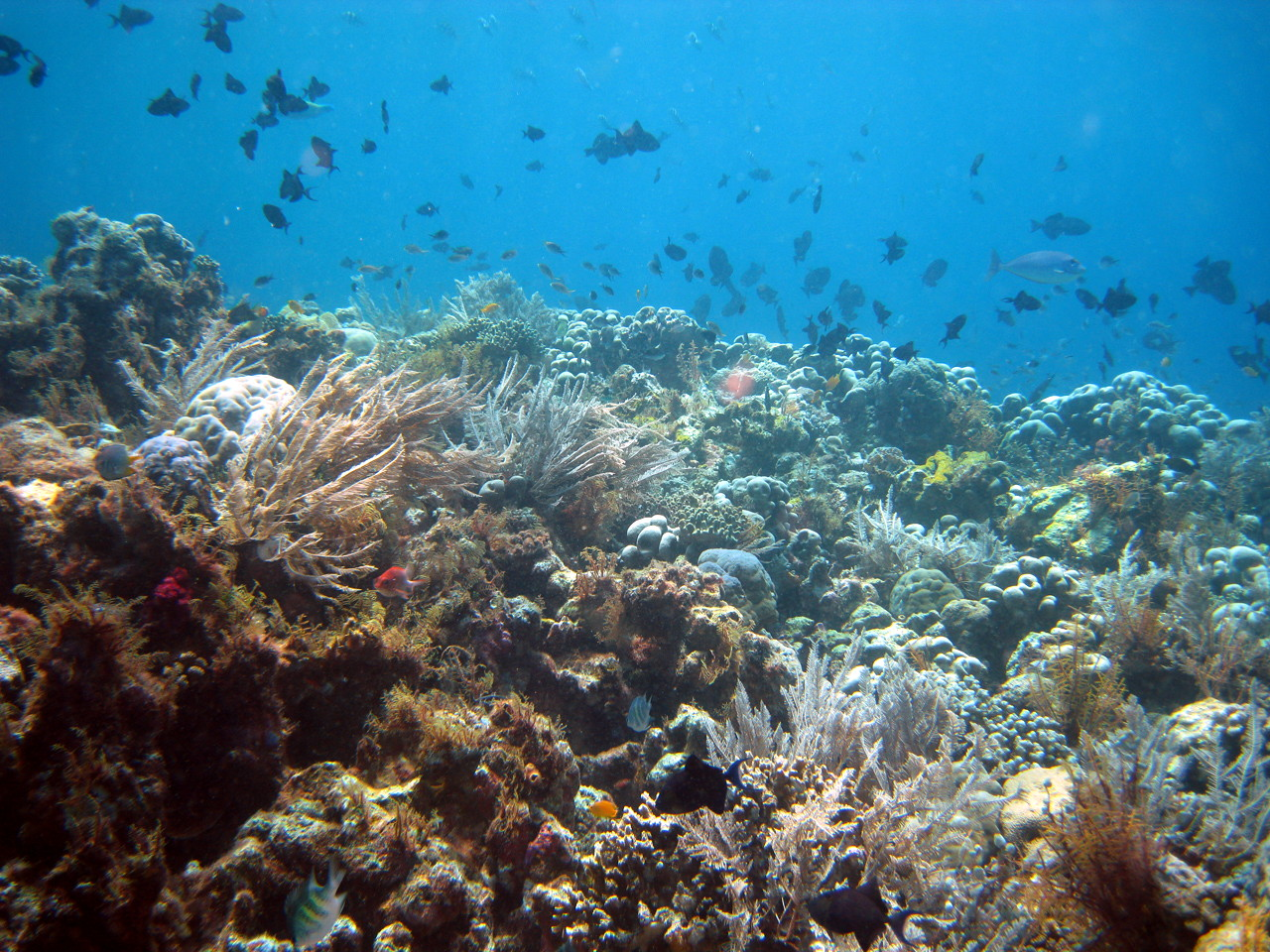
Coral reef in the national park

Located in the Asia-Pacific World Coral Triangle, in the province of Southeast Sulawesi, the Wakatobi Islands offer clear waters and a rich bio-diverse underwater life. Wakatobi hosts 942 fish species and 750 coral reef species (of 850 globally), versus 50 in the Caribbean and 300 in the Red Sea.

Habitats found in the national park are mangrove forest, coastal forest, lowland swamp forest, riverbank vegetation, lowland rainforest, mountain rainforest and coral reefs. The Wakatobi Archipelago has 25 groups of coral reefs including fringing reefs, barrier reefs and atolls. A survey conducted in 2003 identified 396 species of coral belonging to 68 genera and 15 families. These include Acropora formosa, Acropora hyacinthus, Psammocora profundasafla, Pavona cactus, Leptoseris yabei, Fungia molucensis, Lobophyllia robusta, Merulina ampliata, Platygyra versifora, Euphyllia glabrescens, Tubastraea frondes, Stylophora pistillata, Sarcophyton throchelliophorum, and Sinularia species.

Among the recorded species of seabirds are the brown booby, common kingfisher and Malaysian plover.

Turtles in the park include the hawksbill, loggerhead and olive ridley.

== Human habitation ==
The main settlement on the islands is the administrative centre for the Regency Baubau. In 2001, nearly 90,000 people lived on the islands. The demographics of the region are 91.33 percent Wakatobi, 7.92 percent Bajau, and less than one percent other ethnicities.

The Bajau people, in particular, rely heavily upon marine resources within the park for survival as a majority of the population are nomadic, subsistence-oriented fishers. Some Bajau fishers utilize techniques such as fish bombing and coral mining; these methods detrimentally impact the reef.

== Conservation and threats ==
After the designation of the Wakatobi Marine Conservation Area in 1996, the Wakatobi National Park was established in 2002. It is managed by the Wakatobi National Park Authority (Balai Taman Nasional). In 2005 the park was listed as a tentative World Heritage Site. In 2012 it was included in the World Network of Biosphere Reserves.

Wakatobi is a complex marine protected area that contains many zones which allow different levels of fishing and tourism. Areas of coral reefs are usually no-take zones, while open waters are often designated as traditional use zones, where local fishers are allowed to fish and make a living. The no-takes zones make up only 3.2% of the total MPA.

Historically, Wakatobi has had issues with management and economic stability for local communities. This can be seen when foreigners arrive and exploit the local communities. In the areas near the no-take zones, tour operators have enacted reef-leasing schemes. Foreign tour operators directly pay local villages for exclusive access to no-take zones for tourism. Villages that sign the reef-leasing contract essentially lose all rights to the area. The money is then used to repair public buildings and provide electricity in the villages.

The boundaries for the leased areas are discussed between village councils and operators in the absence of Park officials and fishermen. Therefore, while the tour operators and village government mutually benefited from such negotiation. The financial wellbeing of individual fishermen is often ignored.

Wakatobi has achieved some success in protecting coral reefs and increasing fish abundance compared to unprotected areas. However, there is a lack of protection for other key habitats such as seagrass beds and mangroves. The insufficient zoning of the park also results in less protection for migratory species, such as the green turtle.

While higher fish abundance is reported in some areas, most fisheries within Wakatobi are still overexploited. Subsistence fishing provides 70% of the protein requirement for the region. This dependence on marine resources coupled with a rapidly growing population has resulted in high pressure on many fisheries.

The reliance on marine resources has also created a split between locals and conservationists. The park and most conservation efforts are overseen by divisions of the Indonesian government, along with the WWF and the TNC. There is little participation and support from the local communities, resulting in many fishers ignoring the boundaries of the no-take zones. Lack of funding for enforcement allows this problem to perpetuate.

Indigenous communities, particularly the Bajau, are perceived by park officials as major contributors to marine resource conservation problems due to their history of overfishing and destructive fishing practices, including fish bombing and poison fishing. High noncompliance to park regulations and rules by the Bajau is often attributed to their exclusion from the creation and management of the park, distrust of government officials, confusion over the park’s purpose, and cultural values that do not align with conservation goals.

== Results of Established Protected Areas ==
In 2001 a small NTA (no-take-area) was established off the Island of Hoga. This establishment was in partnership between Operation Wallacea and local Bajau communities. It covers a 500m long section of fringing walled reef and reef flat. Observations suggest that the area is 80–90% successful in preventing fishing activities.

After the establishment of MPAs and NTA in Wakatobi, researchers have been recording the population status of fish and coral reef in the area. During July and August in 2001 through 2005 the population of the grouper, and of local coral reefs were recorded at four sites within the Kaledupa region of Wakatobi, these locations include:

1. Hoga NTA
2. Hoga lightly fished site (opposite Pak Kasim's resort)
3. Kaledupa lightly fished site (opposite Langira)
4. Sampela heavily fished site (opposite Sampela village)

The slightly fished sites are approximately 2 km (~4 miles) from a village and the heavily fished site is immediately adjacent to a Bajau village, in which marine resource dependency is very high.

Results: Coral Reef

The study was conducted in between July and August of years 2001–2005. In between these years, the observed total coral coverage differed significantly between the sites. The coral's vitality in the regions also differed. Hoga NTA had the highest ratio of living corals, whereas Sampela was dominated by dead corals and sand.

Results: Grouper

Prior to the NTA establishment in 2001, grouper population was similar between the NTA and both of the slightly fished sites. The heavily fished site contained 50% less grouper population than its counterparts.

Since 2001, grouper population in Hoga NTA has been increasing by 31±10% per year over the duration of the study.

As for the lightly fished site at Hoga, grouper population continued to fall for the first three years between 2001–2004. In 2005 the population of groupers at the site experienced its first increase.

The Kaledupa lightly fished site had an annual decline of 50 ± 10.5% per year, this caused the population of grouper at Kaledupa to be even lower than the heavily fished Sampela site. At the Sampela site, the population of groupers increased, however, overall population at the four sites yielded a negative increase of 14 ±13% per year in all four sites.
