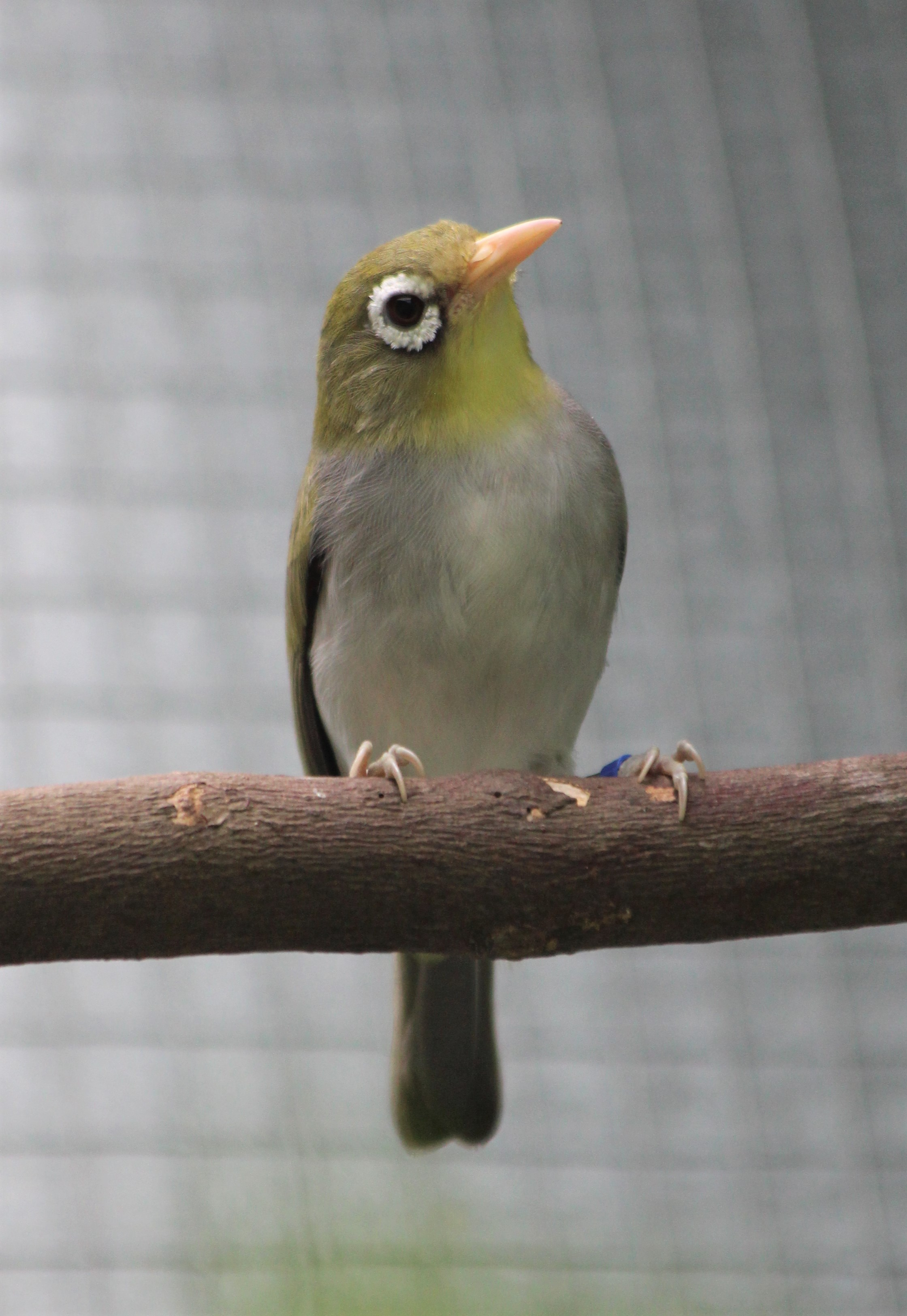

Conservation status
- Endangered (IUCN 3.1)

Scientific classification
- Kingdom: Animalia
- Phylum: Chordata
- Class: Aves
- Order: Passeriformes
- Family: Zosteropidae
- Genus: Zosterops
- Species: Z. paruhbesar

Binomial name
- Zosterops paruhbesar Irham et al., 2022

= Wangi-wangi white-eye =

Species of songbird

The Wangi-wangi white-eye (Zosterops paruhbesar), locally known as sui, is a species of songbird in the white-eye family. It is endemic to a single island, Wangi-wangi Island, in the Wakatobi Islands, Indonesia.

Zosterops paruhbesar has a yellowish head, throat, vent and mid ventral stripe. The flanks are greyish and the flight feathers and tail feathers are brown. Like many other white-eyes, it has a ring of white feathers around the eye. The Wangi-wangi white-eye's bright yellow bill sets it apart from the Wakatobi white-eye, the only other white-eye on Wangi-wangi, as well as other white-eye species in the broader region.

== See also ==
- List of bird species described in the 2020s
