= Wangi-wangi Island =

Island in Indonesia

Coordinates: 5.3164°S 123.5817°E

Wangi-wangi Island is in the north-west cluster of the Tukangbesi Islands and is the seat of the Wakatobi Regency, part of the province of Southeast Sulawesi. It covers an area of 191 km^{2} and had an estimated 61,283 inhabitants in mid 2022. To the west is the Gulf of Kolowana Watabo (Teluk Kolowana Watabo). The Wangi-wangi white-eye (Zosterops paruhbesar) is a recently discovered endangered bird on the island.

== Climate ==
Wangi-wangi or Wanci has a tropical climate (Am). In most months of the year, there is significant rainfall in Wanci. There is only a short dry season.

Climate data for Wanci
Month	Jan	Feb	Mar	Apr	May	Jun	Jul	Aug	Sep	Oct	Nov	Dec	Year
Mean daily maximum °C (°F)	28.3 (82.9)	28.2 (82.8)	28.3 (82.9)	28.3 (82.9)	28.1 (82.6)	27.5 (81.5)	26.9 (80.4)	26.7 (80.1)	27.1 (80.8)	27.9 (82.2)	28.5 (83.3)	28.5 (83.3)	27.9 (82.1)
Daily mean °C (°F)	27.6 (81.7)	27.5 (81.5)	27.5 (81.5)	27.5 (81.5)	27.4 (81.3)	26.8 (80.2)	26.4 (79.5)	26.3 (79.3)	26.7 (80.1)	27.3 (81.1)	27.8 (82.0)	27.8 (82.0)	27.2 (81.0)
Mean daily minimum °C (°F)	26.7 (80.1)	26.5 (79.7)	26.6 (79.9)	26.5 (79.7)	26.6 (79.9)	26.1 (79.0)	25.8 (78.4)	25.8 (78.4)	26.1 (79.0)	26.6 (79.9)	26.9 (80.4)	26.8 (80.2)	26.4 (79.6)
Average precipitation mm (inches)	154 (6.1)	154 (6.1)	153 (6.0)	216 (8.5)	265 (10.4)	227 (8.9)	124 (4.9)	43 (1.7)	36 (1.4)	69 (2.7)	102 (4.0)	159 (6.3)	1,702 (67)
Source: Climate-Data.org
