= Wakatobi Regency =

Regency in Southeast Sulawesi, Indonesia

Wakatobi Regency Kabupaten Wakatobi
- Regency
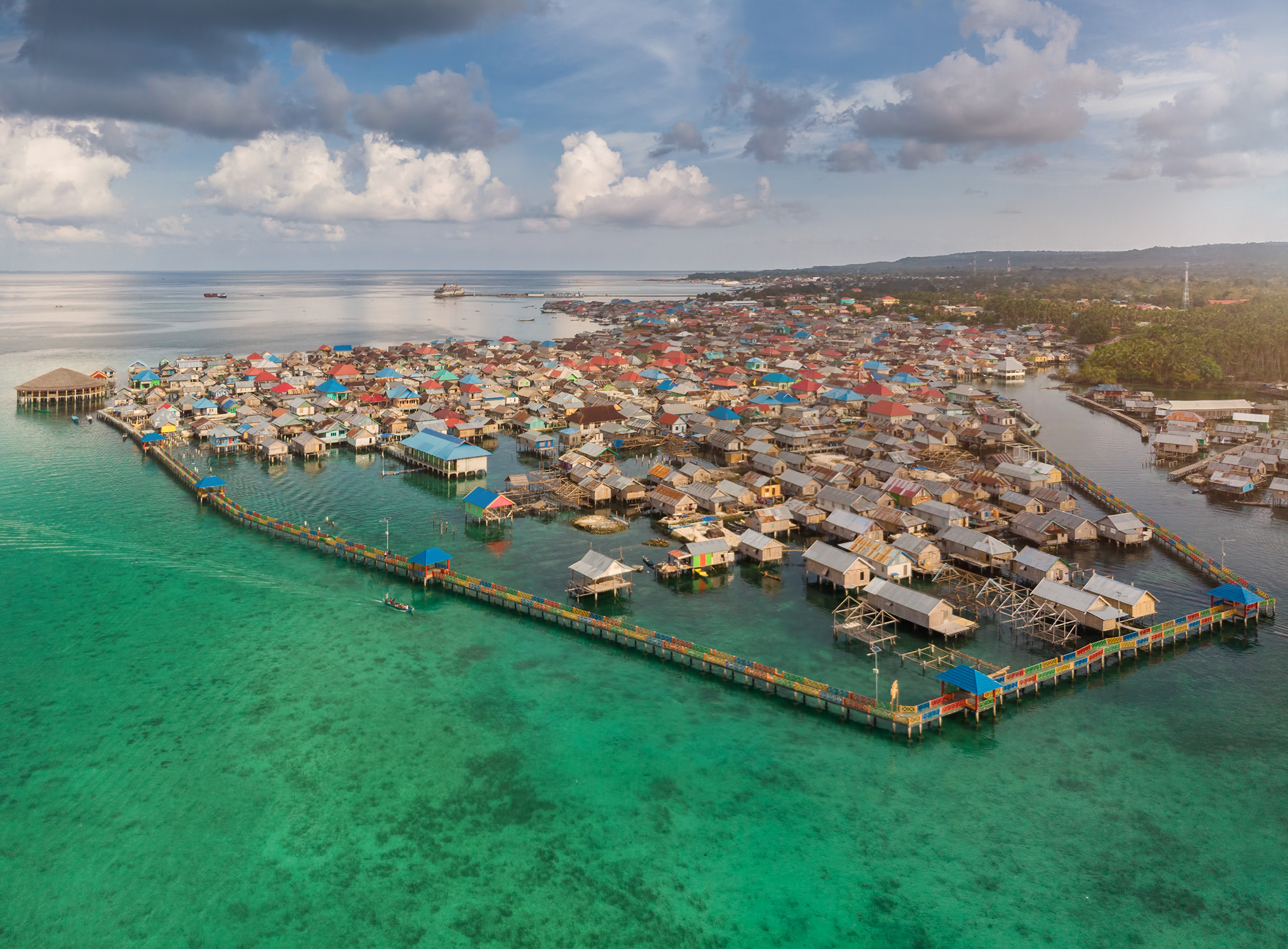
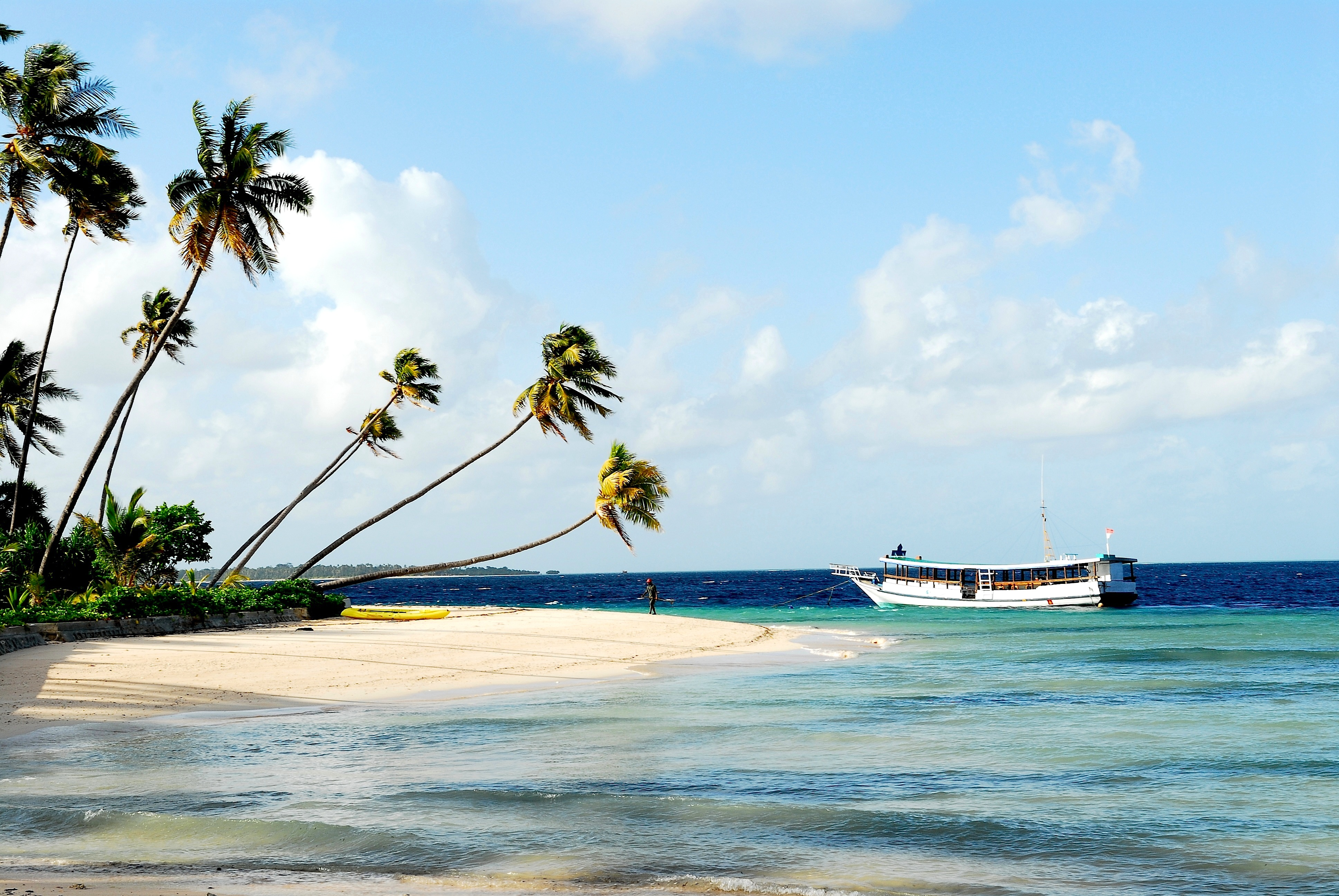
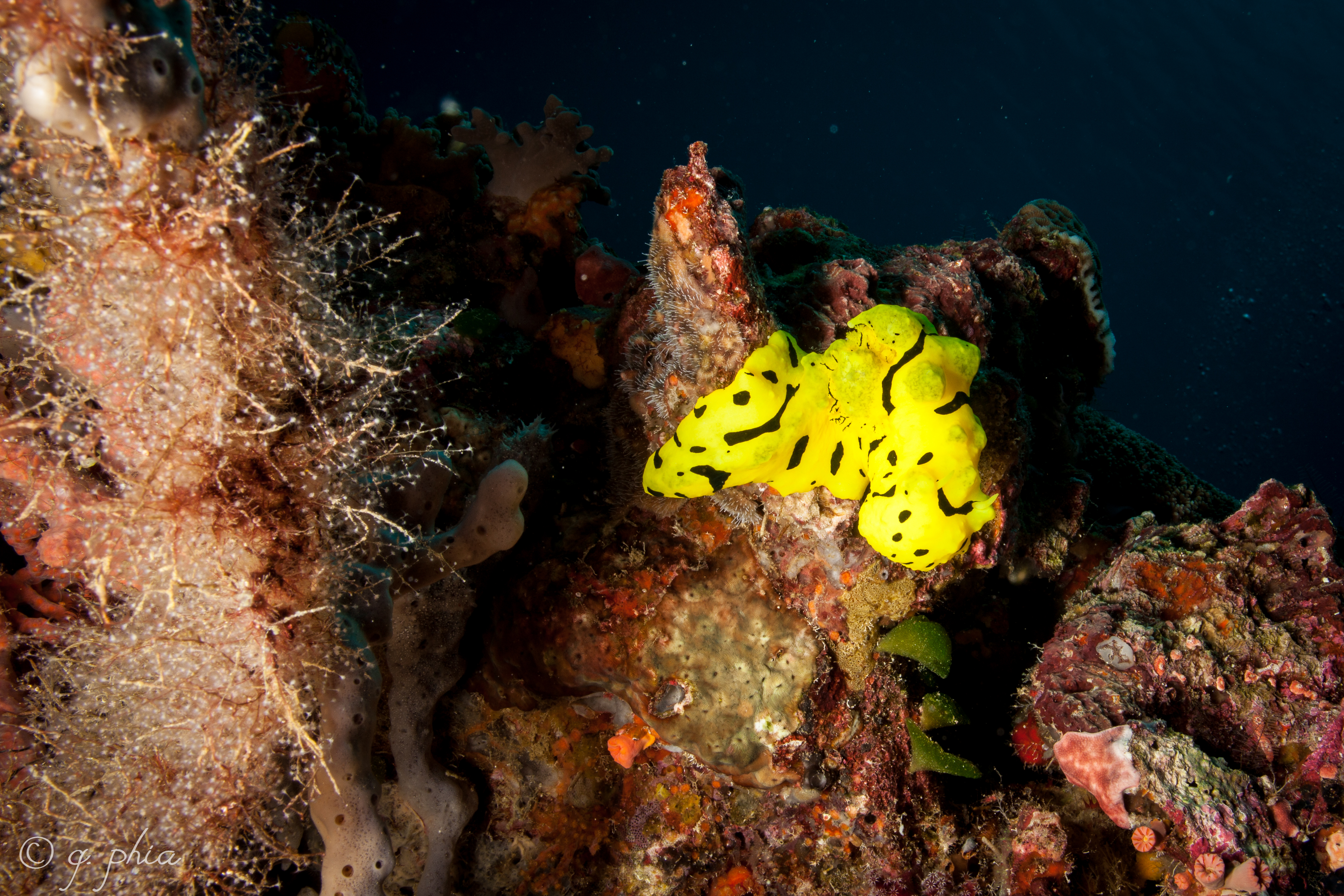
- Bajau Village Beaches in Wakatobi Wakatobi underwater

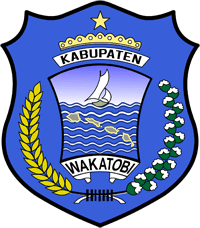
- Coat of arms

- Location within Southeast Sulawesi

- Location in Sulawesi and Indonesia Wakatobi Regency (Indonesia)
- Coordinates: 5°32′09″S 123°45′29″E
- Country: Indonesia
- Province: Southeast Sulawesi
- Capital: Wangi-Wangi

Government
  - Regent: Haliana
  - Vice Regent: Safia Wulao

Area
  - Total: 473.62 km^{2} (182.87 sq mi)

Population (mid 2025 estimate)
  - Total: 119,070
  - Density: 251.40/km^{2} (651.13/sq mi)
- Time zone: UTC+8 (ICST)
- Area code: (+62) 401
- Website: wakatobikab.go.id

Wakatobi Regency is a group of ca. 150 islands forming an administrative regency located in Southeast Sulawesi Province of Indonesia. The four largest islands are Wangi-wangi, Kaledupa, Tomia and Binongko, and the official name of the regency is a contraction of WAngi-Wangi, KAledupa, TOmia and BInongko; the islands were traditionally known as the Tukang Besi islands. The capital of the regency is located on Wangi-wangi Island, and was established by virtue of Law of the Republic of Indonesia Number 29 of 2003 dated 18 December 2003.

The regency has a total land area of 473.62 square kilometres and had a population of 92,922 at the 2010 Census and 111,402 at the 2020 Census; the official estimate as at mid 2025 was 119,070 (comprising 59,210 males and 59,870 females).

Wakatobi is also the name of a national park established in 1996, with a total area of 1.39 million hectares that lie within the marine biodiversity hotspot known as Wallacea. The coral reefs condition and scale are one of the highest priorities of marine conservation in Indonesia. The Wakatobi Islands are a part of the Coral Triangle, which has some of the richest marine biodiversity on earth.

== History of Region ==
Before becoming an autonomous regency, the Wakatobi Regency was known as the Tukang Besi Islands. The name Wakatobi is an acronym of the names of the four main islands that form the archipelago: WAngi-wangi, KAledupa, TOmia, and BInongko.

The Pre-Independence Period

In the pre-independence period, Wakatobi was under the authority of the Sultanate of Buton.

The Post-Independence Period

After Indonesia gained independence, and Southeast Sulawesi was established as a province, the Wakatobi group of islands then constituted several administrative districts within the territory of the Regency of Buton.

The Reform Period

On 18 December 2003, Wakatobi was officially formed into one of three new regencies in Southeast Sulawesi that were established by virtue of the Law of the Republic of Indonesia Number 29 of 2003 - the Regency of Bombana, the Regency of Wakatobi and the Regency of North Kolaka. When first established, Wakatobi only consisted of five districts namely the districts of Wangi-Wangi, Wangi-Wangi Selatan, Kaledupa, Tomia and Binongko. In 2005, by virtue of the Regulation of the Regency of Wakatobi Number 19 of 2005, the District of South Kaledupa was established; by virtue of the Regulation of the Regency of Wakatobi Number 20 of 2005, the District of East Tomia was established; and in 2007, by virtue of the Regulation of the Regency of Wakatobi Number 41 of 2007, the District of Togo Binongko was established which brought the total number of districts in the Regency of Wakatobi to eight districts, which are divided into 101 villages (76 desa and 25 kelurahan).

The Government at the Early Establishment

The Government of the Regency of Wakatobi as an autonomous region was officially marked by the inauguration of Syarifudin Safaa, SH, MM, as acting Regent of Wakatobi from 19 January 2004 until 19 January 2006. It was subsequently continued by H. LM. Mahufi Madra, SH, MH, as the substitute from 19 January 2006 until 28 June 2006.

The Government resulting from the Regional Head Elections

On the basis of the results of direct regional head elections; on 28 June 2006, the elected Regent and Vice Regent of Wakatobi – Ir. Hugua and Ediarto Rusmin, BAE – were inaugurated by the Governor of Southeast Sulawesi Ali Mazi, SH on behalf of the Minister of Home Affairs and by virtue of the Ministerial Decree of the Minister of Home Affairs Number 132.74-314 dated 13 June 2006 on the Confirmation of the Appointment of Ir. Hugua as the Regent of Wakatobi and by virtue of the Ministerial Decree of the Minister of Home Affairs Number 132.74-315 dated 13 June 2006 on the Confirmation of the Appointment of Ediarto Rusmin BAE as Vice Regent of Wakatobi for the tenure of 2006–2011. The current regional leadership of the Regency of Wakatobi is assumed by the tandem of Ir. Hugua as Regent and H. Arhawi, SE as Vice Regent, since inaugurated by the Governor of Southeast Sulawesi, H. Nur Alam, SE, on 28 June 2011 on behalf of the Minister of Home Affairs and by virtue of the Ministerial Decree of the 132.74-403, dated 30 May 2011 on the Confirmation of the Appointment of Ir. Hugua as the Regent of Wakatobi dan H. Arhawi, SE as Vice Regent of Wakatobi for the tenure of 2011–2016.

== State of the Region ==
Location. The Regency of Wakatobi is an archipelago located to the southeast of Sulawesi. Geographically, the Regency lies south of the Equator, stretching latitudinally from 5º12´ to 6º25´ South Latitude (over ± 160 kilometers) and transversing longitudinally from 123º20´ to 124º39´ East Longitude (over ± 120 kilometers).

Area. The land area of the Regency extends to 473.62 square kilometres. The water area is estimated at 17,554 square kilometres.

Boundaries.

Boundaries	Region
North	Buton Regency and North Buton Regency
South	Flores Sea
West	Buton Regency
East	Banda Sea

Climate. Wakatobi has two seasons, the rainy and dry seasons, just like other regions of Indonesia. Generally, land in Wakatobi is between 3 and 350 meters above sea level and is located below the Equator. Hence it has a tropical climate.

== Regional Demographics ==
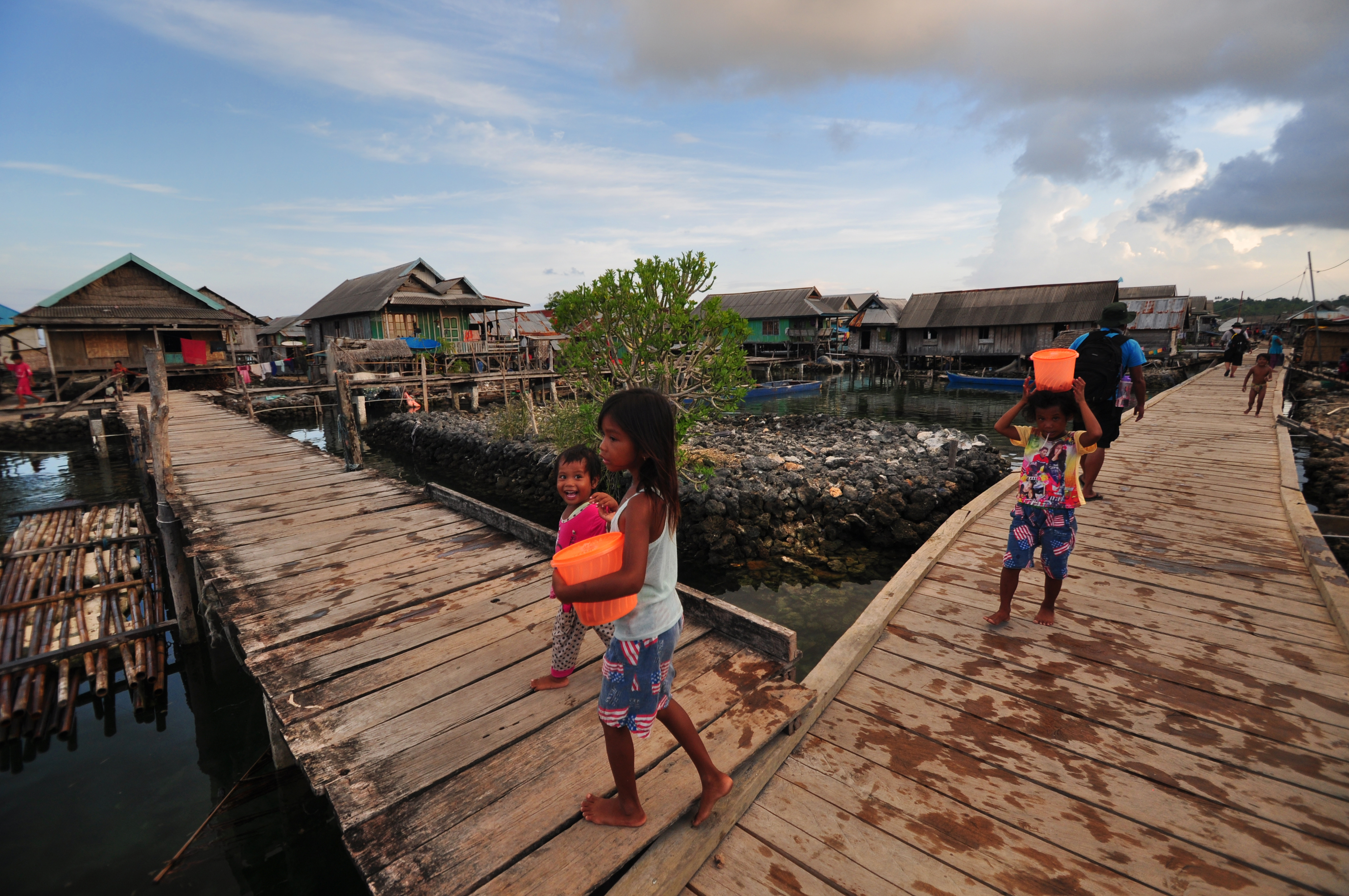
Daily Activity Bajau Tribe in Bajau Sampela Village

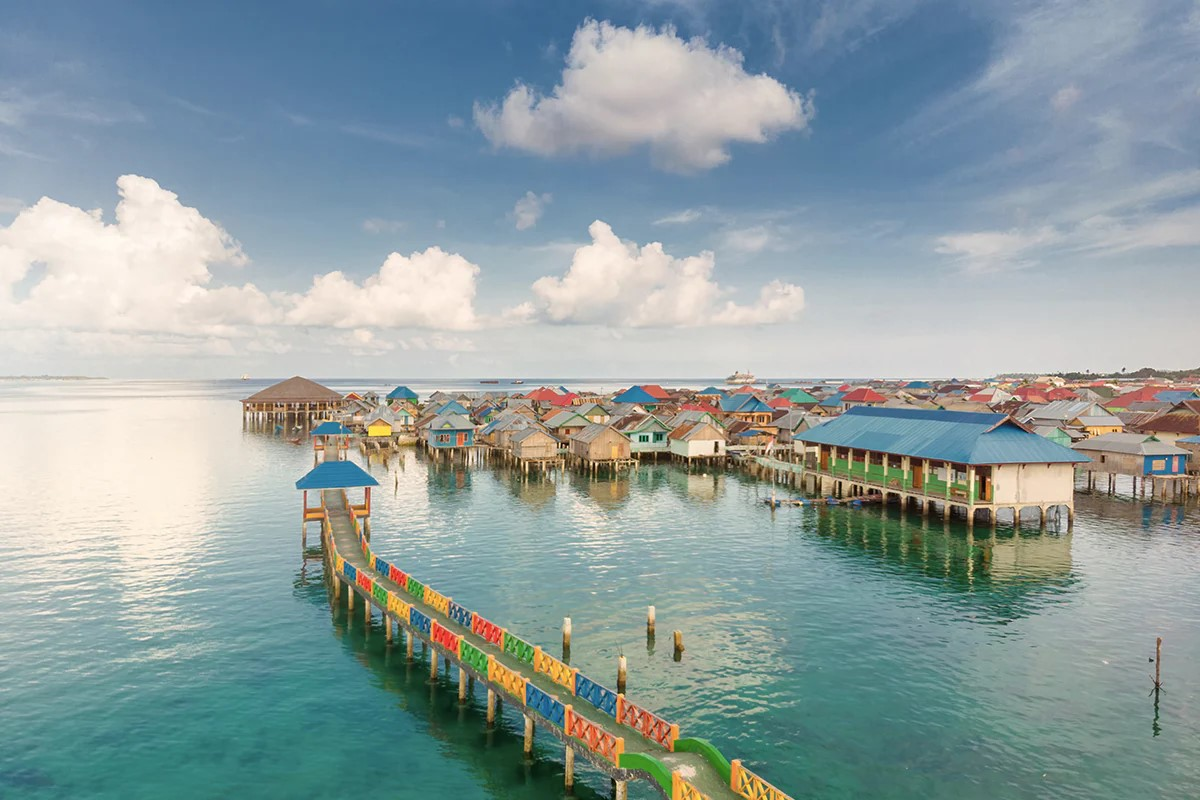
The settlement of the Bajo tribe in Mola, Wangiwangi Island, Wakatobi

Total Population. The population of the Regency of Wakatobi, based on the Population Census of 2010, totalled 92,995 inhabitants, consisting of 44,640 male and 48,355 female inhabitants. At the 2020 Census, the population grew to 111,402 inhabitants; the official estimate as at mid 2025 was 119,070. The most populated area in 2025 was the District of South Wangi-Wangi, while the least populated was the District of Togo Binongko.

Population distribution. Over half of the regency's population are on Wangi-wangi Island (in the Districts of Wangi-wangi and South Wangi-Wangi). The average population density of the Regency of Wakatobi in 2025 was 251.4 inhabitants per square kilometre. The districts with the densest populations in 2025 were Wangi-Wangi with 447.28 inhabitants per km^{2}, Kaledupa with 347.81 per km^{2}, South Wangi-Wangi with 271.66 per km^{2}, Tomia with 255.12 per km^{2}, and East Tomia with 205.00 per km^{2}.

Age, gender, and ethnicity. The population structure in 2025 showed that 67.82 percent or 80,750 of the population were in the group of productive age of between 15 and 64 years old. The total population of Wakatobi in 2011, based on gender, was 45,944 male and 49,768 female inhabitants. There are eight ethnic groups inhabiting the Regency of Wakatobi. Based on data of 2000, out of a population of 87,793, the largest ethnic groups were Wakatobi with 91.33 percent and Bajau with 7.92 percent, with other ethnicities totalling less than 1 percent.

Employment. The working age population in 2025 consisted of 80,750 persons, of which 40,360 were male or 49.98 percent and 40,390 were female or 50.02 percent. There was a workforce of 64,924 persons that consists of 62,446 employed persons or 96.18 percent or 77.33 percent persons of the working age population, and 2,478 persons or 3.82 percent of open unemployment. There is a non workforce of 23,036 persons or 28.53 percent of the working age that consists of 5,102 students, 13,735 persons who take care of their households and 4,199 engaged in other activities. Viewed from the domains of work that absorb the largest workforces, agriculture involved 22,669 persons, manufacturing 10,460 persons, and services 29,317 persons.

== Administrative Divisions ==
There are eight districts (kecamatan) with each of the four main islands being split into two districts, listed below from north to south with their areas and their populations at the 2010 Census and 2020 Census, together with the official estimates as at mid 2025. The table also includes the location of the district administrative centres, the number of administrative villages (totaling 26 urban kelurahan and 75 rural desa) and of named islands within each district, and its postal code.

Kode Wiulayah	Name of District (kecamatan)	Area in km^{2}	Pop'n Census 2010	Pop'n Census 2020	Pop'n Estimate mid 2025	District admin centre	No. of kelurahan	No. of desa	No. of islands	Post code
74.07.01	Wangi-Wangi	67.49	23,362	28,100	30,190	Wanci	6	14	5	93791
74.07.05	Wangi-Wangi Selatan (South Wangi-Wangi)	123.55	24,637	30,824	33,560	Mandati	3	18	31	93795
74.07.02	Kaledupa	35.18	9,999	11,729	12,240	Ambeua	4	12	11	93792
74.07.06	Kaledupa Selatan (South Kaledupa)	56.08	6,644	8,051	8,590	Sandi	-	10	5	93790
74.07.03	Tomia	32.82	6,907	7,908	8,370	Waha	2	8	54	93793
74.07.07	Tomia Timur (East Tomia)	46.02	8,460	9,169	9,430	Usuku	5	5	-	93797
74.07.04	Binongko	68.63	8,385	10,076	10,780	Rukuwa	4	5	2	93794
74.07.08	Togo Binongko	43.85	4,701	5,545	5,910	Popalia	2	3	31	93796
	Totals	473.62	92,922	111,402	119,070		26	75	150	

== Regional Economic Potentials ==
Agriculture, plantation, and forestry

Out of the cultivation of five crops, cassava produces the highest yield with 40,199 tons in 2003. It is followed by corn with 1,715 tons, sweet potato with 58 tons, rice and peanut with 8 tons and 4 tons respectively. In 2003, the highest yield-producing fruits were mango with 9,229 quintals, banana with 5,788 quintals, and orange with 4,134 quintals. The most produced vegetables were long beans with 229 quintals, eggplant with 210 quintals, kale with 205 quintals, and red onion (shallot) with 160 quintals. In 2003, the highest community plantation production was 225 tons of coconut, 59 tons of cashew, 8 tons of hybrid coconut, 6 tons of cacao, 3 tons of coffee, and 0.35 tons of nutmeg. The forestry type in 2003 consisted only of a protected forest with an area of 11,300 hectares.

Livestock and fishery

The large livestock population in 2003 consisted only of 308 cows. Compared to the population in 2002, the number of cows increased 60.42 percent, from 192 cows in 2002 to 308 cows in 2003. The small livestock population in 2003 consisted only of 9,789 goats. Compared to the population in 2002, the number of goats decreased 5.43 percent, from 10,351 goats in 2002 to 9,789 goats in 2003. The fisheries production in 2003 amounted to 17,985.60 tons that consisted of 17,453.60 tons of marine fisheries and 532 tons of marine aquaculture products in the form of seaweeds.

Industry and energy

Up to 2003, there had not been any large or medium-sized industries, there were only small-sized industries and home industries. The small-sized industries amounted to 107 units with 514 workers, and the home industries amounted to 1,290 units with 1,863 workers. In 2003, the number of State Electricity consumers reached 9,652 clients with the installed capacity of 6,047,905 VA. Meanwhile, the electricity production amounted to 6,278,762 kWh with the sold electricity capacity amounting to 5,367,403 kWh and the sales value reaching Rp 2,791,737,755 thousand.

Trade

In 2003, the traded commodity volume totalled 233,650.13 tons with a value of Rp 28.639.873 thousand. Forestry products recorded the highest sales amounting to 231,529.68 tons with a value of Rp 13,761,355 thousand. Agricultural commodities consisting of food crops posted the second highest transactions, reaching 1,355.29 tons with a value of Rp 3,756,470 thousand. Meanwhile, the least traded commodity products were from plantation that amounted to 9.59 tons with a value of Rp 1,902,403 thousand, and followed by cattle farming that only reached 3.95 tons with a value of Rp 5,928 thousand.

== Regional Tourism Potentials ==
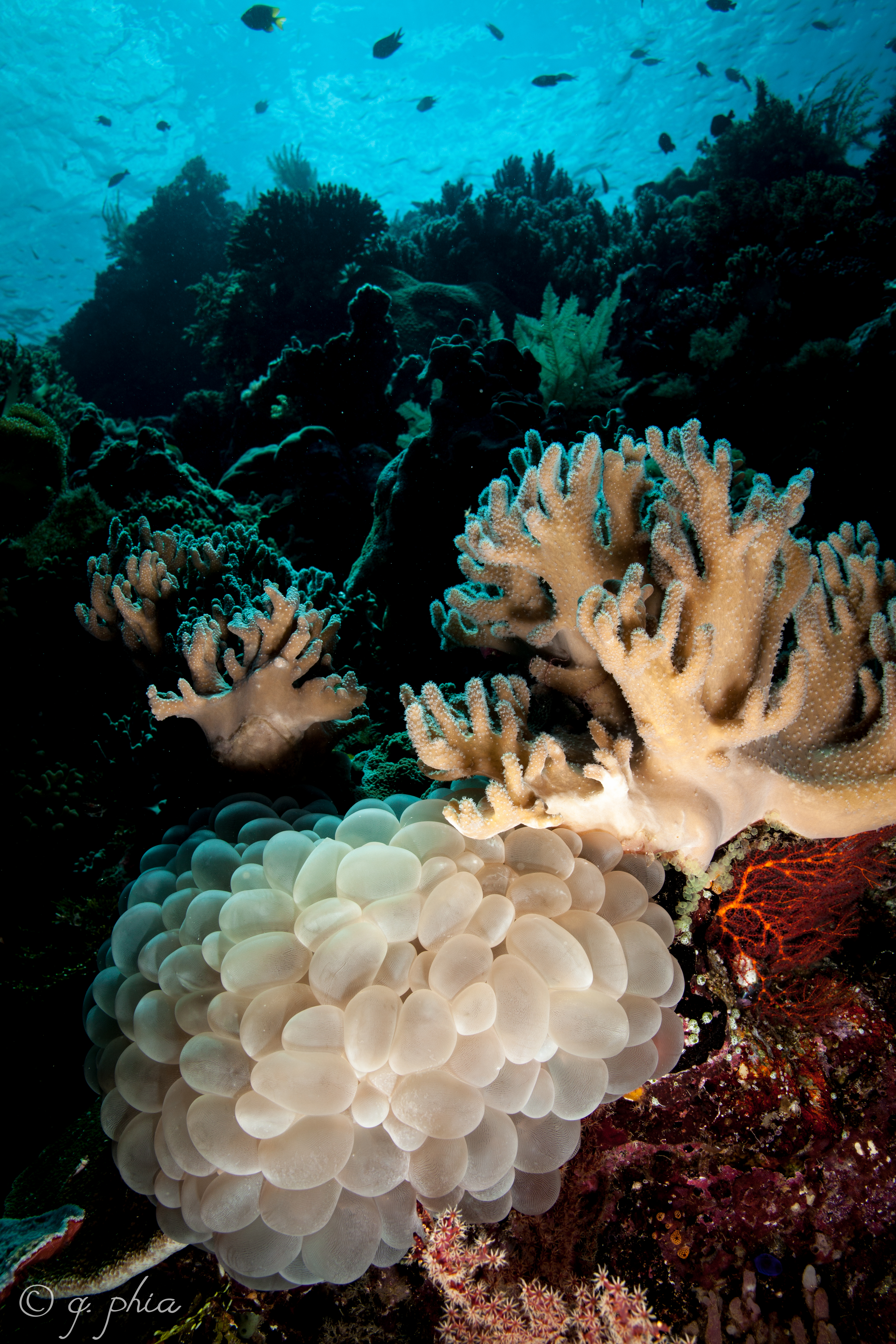
Coral reefs in the Wakatobi sea

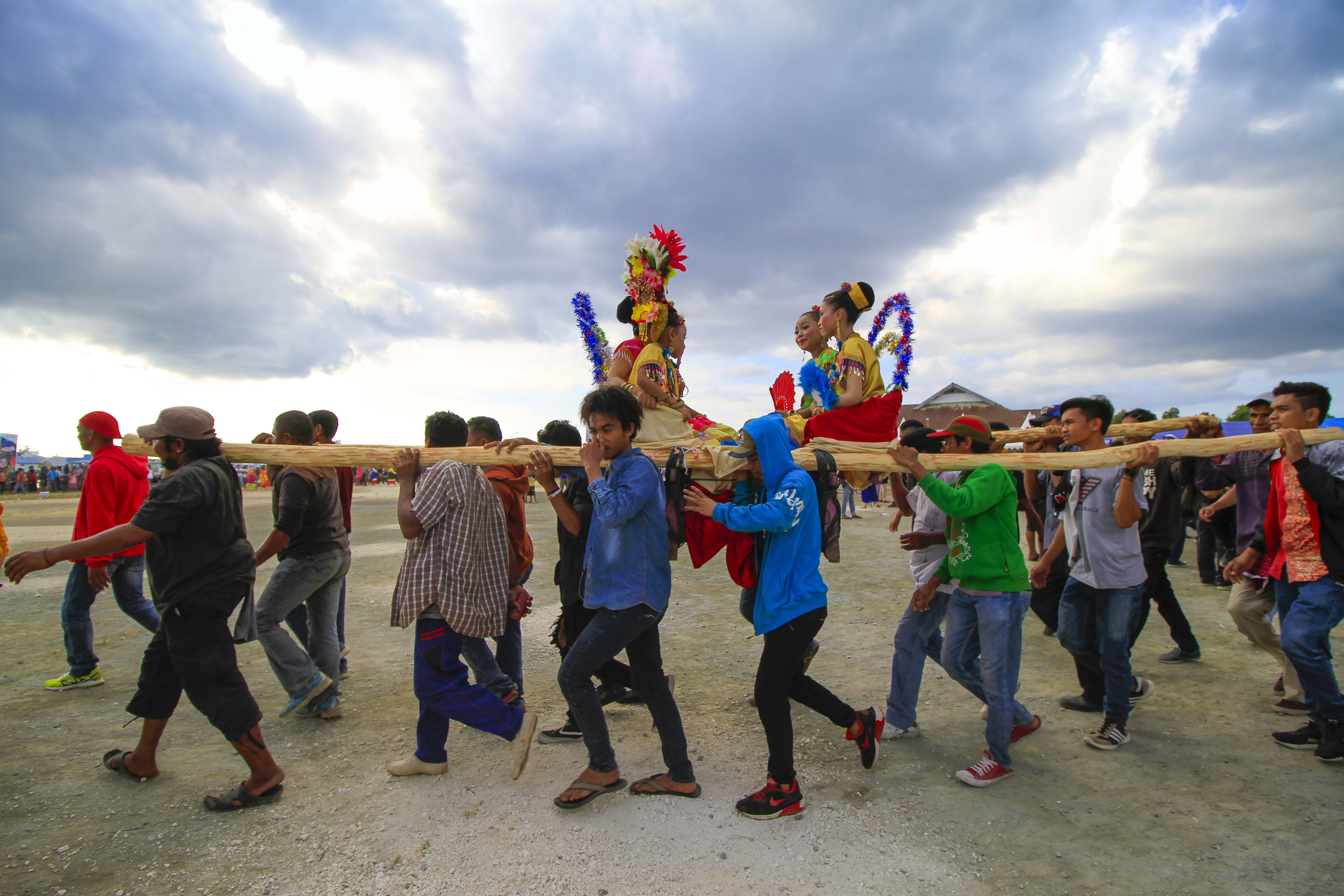
Karia'a Tradition, one of the List of Intangible Cultural Heritage of Indonesia.

In 2025, tourists who came to Wakatobi Regency were 13,378 persons.

Wakatobi National Park. The Wakatobi National Park is one of 50 National Parks in Indonesia, which is located in the Regency of Wakatobi, Southeast Sulawesi. It officially became a National Park in 1996 and has a total area of 1,39 million hectares. It possesses a marine biodiversity with a scale and condition that ranks it as one of the highest priorities in marine conservation in Indonesia. The depth of waters in this national park varies, with the deepest part reaching 1,044 meters below sea level. The Wakatobi National Park features:

1. Coral Reefs;
2. Fishes;
3. Other animals;
4. Specificality; and
5. Hoga Island.

Wakatobi Biosphere Reserve. Wakatobi has been designated in the World Network of Biosphere Reserves by the Man and the Biosphere Programme of the United Nations Educational, Scientific and Cultural Organization (UNESCO) on 11 July 2012. The world's major ecosystem types and landscapes represented in this Network are devoted to conserving biological diversity, promoting research and monitoring, as well as seeking to provide models of sustainable development in the service of humankind.

== Historical Tours ==
=== Wangi-Wangi Island ===
Tindoi Fort

Tindoi Fort is one of the cultural destinations situated in the Wangi-Wangi District. It is located approximately 5 kilometers from the city's downtown and can be reached by motorcycle or car in around a 15-minute ride.

Liya Fort and Keraton Liya Mosque

Liya Fort is situated in Liya Togo Village, South Wangi-Wangi District. This fort consists of four layers of walls with 12 Lawa (doors), which serve as the exit doors for royalties of the kingdom to interact with the surrounding commoners. Within the premises of fort stands the Keraton Liya Mosque, which is situated 8 kilometers from the regency's capital and can be reached by using motorcycle or car.

Mandati Tonga Fort

Mandati Tonga Fort is situated in Mandati Village, South Wangi-Wangi District. This fort has a rectangular shape with an area of approximately 1 hectare. The highest fort wall stands about 7 meters tall and is located in the western and southern sections.

Togo Molengo Fort

Togo Molengo Fort is perched high at the peak of Mount Kapota Island. It can be reached by a 20-minute traditional boat ride from Wangi-Wangi, and then by a 10-minute motorcycle ride.

Lighthouse

The lighthouse was built during the Dutch colonial era, in 1901. This tourism destination is located in Waha Village, Wangi-Wangi District, some 8 kilometers away from the regency's capital, and can be reached in a 15-minute motorcycle ride.

=== Kaledupa Island ===
Old Cemetery Kamali

The Old Cemetery and Kamali are situated in Pale’a Village, South Kaledupa District.

Ollo Fort and Old Mosque

The Ollo Fort and Old Mosque are two historical sites that constitute the cultural heritage of the Kaledupa Island society, which until now is still maintained and preserved by the local community. Within the premises of the Ollo Fort stands an Old Mosque measuring 6,5 by 7 meters.

La Donda Fort

La Donda Fort is one of the historical sites that constitute a cultural heritage of the Kaledupa Island community.

=== Tomia Island ===
Patua Fort

The Patua Fort is a cultural historic site of the Tomia community.

Suo-Sou Fort

The Suo-Suo Fort is situated in Kahianga Village, East Tomia District. It is located 3 kilometers away from the district capital and can be reached by a motorcycle ride from the subdistrict capital.

Onemay Old Mosque

The Onemay Old Mosque is situated in Onemay Subdistrict, Tomia District.

=== Binongko Island ===
Palahidu Fort

Palahidu Fort is one of the historical heritages of the Binongko community that is situated in Palahidu Village, Binongko District. The Fort nestles on the northern part cliff of the Binongko Island seashore.

Wali Fort

Wali Fort is one of the historical sites that constitutes a heritage of the Togo Binongko community.

== Cultural Destination ==
=== Kaledupa Island ===
Kaledupa Island exudes a cultural charm that is still maintained and preserved by the local community. The following are cultural tourism destinations that exist in Kaledupa Island.

Kaledupa Traditional Dance

- Lariangi Dance

Lariangi dance is a traditional dance from Kaledupa District that was first choreographed in 1634 during the rule of the first King of Buton, Wa Kaka.

- Hebalia Dance

Hebalia dance is a traditional dance from Kaledupa District that was composed by the local shamans in ancient times.

- Sombo Bungkale Dance

Sombo Bungkale dance is a traditional dance from South Kaledupa District, which is performed by twelve beautiful female dancers.

Customary Festivities and Traditions

- Karia'a Customary Festivity

The Karia’a customary festivity is a typical tradition of the Kaledupa community to mark the coming of age of boys through circumcision. In this festivity, boys are paraded in the village on stretchers carried collectively by 15 to 20 persons.

- Pencak Silat Customary Tradition

The pencak silat tradition is a customary tradition performed by the Kaledupa community.

=== Tomia Island ===
- Safara Customart Festivity

The Safara customary festivity is a traditional feast of the Tomia community performed in every month of Safar (Islamic lunar month).

- Bose-Bose Tradition

Bose-Bose is a tradition performed by decorating boats with colourful ornaments and loading them with traditional culinary dishes, such as Liwo, and then parading them along the coasts from Patipelong Quay towards Usuku Quay and up to One Mobaa Strait, while the people are beating drums. This traditional festivity is performed with the purpose of cleansing all of the sins of the people by taking them away with the sea water waves.

- Sajo Moane Dance

Sajo Moane dance is a sacred dance performed by male dancers.

- Saride Dance

Saride dance is a traditional dance symbolizing unity and togetherness in completing activities that are destined for the public interests.

=== Binongko Island ===
- Balumpa Dance

Balumpa dance is one of the traditional dances originating from Binongko Island.

== Local Infrastructure Facilities ==
=== Education ===
The number of kindergartens in 2003 totalled 22 units that are distributed in five districts with 47 teachers and 989 students. In 2003, the teacher-school ratio averaged 2; the student-school ratio averaged 45, and the student-teacher ratio averaged 21. For elementary education, the year 2003 recorded 101 schools, 684 teachers, and 14,742 students. In 2003, the teacher-school ratio averaged 7; the student-school ratio averaged 145, and the student-teacher ratio averaged 22.

For junior high school education, the year 2003 recorded 16 schools, 235 teachers, and 4,287 students. In 2003, the teacher-school ratio averaged 15; the student-school ratio averaged 268, and the student-teacher ratio averaged 18. For senior high school education, the year 2003 recorded 4 schools, 93 teachers and 2,212 students. In 2003, the teacher-school ratio averaged 23; the student-school ratio averaged 553, and the student-teacher ratio averaged 24.

=== Health ===
Until 2003, the Wakatobi Regency had not established any general hospital. There were, however, 7 Puskesmas (Community Health Center), 12 Puskesmas Pembantu (Community Health Sub-center), 5 doctors, 2 Public Health Graduates, 85 paramedics, and 9 paramedic assistants.

=== Religion ===
In 2003, the Wakatobi Regency had 112 Mosques and 22 Mushollah. It had, however, no Churches, Hindu temples, or Buddhist temples. This demonstrates that almost all of the Wakatobi people profess the Islamic religion.

== Government ==
=== Terms of Duty 2011-2016 ===
Wakatobi Regency is currently headed by Regent Ir. Hugua and Vice Regent H. Arhawi, S.E.

=== Gross Regional Domestic Product (GRDP) per Capita of 2003 ===
The Gross Regional Domestic Product (GRDP) of Wakatobi regency is measured based on the prevailing prices in 2003 that amounted to Rp 179,774,04, - million, slightly higher than the GRD recorded in the previous year, amounting to Rp 160,473.67 - million. Based on the prevailing prices at the time, the per capita GRDP of Wakatobi Regency in 2002 was Rp 1,833,775.23 GRDP and increased to Rp 2,026,993.35 in 2003, or increasing by 10.54 percent.

=== Local House of Representatives of Wakatobi Regency in 2004 ===
The regional elections for seats in the Local House of Representative of Wakatobi Regency in 2004 resulted in the following seat distribution based on the electoral party and electoral district: Golkar (Functional Group Party) received the most seats, 4 seats; followed by PBB (Crescent Star Party), PPP (United Development Party), PAN (National Mandate Party), PNBK (Freedom Bull National Party), PBR (Reform Star Party) and PDIP (Indonesian Democratic Party of Struggle) which gained 2 seats, while Merdeka (Freedom) Party, PKB (National Awakening Party), Pancasila Patriot Party and PD (Democratic Party) had one seat each in the 20-seat parliament.

=== Members of Local House of Representative of Wakatobi Regency for 2009-2014 ===
1. Muhamad Ali, SP, M.Si (PDIP, Indonesian Democratic Party of Struggle)
2. H. La India, S.Sos (PAN, National Mandate Party)
3. H. Sairuddin La Aba (PNBKI, Indonesian People Bull National Party)
4. Daryono Moane, S.Sos (PDIP, Indonesian Democratic Party of Struggle)
5. Laode Mas’udin (PDIP, Indonesian Democratic Party of Struggle)
6. Supardi (PDIP, Indonesian Democratic Party of Struggle)
7. H. La Ode Arifudin, S.Sos (PDIP, Indonesian Democratic Party of Struggle)
8. Haliadi Habirun (PAN, National Mandate Party)
9. H. Sunaidi (PAN, National Mandate Party)
10. Hasnun, S.Sos (PNBKI, Indonesian People Bull National Party)
11. Muhammad Shawwal, S.T. (PNBKI, Indonesian People Bull National Party)
12. Drs. H. Syafruddin (Golkar, Functional Group Party)
13. Dra.H. Safia Wualo (Golkar, Functional Group Party)
14. Sutomo Hadi, S.Sos (PBR, Reform Star Party)
15. Zakaria, SH., M.H. (PBR, Reform Star Party)
16. La Moane Sabara, S.Sos. (PD, Democratic Party)
17. Subarudin Bau, S.Pd., M.Si. (PD, Democratic Party)
18. Musdin, S. Pd., M.M. (PPD, Regional Union Party)
19. Andi Hasan, S.Pd (PPD, Regional Union Party)
20. Hj. Ernawati Rasyid (PPDI, Indonesian Democratic Guard Party)
21. Haerudin Konde, S.T. (PKS, Prosperious Justice Party)
22. H. Munsir (PKB, National Awakening Party)
23. La Ke (Barnas Party)
24. Hairudin Buton, S.Sos. (PPNUI, United Indonesian Nahdatul Ummah Party)
25. H. Sukiman (Hanura, People's Conscience Party)

== Flight Hub ==
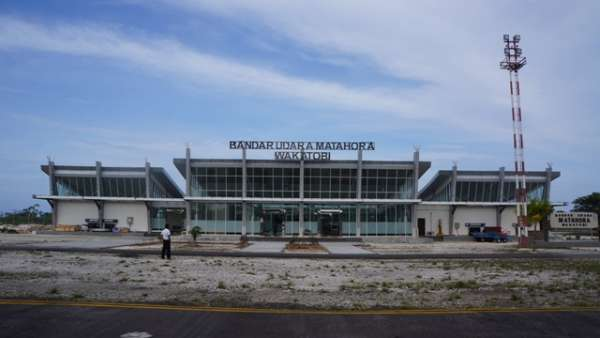
Matahora Airport

The main flight hub of the Wakatobi archipelago is Matahora Airport on Wangi-wangi Island. Wings Air is currently the only airline flying to Matahora Airport. Flying is the fastest way to visit Wakatobi, alternatively 12 hours by several boats from Kendari to Baubau and then to Wakatobi. From Wangi-wangi Island to Kaledupa Island takes 2 hours by boat and to Tomia 4 hours by boat. Maranggo Airport is a separate private airstrip on Tomia Island which is used exclusively to transport visitors of the Wakatobi Dive Resort.

== Activities ==
Sail Wakatobi-Belitong will be held in Wakatobi in July 2011 and in Belitung Island in August 2011. Wakatobi will make a mass wedding under the sea event. As a part of Sail Wakatobi-Belitong, the organizing committee launch also International undersea photo contest with theme: "The Beauty of Under Water World Coral Reef Triangle" and will be initialized after the Sail Wakatobi-Belitong is launched on July 16, 2011. To support Sail Wakatobi-Belitong, Transportation ministry has given fund Rp.70 billion ($8.1 million) to improve Wangi-Wangi port, Kaledupa port and Tomea Island port which will be finished before the event runs.

The Wakatobi is also home to Operation Wallacea, a UK based for non-profit conservation group looking at sustainable development of fisheries and coral reef research.

== In popular culture ==
A collaborative movie work of WWF-Indonesia, the Wakatobi administration and SET Film Workshop, The Mirror Never Lies, has portrayed the marine biodiversity with underwater scenery around the Wakatobi Islands and the life of the Bajo tribe, the sea nomads who rely entirely on marine resources for survival. The Mirror Never Lies got an Honorable Mention at the Global Film Initiative.
