= Muna people =

Ethnic group of Indonesia

Muna people Wuna people
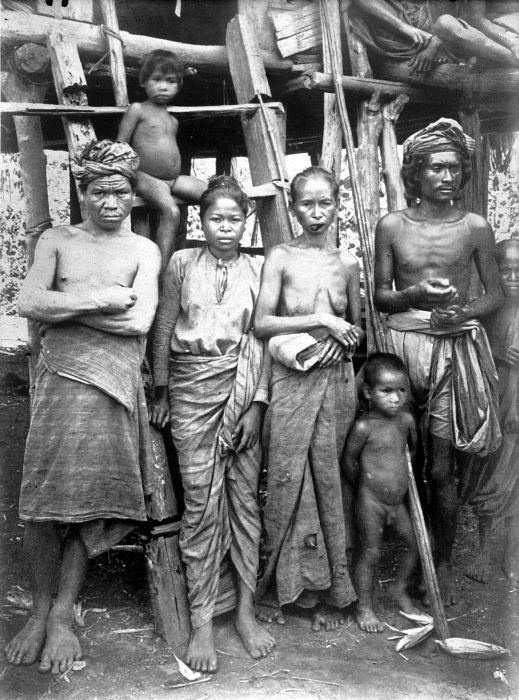
- Residents of the Muna Island, Southeast Sulawesi, Indonesia.

Total population
- 321,000

Regions with significant populations
- Indonesia: Southeast Sulawesi (Buton & Muna Island); Maluku Islands

Languages
- Muna–Buton languages (Busoa language, Kaimbulawa language, Liabuku language, Muna language, Pancana language, Kioko language), Indonesian language

Religion
- Islam (predominantly)

Related ethnic groups
- Bonerate people, Butonese people

The Muna or Wuna are the indigenous group which primarily inhabit the islands of Buton and Muna. They speak languages from the Muna-Buton language group.

== Connections with Other groups ==
The Muna language is a member of the Celebic languages in the Austronesian family, which is only found in Indonesia. This language is mainly used by the Muna people on Muna Island and its surroundings, in the province of Southeast Sulawesi. Muna language speakers are spread across Muna Island and the west coast of Buton Island, covering Muna Regency, West Muna, Buton, North Buton, Central Buton, and Bau-Bau City.

However, from the physical appearance of the body, skull, skin color (dark brown), and hair (curly or wavy) it appears that the aboriginal Muna people are closer to the ethnic groups of Polynesians and Melanesians in the Pacific and Aboriginal Australians compared to the Buginese or Malays. This is evident by the similarities of the people and their culture with of those in the East Nusa Tenggara, and the islands of Timor and Flores generally. Woven sarong motifs found in East Nusa Tenggara and Muna Island share similar features such as horizontal lines with basic colors of yellow, green, red, and black. The shape of their headwear also has a resemblance to each other. Since before until today, Muna fishermen often harvest sea cucumbers and go fishing up to the waters of Darwin, Australia in the Timor Sea. This has caused Muna fishermen to have been arrested several times in these waters by the Australian government. These habits may probably indicate the existence of a traditional relationship between the Muna people with Aboriginal Australians.

== Culture ==
Traditional kite flying of the Muna people is called the Kaghati Kolope (Kolope leaf kite), as it is made from Dioscorea hispida leaf. It is thought that the kaghati kolope were used by the farmers as a means of entertainment while looking after their field. Apart from that, it is believed that the kaghati kolope will transform into an umbrella to protect its owner from the sun in the afterlife.

=== Karia ceremony ===
In Muna communities, there are ceremonies corresponding to different stages of individuals' lives, beginning with the ceremony of birth and ending with the ceremony of death. One of these stages is the advancement from childhood to adulthood. Women make this transition via the ritual of Karia, which is referred to as Pusuo by the Butonese people.

Karia is a ritual women perform at the age of 15-16 by secluding themselves for 96 hours. They do so with the aid of a Pomantoto, whose job is to instruct them over the course of twelve processions on parenting and Muna virtues, including social unity, self-realization, and caretaking. It is believed in Muna society that a woman should not be married if she has not undergone the process of Karia. If her seclusion is interrupted, the woman undergoing the ceremony will face exclusion and be ostracized within her community.

=== Kasambu tradition ===
Kasambu is a transition ritual held by the Muna people in Southeast Sulawesi, Indonesia. This tradition is a form of thanksgiving for the safety of the wife who will be giving birth to her first child. It is usually held before the birth of the child, most often in the 7th or 8th month. Prior to this stage of the pregnancy, both husband and wife will bathe together. The Kasambu procession begins with the spouses feeding each other. Food given in this way must be finished. If it is not finished by the wife or husband, the rest is given to the children that are present around them. The act of feeding one another is then continued by the rest of the family.

Kasambu serves to bring together the families of soon-to-be parents and introduce the unborn child to the circle of family that they will be raised into. It brings well wishes and blessings for the child as well as for the safety of both the mother and child in delivery. Finally the procession is ended with a prayer by a priest or imam.

=== Pregnancy ===
Pregnancy is considered a blessing by the Muna people and is celebrated by family members as well as sometimes neighbors. Popular Muna belief holds that women undergoing pregnancy are highly susceptible to malevolent influences, which are drawn to the smell of the pregnant woman. Expecting mothers minimize their risk by keeping garlic with them and wearing protective pins.

== Notable people ==
- Saddil Ramdani, Indonesian footballer
