= Butonese =

Butonese can refer to:

- Butonese people from Buton, Southeast Sulawesi, Indonesia.
- Butonese languages, a group of languages spoken by both Muna people and Butonese people
- Butonese language, also known as Wolio language.
