= Muna language =

Austronesian language spoken on Muna island, Indonesia

Muna
- Wamba Wuna
- Native to: Sulawesi, Indonesia
- Region: Muna Island, Buton Island
- Native speakers: 270,000 (2010 census)
- Language family: Austronesian: Malayo-Polynesian; Celebic; Muna–Buton; Munan; Munic; Western; Muna

Language codes
- ISO 639-3: mnb
- Glottolog: muna1247

Muna is an Austronesian language spoken principally on the island of Muna as well as North-west Buton Island, off the southeast coast of Sulawesi in Indonesia. The language is well-documented, especially by linguist René van den Berg. In 2010, the language had around 270,000 speakers.

== Classification ==
Muna belongs to the Muna–Buton subgroup, which is a branch of the larger Celebic subgroup. Within the Muna–Buton languages, Muna is the largest member of the Munic subbranch, which also includes smaller languages such as Pancana, Kioko, Liabuku, Kaimbulawa, and Busoa.

Muna forms a dialect web with the other languages of Sulawesi and Buton.

== Dialects ==
Muna has three dialects:

- The "Standard" Muna is the most widely spoken, found in the northern and central part of Muna Island, as well as on the northwestern coast of Buton Island and in 1989 had around 150,000 speakers
- the Tiworo dialect, spoken on Muna in the northwestern Tikep district with about 10,000 speakers
- southern Muna, with two subdialects: and Siompu (~7000 speakers) and the various Gumas dialects (~60,000 speakers)

Differences between these dialects are mostly lexical, but also phonological.

== Health ==
In the Ethnologue database, Muna is classified "threatened" in category 6b, meaning "The language is used for face-to-face communication within all generations, but it is losing users." The language of instruction in academia in Muna-speaking areas in Indonesian, except in lower forms but Muna is being taught in some primary schools and thus being acquired by the next generation.

Despite the fact that Indonesian is used in schools, Muna is the dominant language and is spoken in all other areas. The vast majority of the population of Muna is fluent in the languages, but not all are fluent in Indonesian Despite its small population and the fact that it is not used as the main medium of instruction in schools, the Muna language does not seem to be in immediate danger. Its population of fluent speakers on the island has stayed fairly stable between 1989 and 2007.

== Phonology ==
=== Consonants ===
Muna has the following consonant phonemes.

Consonants
			Labial	Lamino- dental	Alveolar	Palatal	Velar	Uvular	Glottal
Plosive	voiceless	plain	p		t	(c)	k		
Plosive	voiceless	prenasalized	ᵐp		ⁿt		ᵑk		
Plosive	voiced	plain	b	d̪ ⟨dh⟩	d	(ɟ)	g		
Plosive	voiced	prenasalized	ᵐb		ⁿd		ᵑg		
Plosive	voiced	implosive	ɓ ⟨bh⟩						
Fricative	voiceless	plain	f		s				h
Fricative	voiceless	prenasalized			ⁿs				
Fricative	voiced							ʁ ⟨gh⟩	
Nasal			m		n		ŋ ⟨ng⟩		
Trill					r				
Lateral					l				
Approximant			ʋ ⟨w⟩			(j) ⟨y⟩			

Notes:

- The phoneme /ʋ/ is realized as a labiodental approximant [ʋ] before unrounded vowels, and as a bilabial approximant [β̞] before rounded vowels.
- In rapid speech, the sequences /bu, pu, mbu, mpu/ have trilled allophones [ʙu, ʙ̥u, mʙu, mʙ̥u] in stressed position.
- In the alveolar column, /t/ and /ⁿt/ are actually apico-dental.

=== Vowels ===
The vowel inventory comprises five vowels: /a/, /i/, /u/, /e/, /o/. They can freely combine into sequences of two or three vowels. Sequences of two like vowels are pronounced as a long vowel, e.g. tuu [tu:] 'knee'. In sequences of three vowels, there is an optional non-phonemic glottal stop after the first vowel, e.g. nokoue [noko(ʔ)ue] 'it has veins'.

=== Syllable structure ===
Like many other languages on Sulawesi, Muna only has open syllables of the types CV (consonant-vowel) and V (vowel), e.g. kaindea /ka.i.ⁿde.a/ 'plantation', padamalala /pa.da.ma.la.la/ 'citronella', akumadiuandae /a.ku.ma.di.u.a.ⁿda.e/ 'I will wash them with it'. Loanwords from Malay/Indonesian and other source languages are adapted to the syllable structure of Muna: karadhaa /karad̪aa/ < Malay kerja 'work', kantori /kaⁿtori/ < Malay kantor 'office' (from Dutch kantoor), wakutuu /wakutuu/ < Malay waktu 'time' (from Arabic waqt).

== Grammar ==
=== Verbs ===
Verbs are inflected for mood and person (of both subject and object). Person marking is strictly nominative–accusative: person marking prefixes indicate the subject of transitive and intransitive verbs, while person marking suffixes are used to mark the direct and indirect object.

There are three verb classes, which have slightly different forms for the subject prefix. The classes are named after the first person singular prefix.

	a-class		ae-class		ao-class	
	realis	irrealis	realis	irrealis	realis	irrealis
1.sg.	a-	a-	ae-	ae-	ao-	ao-
2.sg.fam.	o-	o-	ome-	ome-	omo-	omo-
2.sg.hon.	to-	ta-	te-	tae-	to-	tao-
3.sg.	no-	na-	ne-	nae-	no-	nao-
1.du.incl.	do-	da-	de-	dae-	do-	dao-
1.pl.incl.	do- -Vmu	da- -Vmu	de- -Vmu	dae- -Vmu	do- -Vmu	dao- -Vmu
1.pl.excl.	ta-	ta-	tae-	tae-	tao-	tao-
2.pl.fam.	o- -Vmu	o- -Vmu	ome- -Vmu	ome- -Vmu	omo- -Vmu	omo- -Vmu
2.pl.hon.	to- -Vmu	ta- -Vmu	te- -Vmu	tae- -Vmu	to- -Vmu	tao- -Vmu
3.pl.	do-	da-	de-	dae-	do-	dao-

For ae-class and ao-class verbs, mood is only distinguished by the use of the respective subject prefix:

de-basa 'we read' (realis) ~ dae-basa 'we will read' (irrealis)
no-lodo 'he sleeps' (realis) ~ nao-lodo 'he will sleep' (irrealis)

With a-class verbs, irrealis mood is additionally marked by the infix <um>:

no-horo 'it flies' (realis) ~ na-h<um>oro 'it will fly' (irrealis)

Intransitive verbs mostly employ a-class or ao-class prefixes. As a general rule, a-class verbs are dynamic intransitive verbs, while ao-class verbs are stative intransitive verbs. With a few exceptions, transitive verbs use ae-class prefixes with an indefinite object, but a-class prefixes with a definite object.

ne-ala-mo kapulu 'He took a machete' (indefinite, ae-class prefix)
no-ala-mo kapulu-no 'He took his machete' (definite, a-class prefix)

There are two sets of object suffixes, marking direct and indirect objects.

	direct	indirect
1.sg.	-kanau	-kanau
2.sg.fam.	-ko	-angko
2.sg.hon.	-kaeta	-kaeta
3.sg.	-e	-ane
1.du./pl.incl.	---	---
1.pl.excl.	-kasami	-kasami
2.pl.fam.	-koomu	-angkoomu
2.pl.hon.	-kaetaamu	-kaetaamu
3.pl.	-da	-anda

Combinations of two suffixes are restricted to indirect object suffixes + the third person singular direct object suffix -e:

a-ghumoli-angko-e 'I will buy it for you.'
