= Butonese people =

Ethnic group of Indonesia

Butonese people Orang Buton / Butuni / Butung / 부똥 / Wolio
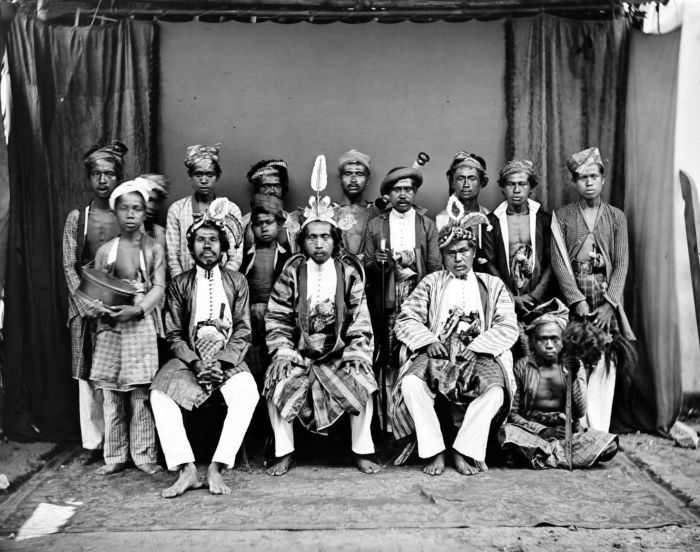
- Portrait of an embassy of Buton, Residency of Celebes and Dependencies, Dutch East Indies (present-day Indonesia), circa 1900.

Total population
- 233,000

Regions with significant populations
- Indonesia: Tukangbesi Islands, Southeast Sulawesi (215,000); Maluku (province); West Papua (province); Malaysia; Kota Kinabalu, Sandakan, Tawau (18,000)

Languages
- Muna–Buton languages (Cia-Cia language, Lasalimu language, Kumbewaha language), Wolio language, Indonesian language, Sabah Malay

Religion
- Islam (predominantly)

Related ethnic groups
- Bonerate people, Muna people

The Butonese (sometimes Butuni, Butung) people is a collective term that embraces a number of ethnic groups of Buton and neighbouring islands in Southeast Sulawesi. Like many other ethnic groups in Sulawesi, the Butonese are seafarers and traders. Butonese have long since migrated to many parts of the Malay archipelago using smaller vessels ranging from those that can only accommodate five people to large boats that can hold up to about 150 tons of goods. In general, the Butonese are a community that inhabits the region of the historical Buton Sultanate. When the swapraja (self-governance, created by the Dutch colonial government) domain was abolished, so did the Buton Sultanate which ended in 1951. The area of the former Sultanate is now distributed over several regencies and cities of Southeast Sulawesi. Among them are Baubau, Buton Regency, South Buton Regency, Central Buton Regency, North Buton Regency, Wakatobi Regency and Bombana Regency.

Occasionally, the Bajau people are mislabeled as Butonese people.

== Culture ==
Apart from being a community of seafarers, the Butonese people are also familiar with agriculture in earlier times. Commodities that are planted include paddy, corn, cassava, sweet potatoes, cotton, coconut, betel, pineapple, banana, and all other common needs of their everyday lives. Butonese people are well known for their culture and until today it can still be seen in regions of the Buton Sultanate. Such as the fortress of the Butonese palace which is the largest fortress in the world, the Malige Palace which is a traditional Butonese house that stands firmly as high as four stories without using a single nail, the currency of the Buton Sultanate called kampua or bida, and many more.

Most Butonese adhere to Islam. The Butonese adopted the religion around the mid-sixteenth century via Ternate influence.
