= Balaesang language =

Austronesian language spoken on Sulawesi, Indonesia

Balaesang
- Native to: Indonesia
- Region: Central Sulawesi
- Native speakers: (3,200 cited 2001)
- Language family: Austronesian: Malayo-Polynesian; Celebic; Tomini–Tolitoli ?; Tomini; Balaesang

Language codes
- ISO 639-3: bls
- Glottolog: bala1314
- ELP: Balaesang

Balaesang is a Celebic language of Sulawesi in Indonesia.

It is spoken in the three villages of Kamonji, Ketong, and Rano on Balaesang Peninsula, Sulawesi. Most people in Balaesang District, however, are ethnic Pendau.
