= Bonerate people =

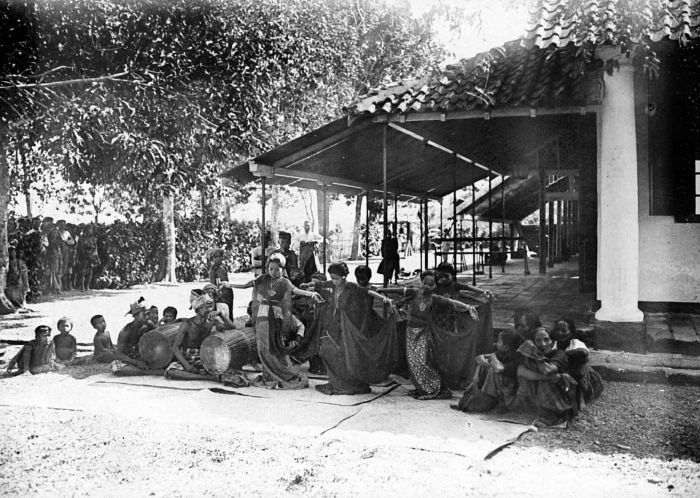
- Pakarena dancers from Selayar Regency, South Sulawesi, Indonesia.

Total population
- 13,900

Regions with significant populations
- Indonesia (South Sulawesi)

Languages
- Tukangbesi-Bonerate languages (Bonerate language), Indonesian language

Religion
- Islam

Related ethnic groups
- Butonese • Makassar • Selayar

The Bonerate people are an ethnic group in South Sulawesi, Indonesia. They inhabit around the Selayar island group such as Bonerate, Madu, Kalaotoa, and Karompa islands.

== Culture ==
The Bonerate people are generally Muslims. Some traditional beliefs are still extant among the Bonerate. Sexually provocative behaviour occurs in possession-trance ritual practiced by women only and were carried out in a way by which they smother glowing embers with their bare feet at the climax of the ritual. The Bonerate language is closely related to the language of the Tukang Besi islands off the southeast coast of Buton island.

Many Bonerate are agriculturists, utilizing the slash-and-burn technique. Common crops grown include corn, cassava, several fruits like papaya and bananas and some vegetables like beans and peas. Some Bonerate also work as shipbuilders and sailors.
