= Tajio language =

Austronesian language spoken on Sulawesi, Indonesia

Tajio
- Kasimbar
- Native to: Central Sulawesi, Indonesia
- Native speakers: 12,000 (2001)
- Language family: Austronesian: Malayo-Polynesian; Celebic; Tomini–Tolitoli ?; Tomini; Tajio

Language codes
- ISO 639-3: tdj
- Glottolog: taji1246
- ELP: Tajio

Tajio (Ajio), or Kasimbar, is a Celebic language of Sulawesi in Indonesia.

The Tajio-speaking area is located between Lauje and Ampibabo.
