= L.M. Idrus Effendi =

La Ode Idrus Effendi

Member of Muna legislative council
- In office 1 February 1951 – 30 April 1951

Personal details
- Born: April 15, 1925 Raha, Dutch East Indies
- Died: June 10, 1965 (aged 40)
- Party: Centre for the Candidacy Movement of La Ode M. Effendi
- Spouse: Wa Ode Anifa
- Children: Wa Ode Rusdiah Effendy; La Ode Ismet Neangka; Wa Ode Karniati Neangka; La Ode Aswar Neangka; Helda Effendy; Herida Effendy; La Ode Askar Neangka

Military service
- Allegiance: Indonesia
- Branch/service: Batalyon Sadar
- Years of service: 1945–1950
- Battles/wars: Indonesian National Revolution

La Ode Muhammad Idrus Effendi (15 April 1925 - 10 June 1965) was an Indonesian journalist, politician, and independence fighter from Muna.

== Early life and education ==
Effendi was born in Raha on 15 April 1925 to a Muna aristocratic family. His father's name was La Ode Ipa, while his mother's was Wa Mponiki. He studied at HIS and He Hanel School in Malang. He then enrolled at Academic of Journalism and University of Indonesia, majoring in psychology, in Jakarta.

== Career ==
=== Military career ===
The news of Proclamation of the Independence had just arrived in Muna at the end of August 1945. Responding to that news, Effendi initiated the establishment of a pro-Indonesia armed group in Muna by recruiting five members from each militia that existed in Muna, which were PETA, Heiho, PMI, and OPI. The armed group was formed on 27 August 1945 and named Organisasi Barisan 20 (Row 20 Organization). The group then held a meeting and appointed Effendi as the leader. As a leader of the organization, he used the pseudonym Siiti Goldaria to spread the pamphlets informing that TNI would soon land at Muna.

To gain support from the government, Effendi went to Surabaya by Bunga Melati boat on 5 September 1945. As he arrived at Port of Tanjung Perak, People's Security Army soldiers detained him and the rest of the passengers because the boat brought a Dutchman. Two weeks later, Effendi's colleague, Abdul Hamid Langkosono, accidentally spotted and released him immediately. He then received military training.

Effendi and Langkosono met high-rank Indonesian Navy officers at Lawang. The meeting resulted in the joining of Organisasi Barisan 20 to Division I Crew "X" Brigade D-81 Unit IX Group Surabaya. Moreover, he received orders from the Chief of Staff of the Navy, Hamzah Tuppu, to conduct infiltration and resistance against the KNIL soldiers in Muna.

In August 1946, Effendi left Surabaya for Raha. As he arrived in Raha, he then met the vice commandant of Organisasi Barisan 20, Taeda Ahmad, to convey Tuppu's message to launch resistance against the Dutch. From the meeting, they formed the Sadar Battalion on 12 May 1947 amidst the increasing number of its personnel. Afterwards, the battalion held a demonstration in Muna demanding the dissolution of State of East Indonesia.

Realizing that Batalyon had a shortage of weapons, Effendi and La Ditu went to Makassar to meet pro-Indonesia NIT MP Tadjuddin Noor for arms aid. Noor agreed and sent five Japanese carbines and ten hand grenades to the group. Afterward, he made a simultaneous attack plan on the Dutch soldiers in Muna, Kendari, Buton, and Kolaka on 25 October 1948 and sent couriers to Kendari and Kolaka to instruct Suppu Yusuf to launch the attack.

KNIL and the local police launched a night raid in Raha on 20 October 1948 and arrested 50 Batalyon Sadar members, including Effendi. He was then put in the Raha jail for three months and later transferred to Amoito Prison in Kendari. Following the transfer of sovereignty of Indonesia from the Dutch to the United States of Indonesia, he was released from prison on 27 December 1949.

=== Late career and death ===
Corn, L.M Idrus Effendi's election symbol

Batalyon Sadar was dissolved in 1950 through instruction from the Chief of Staff of the Indonesian Army, and Effendi was dismissed from the position. From 1 February 1951 to 30 April, he became the MP of the Muna Legislative Council. Afterward, he worked as editor-in-chief of Teknik Permobilan magazine.

In 1955, he ran for the 1955 election as the candidate of Constitutional Assembly for the Centre for the Candidacy Movement of La Ode M. Effendi along with A. Sjafruddin. Although the movement won 31,988 votes and gained one seat, Sjafruddin was elected as the group representative at the Konstituante instead of Effendi. Effendi then went to Makassar and became the editor-in-chief of Tanah Air newspaper from 1960 until his death on 10 June 1965.

== Personal life ==
Effendi married Wa Ode Anifa and had seven children.

== Legacy ==
People's Conscience Party faction of the Muna Legislative Council asked the Muna Regional Government to fight for Effendi to be awarded National Hero.

== Bibliographies ==
- Salebaran, Salebaran; M., Aswati (2018). "Perjuangan La Ode Muhammad Idrus Effendy dalam Mempertahankan Kemerdekaan Republik Indonesia di Muna : 1945-1949". Idea of History. 1 (2).
- Kumpulan Peraturan-Peraturan untuk Pemilihan Konstituante. Ministry of Information. 1956.
