= Dondo language =

Dondo language may refer to:

- Dondo language (Austronesian)
- Doondo language (Bantu)
