= Dampelas language =

Austronesian language spoken on Sulawesi, Indonesia

Dampelas
- Native to: Central Sulawesi, Indonesia
- Native speakers: 2,000 (2007)
- Language family: Austronesian: Malayo-Polynesian; Celebic; Tomini–Tolitoli ?; Tomini; Dampelas

Language codes
- ISO 639-3: dms
- Glottolog: damp1237
- ELP: Dampelas

Dampelas (Dampal) is a Celebic language of Sulawesi in Indonesia. It is the main language of Dampelas District (kecamatan).
