= Dondo language (Austronesian) =

Austronesian language spoken on Sulawesi, Indonesia

Dondo
- Native to: Central Sulawesi, Indonesia
- Native speakers: 13,000 (2001)
- Language family: Austronesian: Malayo-Polynesian; Celebic; Tomini–Tolitoli ?; Tomini; Dondo
- Dialects: Ampibabo

Language codes
- ISO 639-3: dok
- Glottolog: dond1249
- ELP: Dondo

Dondo is a Celebic language of Sulawesi in Indonesia. It is not clear how distinct it is from Tomini. It is spoken along the western coast of the "neck" of Sulawesi.
