= Kalao language =

Austronesian language spoken in Indonesia

Kalao
- Kalaotoa
- Native to: Indonesia
- Region: Sulawesi
- Native speakers: (500 cited 1989)
- Language family: Austronesian: Malayo-Polynesian; Celebic; Wotu–Wolio; Kalao–Laiyolo; Kalao

Language codes
- ISO 639-3: kly
- Glottolog: kala1394
- ELP: Kalao

Kalao, or Kalaotoa, is an Austronesian language of Kalao Island, South Sulawesi, Indonesia. It belongs to the Wotu–Wolio branch of the Celebic subgroup.
