= Totoli language =

Austronesian language spoken on Sulawesi, Indonesia

Totoli
- Native to: Parts of Central Sulawesi, Indonesia
- Native speakers: (25,000 cited 2001)
- Language family: Austronesian: Malayo-Polynesian (MP); Celebic (?); Tomini–Tolitoli (?); Tolitoli; Totoli

Language codes
- ISO 639-3: txe
- Glottolog: toto1304
- ELP: Totoli

Totoli (also known as Tolitoli) is a Sulawesi language of the Austronesian language family spoken by about 25,000 of the Totoli people of Central Sulawesi, Indonesia.

== Grammar ==
=== Voice ===
Totoli has a symmetrical voice system. In the examples below, i Winarno mongusut kunji motorna is an actor voice construction, while kunji itu kusuti i Winarno is an undergoer voice construction.

I Winaro moN-kusut kunji motor=na
HON PN AV-look.for key scooter=3S.GEN
'Winarno is looking for the keys of his scooter.'

kunji itu kusut-i i Winaro
key DIST look.for-UV.2 HON PN
'The keys are being looked for by Winarno.'

The syntactic pivot can be placed before the predicate, as shown:

gaukan no-gutu ponguman itu
king AV.RLS-make story DIST
'The king made this announcement.'

kopi ia ni-pogutu i Andris
coffee PRX RLS(UG)-make PN Andrew
'Andrew made this coffee.'
