= Taje language =

Austronesian language spoken on Sulawesi, Indonesia

Taje
- Petapa
- Native to: Indonesia (Central Sulawesi)
- Native speakers: 350 (2001)
- Language family: Austronesian: Malayo-Polynesian; Celebic; Tomini–Tolitoli ?; Tomini; Taje

Language codes
- ISO 639-3: pee
- Glottolog: taje1237
- ELP: Taje

Taje (Aje), or Petapa (Tapa), is a Celebic language of Sulawesi in Indonesia. Taje is a minority language with a small population of speakers, and is spoken in the Tanampedagi and Petapa villages in Central Sulawesi.
