= Hamzah Tuppu =

Indonesian Navy officer and journalist

- Born: 20 August 1920; Bontosunggu, Dutch East Indies
- Died: 30 June 1986 (aged 65)
- Children: 4
- Military career
- Allegiance: Indonesia
- Branch: Indonesian Navy
- Service years: 1945–?
- Rank: Colonel

A. Hamzah Tuppu (20 August 1920 – 30 June 1986), also written as Hamzah Daeng Tuppu, was a mid-ranking Indonesian Navy officer and journalist. He was a founder of the Indonesian Navy in Surabaya, East Java. He is considered as a pioneer in the creation of the Indonesian Navy.

== Early life and career ==
Tuppu was born in Borongcalla, Bontosunggu on 20 August 1920. His father's name was Sayyid Daeng Ngempo, and his mother was I Tallasa Daeng Rannu. He was the seventh-generation descendant of Yusuf Al-Makassari.

During his childhood, he was raised by Karaeng Galesong XVI, I Laringau Daeng Mangingruru and often called Cakkua. He also attended school in Makassar.

After finishing school, Tuppu worked at the Land Office in Makassar in 1938. He became involved in the anti-colonial movement against the Dutch in 1941. His involvement in the anti-colonial struggle led to his arrest and imprisonment in Sengkang and later in Garut. While detained in Garut, he befriended Sukarni and read books by Tan Malaka, including Naar de Republiek Indonesië. From there, he began to admire Tan Malaka. He received direct tutorials from him regarding revolutionary struggle and guerrilla warfare tactics. In 1942, he was released from prison.

== Military career ==
During the Japanese occupation, Tuppu joined Jawa Hokokai and the Navy of Defenders of the Homeland. He also received military training from the Imperial Japanese Navy.

After the proclamation of independence, Tuppu met Tan Malaka at Sukarni’s house on Minangkabau Street, Jakarta. In his meeting with Tan Malaka, he gained knowledge about guerrilla warfare tactics. Sukarni then asked Hamzah to go to Surabaya together with Sjamsu, Abidin Effendi, and Deibel Effendi for political action. They agreed to Sukarni’s request and went to Surabaya. Upon arriving in Surabaya, they formed the People's Security Army (BKR) Navy by recruiting sailors from Djawa Unko Kaisha, Akatsuki Butai, Heiho Navy, the maritime school, port laborers, and former members of the Royal Netherlands Navy.

As a naval leader, Tuppu was known as the person who designed the naval defense when NICA forces entered Java. To the youth forces from Raha, Barisan 20, he gave a mandate for them to establish Battalion Sadar. He also ordered L.M. Idrus Effendi, who also served as Commander of Battalion Sadar, to return to Raha and launch resistance against the Dutch. In 1947, Hamzah led the D-81 Brigade Crew.

== Post-military career and death ==
In the 1950s, Tuppu became the editor-in-chief of Maega magazine. In 1956, the Agency for the Accommodation of Former Armed Fighters proposed to the Ministry of Home Affairs to appoint him as Governor of Sulawesi.

Tuppu died on 30 June 1986 and was buried at the Kalibata Heroes Cemetery.

== Personal life ==
Hamzah married Erma Doomik in 1945, and the couple had four children.

== Awards ==
- Medal for Military Operation Service I (29 January 1958)
- Guerrilla Star (10 November 1959)
- Medal for Saptamarga (29 January 1959)
- Medal for Independence War I (5 October 1959)
- Medal for Independence War II (5 October 1959)
- Class A Veteran Charter (1964)
- Certificate of Appreciation as a Distinguished Figure from Takalar Regency Government (10 February 2000)

A monument was erected in South Galesong in 2002 to commemorate Tuppu's services. His name was also named after a street in Takalar.
