= Siompu =

- Location within Sulawesi

Geography
- Location: South East Asia
- Coordinates: 5°39′11″S 122°30′59″E
- Area: 53.20 km^{2} (20.54 sq mi)

Administration
- Indonesia
- Province: Southeast Sulawesi

Demographics
- Population: 23,651 (mid 2023 estimate)
- Pop. density: 444.6/km^{2} (1151.5/sq mi)

Siompu is an island in South Buton Regency, Southeast Sulawesi, Indonesia. This island is located southwest in Buton. It has a population of 16,872 at the 2010 Census and 21,571 at the 2020 Census.
