= Wotu–Wolio languages =

Subgroup of the Austronesian language family

Wotu–Wolio
- Southern Kaili–Wolio
- Geographic distribution: Sulawesi
- Linguistic classification: Austronesian: Malayo-Polynesian; Celebic; Wotu–Wolio

Language codes
- Glottolog: wotu1239
- Map of languages on the island of Sulawesi, Wotu-Wolio languages is colored in dark blue along with other Celebic languages.

The Wotu–Wolio languages are a group of closely related languages spoken in Sulawesi that belong to the Celebic subgroup of the Austronesian family.

== Classification ==
The Wotu–Wolio languages comprise five languages which are grouped into three branches:

- Kalao–Laiyolo, spoken on the Selayar Islands (South Sulawesi).
- Wolio–Kamaru, spoken on Buton Island (Southeast Sulawesi).
- Wotu, spoken in Wotu district (South Sulawesi) at the northern shore of the Bone Gulf.

While in earlier classifications, Wolio, Laiyolo, and later also Wotu, were included in the Muna–Buton subgroup, Donohue (2004) has shown that based on phonological evidence, the Wotu–Wolio languages form a distinct subgroup of their own.

Mead (2003) included the Wotu–Wolio languages as one out of six branches in the Celebic subgroup.

Zobel (2020) lists the Wotu–Wolio languages, which he calls Southern Kaili–Wolio, as Ledo, Wotu, Wolio, Kamaru, Kalao, and Loa' (Barang-Barang). Wolio, Kamaru, Kalao, and Loa' (Barang-Barang) make up the Island Kaili–Wolio subgroup within Southern Kaili–Wolio. Ledo has Kaili–Pamona morphological and grammatical features, while its lexicon is mainly of Wotu–Wolio origin. Mamuju is traditionally classified as South Sulawesi, but has a Wotu–Wolio lexical substratum.
