= BZL =

BZL or bzl may refer to:

- Barisal Airport (IATA: BZL), a domestic airport located in the southern city of Barisal in Bangladesh
- Boano language (Sulawesi) (ISO 639-3: bzl), a Sulawesi language of the Austronesian family
- Belanagar railway station (Station code: BZL), a railway station in West Bengal, India
- Kapelle-Biezelinge railway station (Station code: Bzl), a railway station in Kapelle, Netherlands
- Volvo BZL, a full-size zero-emission battery electric bus chassis manufactured by Volvo
