= Kamaru language =

Austronesian language

Kamaru
- Region: Sulawesi
- Native speakers: 3,500 (2004)
- Language family: Austronesian: Malayo-Polynesian; Celebic; Wotu–Wolio; Wolio–Kamaru; Kamaru

Language codes
- ISO 639-3: kgx
- Glottolog: kama1364

Kamaru is an Austronesian language spoken on Buton Island, Southeast Sulawesi, Indonesia. It belongs to the Wotu–Wolio branch of the Celebic subgroup.
