= Kaimbulawa language =

Language

Kaimbulawa
- Native to: Indonesia
- Region: Buton Island, Sulawesi
- Native speakers: 2,200 (2005)
- Language family: Austronesian: Malayo-Polynesian; Celebic; Muna–Buton; Munan; Munic; Kaimbulawa

Language codes
- ISO 639-3: zka
- Glottolog: kaim1241

Kaimbulawa is an Austronesian language spoken on the island of Siompu, southwest of Buton Island, which is off the southeast coast of Sulawesi in Indonesia. It belongs to the Muna–Buton branch of the Celebic subgroup.
