= Liabuku language =

Austronesian language

Liabuku
- Native to: Indonesia (Sulawesi)
- Region: Buton Island
- Native speakers: 75 (2004)
- Language family: Austronesian: Malayo-Polynesian; Celebic; Muna–Buton; Munan; Munic; Western; Liabuku

Language codes
- ISO 639-3: lix
- Glottolog: liab1237
- ELP: Liabuku

Liabuku is an Austronesian language of Buton Island, off the southeast coast of Sulawesi in Indonesia. Considered a dialect of Muna, it is more divergent than other Muna dialects.
