= Melanella deroeveri =

Scientific classification
- Kingdom: Animalia
- Phylum: Mollusca
- Class: Gastropoda
- Subclass: Caenogastropoda
- Order: Littorinimorpha
- Family: Eulimidae
- Genus: Melanella
- Species: †M. deroeveri

Binomial name
- †Melanella deroeveri Beets, 1942

Species of gastropod

Melanella deroeveri is an extinct species of sea snail, a marine gastropod mollusk in the family Eulimidae. The species is one of a number within the genus Melanella.

== Distribution ==
Fossils of this marine species were found in Oligocene strata at Buton, Indonesia.
