= Muna–Buton languages =

Subgroup of the Austronesian language family

Muna–Buton
- Geographic distribution: Southeast Sulawesi (Indonesia)
- Linguistic classification: Austronesian: Malayo-Polynesian; Celebic; Muna–Buton
- Proto-language: Proto-Muna-Buton
- Subdivisions: Nuclear Muna–Buton; Tukang Besi–Bonerate

Language codes
- Glottolog: muna1246
- Map of languages on the island of Sulawesi, Muna-Buton languages is colored in dark blue along with other Celebic languages.

The Muna–Buton languages are a group of languages spoken on the islands of Muna and Buton off the coast of South East Sulawesi province, Indonesia. They belong to the Celebic subgroup of the Austronesian family.

== Internal classification ==
The Ethnologue classifies the Muna–Buton languages as follows, based on van den Berg (2003) and Donohue (2004):

- Nuclear Muna–Buton
  - Buton
    - East Buton: Lasalimu, Kumbewaha
    - West Buton: Cia-Cia
  - Munan
    - Busoa
    - Munic
      - Kaimbulawa
      - Western Munic: Liabuku, Muna (Wuna), Pancana, Kioko
- Tukangbesi–Bonerate: Tukang Besi, Bonerate

In earlier classifications, Wolio, spoken in the city of Baubau (seat of the court of the former Sultanate of Buton) and its immediate surroundings, and Laiyolo, spoken in the southern part of Selayar Island, were also included in the Muna–Buton group, but Donohue (2004) has shown that they form a distinct subgroup of their own, Wotu–Wolio, which also includes Wotu, spoken at the northern shore of the Bone Gulf.

== Reconstruction ==
Proto-Muna–Buton
- Reconstruction of: Muna–Buton languages
- Reconstructed ancestors: Proto-Austronesian: Proto-Malayo-Polynesian; Proto-Celebic

Proto-Muna–Buton has been reconstructed by van den Berg (2003).

=== Phonology ===
Vowels
	Front	Central	Back
Close	*i		*u
Mid	*e		*o
Open		*a	

Consonants
			Labial	Alveolar	Palatal	Velar	Uvular	Glottal
Plosive	voiceless	plain	*p	*t		*k	*q	
Plosive	voiceless	prenasalized	*mp	*nt		*ŋk		
Plosive	voiced	plain/implosive	*ɓ	*ɗ		*g		
Plosive	voiced	prenasalized	*mb	*nd		*ŋg		
Fricative	voiceless	plain		*s				*h
Fricative	voiceless	prenasalized		*ns				
Fricative	voiced						*R	
Nasal			*m	*n		*ŋ		
Trill				*r				
Lateral				*l				
Approximant			*w		*y			

=== Vocabulary ===
Van den Berg proposes around 30 lexical innovations for Proto-Muna–Buton, e.g., *ɓeka 'cat', *kaɓi 'throw away', *kenta 'fish', *kompa 'eel', *potu 'head', *weŋke 'split open (fruit)', *woru 'under'.
