= Alvania waisiuensis =

Scientific classification
- Kingdom: Animalia
- Phylum: Mollusca
- Class: Gastropoda
- Subclass: Caenogastropoda
- Order: Littorinimorpha
- Superfamily: Rissooidea
- Family: Rissoidae
- Genus: Alvania
- Species: †A. waisiuensis

Binomial name
- †Alvania waisiuensis Beets, 1943

Synonyms
- †

Species of gastropod

Alvania waisiuensis is an extinct species of minute sea snail, a marine gastropod mollusc or micromollusk in the family Rissoidae.

== Distribution ==
Fossils of this species were found in Oligocene strata on the island Buton, Indonesia.
