= Boano language (Sulawesi) =

Austronesian language spoken on Sulawesi, Indonesia

Boano
- Bolano
- Native to: Indonesia (parts of Central Sulawesi)
- Native speakers: (2,700 cited 2001)
- Language family: Austronesian: Malayo-Polynesian (MP); Celebic; Tomini–Tolitoli ?; Tolitoli; Boano

Language codes
- ISO 639-3: bzl
- Glottolog: boan1243
- ELP: Boano (Sulawesi, Indonesia)
- Coordinates: 0.51°N 120.99°E

Boano (also called Bolano) is a Sulawesi language of the Austronesian family.

Boano is spoken in the single village of Bolano, Central Sulawesi, Indonesia. Boano speakers are surrounded by speakers of the Tialo language, who live along the coast between Tingkulang (Tomini) and Moutong.
