= Bonerate language =

Language

Bonerate
- Native to: Indonesia
- Region: Sulawesi, Taka Bonerate Islands
- Ethnicity: Bonerate people
- Native speakers: 10,000 (2010)
- Language family: Austronesian: Malayo-Polynesian; Celebic; Muna–Buton; Tukangbesi–Bonerate; Bonerate

Language codes
- ISO 639-3: bna
- Glottolog: bone1254
- ELP: Bonerate

Bonerate is an Austronesian language spoken in the Taka Bonerate Islands off South Sulawesi, Indonesia.
