= Johannes Cornelis Anceaux =

Dutch linguist

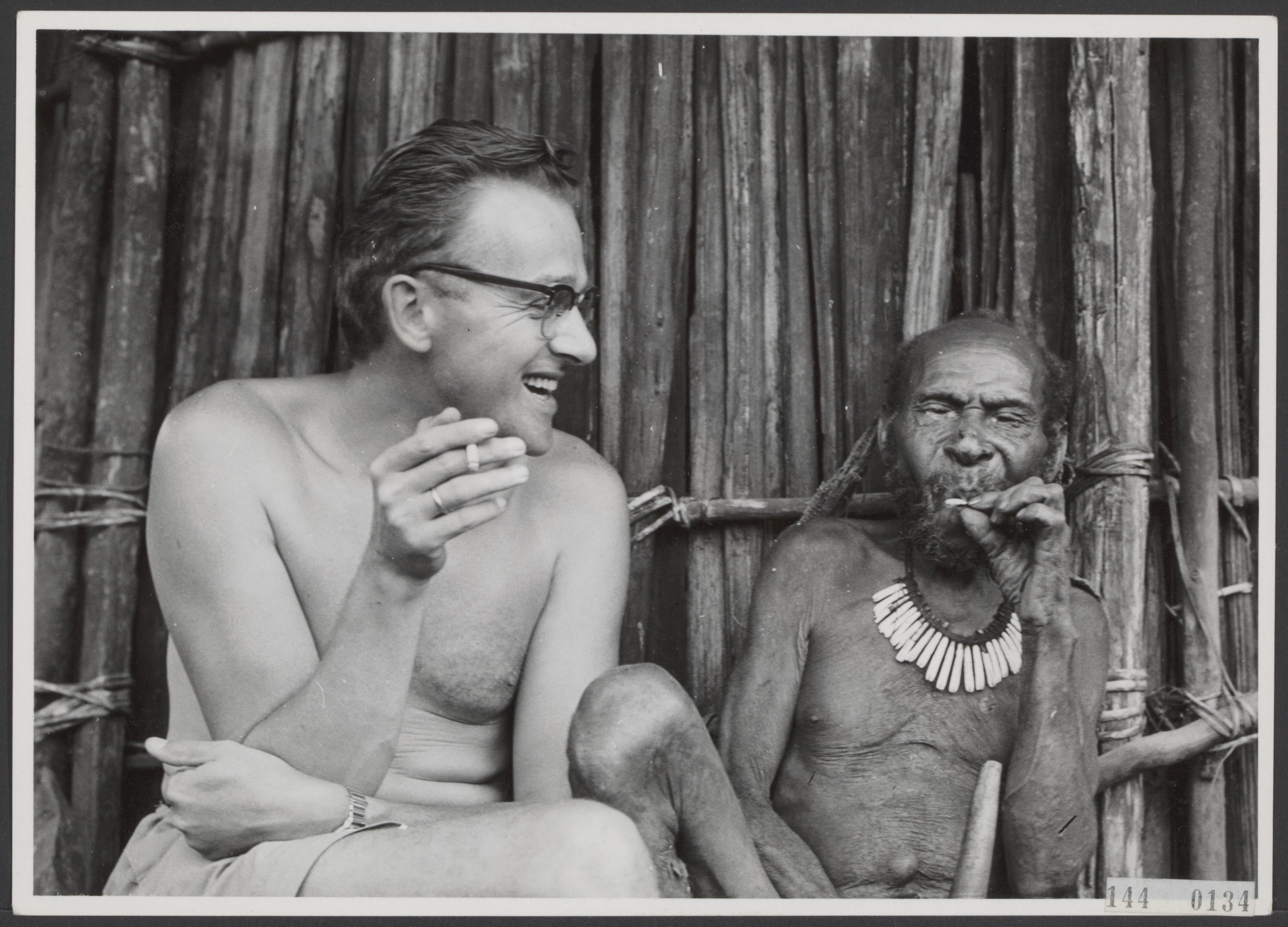
- Anceaux in New Guinea (1959)
- Born: 4 July 1920; Schiedam, Netherlands
- Died: 6 August 1988 (aged 68); Leiderdorp, Netherlands
- Spouse: Maria Rosinga
- Children: 4

Academic background
- Education: Leiden University and the University of Amsterdam
- Alma mater: Leiden University
- Thesis: Over de geschiedenis van de Indonesische taalkunde (1952)
- Doctoral advisor: Cornelis Christiaan Berg

Academic work
- Discipline: Linguistics; Anthropology
- Sub-discipline: Papuan and Austronesian linguistics

Johannes Cornelis Anceaux (4 July 1920 in Schiedam, Netherlands – 6 August 1988 in Leiderdorp, Netherlands) was a Dutch linguist and anthropologist known for his extensive work on Papuan and Austronesian languages.

Apart from his monographs on Wolio, Nimboran, and the languages of Yapen Island, Anceaux was also known for his wordlists of languages of Irian Jaya.

== Education ==
In 1938, Anceaux began studying Indonesian literature at Leiden University. However, the outbreak of World War II interrupted his studies as he was drafted into the military. After Leiden University closed in 1940, he went to the University of Amsterdam, where he passed his examination in 1942. After the war ended, under the supervision of Cornelis Christiaan Berg (1900–1990), he returned to Leiden University to complete his doctoral thesis Over de geschiedenis van de Indonesische taalkunde in 1952, with a particular emphasis on the Wolio language of Southeast Sulawesi.

== Family ==
In 1948, Anceaux married Maria Rosinga. The couple had two daughters and two son.

== Selected bibliography ==
- Anceaux, Johannes Cornelis. 1958. Languages of the Bomberai Peninsula: Outline of a linguistic map. Nieuw-Guinea Studiën 2: 109–121.
- Anceaux, Johannes C. 1961. The linguistic situation in the islands of Yapen, Kurudu, Nau and Miosnum. (Verhandelingen ven het Koninklijk Instituut voor Taal-, Land- en Volkenkunde 35.) The Hague: Martinus Nijhoff.
- Anceaux, Johannes C. 1965. The Nimboran language. (Verhandelingen ven het Koninklijk Instituut voor Taal-, Land- en Volkenkunde 44.) The Hague: Martinus Nijhoff.
- Smits, Leo and Clemens L. Voorhoeve. (eds.) 1994. The J. C. Anceaux Collection of Wordlists of Irian Jaya Languages B: Non-Austronesian (Papuan) Languages. Part I. Irian Jaya Source Material 9 Series B 3. Leiden-Jakarta: DSALCUL/IRIS.
- Smits, Leo and Clemens L. Voorhoeve. 1998. The J. C. Anceaux Collection of Wordlists of Irian Jaya Languages B: Non-Austronesian (Papuan) Languages. Part II. Irian Jaya Source Material 10 Series B 4. Leiden-Jakarta: DSALCUL/IRIS.
