= Lasalimu language =

Language

Lasalimu
- Region: Buton Island, Sulawesi
- Native speakers: (1,700 cited 1999)
- Language family: Austronesian: Malayo-Polynesian; Celebic; Muna–Buton; Buton; Lasalimu

Language codes
- ISO 639-3: llm
- Glottolog: lasa1237

Lasalimu is an Austronesian language spoken on Buton Island off the southeast coast of Sulawesi in Indonesia. It belongs to the Muna–Buton branch of the Celebic subgroup.
