= Kumbewaha language =

Austronesian language spoken in Indonesia

Kumbewaha
- Region: Buton Island, Sulawesi, Indonesia
- Native speakers: 3,400 (2004)
- Language family: Austronesian: Malayo-Polynesian; Celebic; Muna–Buton; Buton; Kumbewaha

Language codes
- ISO 639-3: xks
- Glottolog: kumb1274
- ELP: Kumbewaha

Kumbewaha (Umbewaha) is an Austronesian language spoken on Buton Island off the southeast coast of Sulawesi in Indonesia.
