= Busoa language =

Austronesian language spoken in Indonesia

Busoa
- Native to: Sulawesi, Indonesia
- Region: Buton Island
- Native speakers: (2,300 cited 2000)
- Language family: Austronesian: Malayo-Polynesian; Celebic; Muna–Buton; Munan; Busoa

Language codes
- ISO 639-3: bup
- Glottolog: buso1238
- ELP: Busoa

Busoa is an Austronesian language spoken in the villages of Busoa and Lakambau in South Buton Regency on Buton Island, off the southeast coast of Sulawesi in Indonesia.
