= Hunminjeongeum Society =

South Korean pro-Hangul organization

- Hangul: 훈민정음학회
- Hanja: 訓民正音學會
- RR: Hunminjeongeum hakhoe
- MR: Hunminjŏngŭm hakhoe

The Hunminjeongeum Society (Korean: 훈민정음학회), sometimes called the "Hunminjeongeum Research Institute" in English-language newspapers, is a private organization in Seoul dedicated to the propagation of Hangul to all the unwritten languages of the world. (Hunminjeongeum was the original name of hangul.) The society was founded by Lee Ki-nam, a retired real-estate agent, in 2007, after she had failed to bring hangul to the Tungusic Oroqen of Heilongjiang, China; the Tibeto-Burman Chepang of Nepal; and the Tibeto-Burman Lahu of Chiang Mai, Thailand; she attributed these failures to a reliance on Korean Christian missionaries in those countries, whose primary focus was not linguistics or literacy.

As of 2015, the society is chaired by linguistics professor Kim Ju-won of Seoul National University, and its current focus is on countries that send large numbers of people to work in Korea. In 2009 it succeeded in getting the city of Baubau, on Buton Island in Southeast Sulawesi, Indonesia, to adopt hangul for the Austronesian Cia-Cia language. The society has published a series of hangul Cia-Cia textbooks for use in schools, using an orthography designed by Kim, but in 2012 it was reported that adoption had been abandoned.

== See also ==
- Hangul
