= Pendau language =

Austronesian language spoken on Sulawesi, Indonesia

Pendau
- Umalasa (Note: In addition to these variants, "Kasimbar" and "Umalasa" are eponyms and exonym used to refer to Pendau. "Kasimbar" comes from an important trading town in the language area, according to Quick. Ethnologue lists "Umalasa" as an slur used by the Buginese. "Umalasa" translates as "the sick ones.")
- Native to: Indonesia
- Region: Central Sulawesi
- Ethnicity: Pendau
- Native speakers: 3940 (2007)
- Language family: Austronesian: Malayo-Polynesian; Celebic; Tomini–Tolitoli ?; Tomini; Southern Tomini; Pendau
- Writing system: Latin

Language codes
- ISO 639-3: ums
- Glottolog: pend1242
- ELP: Pendau

Pendau (Ndaoe, Ndau), or Umalasa, is a Celebic language of Sulawesi in Indonesia spoken by the approximately 4000 Pendau people who live in Central Sulawesi. Classified as an endangered language, Pendau is primarily spoken inside of Pendau villages whereas Indonesian is used to speak with neighboring communities and is the language of children's education and outside officials. The highest concentration of speakers is in and around Kecamatan Balaesang. There are no known dialects within the Pendau region, although speakers from the mainland can identify whether a speaker is from the Balaesang peninsula through their 'rhythm' or intonation pattern. In recent years, some Pendau leaders have worked with local government to preserve their language alongside Indonesian.

== History ==
While the history of the Pendau has only been recently documented, a history has been pulled together through folklore and oral traditional, historical documents kept by European explorers, Pendau language developments, and the present situation of the Pendau. In contrast to neighboring groups, older Pendau men hold that the Pendau have never had a king and view themselves as having no class distinctions, although hierarchical roles did exist in decision-making and conflict resolution. The earliest document about the Pendau comes from 1795, when an American crew led by Captain David Woodward was found stranded off the west coast of Sulawesi. Between 1925-1935, Dutch-trained Indonesian evangelists began to arrive, and many of the Pendau today are registered as Christians by the government and practice Christianity (although many features of animism are still practiced). During World War II, the Japanese occupied Indonesia. Some Pendau still recite Japanese phrases and songs, although there are mixed opinions about the occupation with the occupation described as a difficult time by many who remember it. In recent history, many Pendau have made their living in metalsmithing, agriculture, hunting, fishing, and sago making.

== Geographic distribution ==
The Pendau often live in small, often isolated communities in Donggala between Balaesang and Dampal Utara. The Balaesang Peninsula forms its own mountain range that runs north and south, splitting the east and west coast. Most of the Pendau happen to live along the west coast. The Sirenja sub-district is considered the southernmost boundary of the Pendau-speaking area.

== Phonology ==
=== Vowels ===
Pendau has five vowel phonemes: two front vowels, /i/ and /e/, one central vowel /a/, and two back vowels, /ɯ/ (orthographic ⟨u⟩) and /o/. Most vowels are unrounded and /o/ is the only rounded vowel in Pendau. Pendau has no diphthongs.

	Front	Central	Back
High	i		ɯ ⟨u⟩
Mid	e		o
Low		a	

==== W-glide formation ====
The high back unrounded vowel (/u/) changes to a labial-velar glide (/w/) when it comes before a syllable with no consonant in the onset position. When this happens, the labial-velar glide takes the place of the onset consonant, reducing the number of would-be syllables.

Examples of w-glide formation
Vowel to Consonant Change and Syllable reduction	Phonetic transcription	English translation
u.a.ni → wa.ni	[wan̪i]	'honey bee'
ta.u.a.san → ta.wa.san	[t̪aws̪an]	'unicorn fish'

=== Consonants ===
Pendau has 19 consonant phonemes, although ⟨w⟩ (which is not an underlying phoneme) appears in its written orthography. There are five contrastive places of articulation and six contrastive manners of articulation. There are two affricates in Pendau, the voiceless dental sibilant affricate (/t̪ʃ/) and the voiced alveolar sibilant affricate (/dʒ/).

	Labial	Dental-Alveolar	Alveo-Palatal	Velar	Glottal
Nasal	m	n̪ ⟨n⟩	ɲ ⟨ny⟩	ŋ ⟨ng⟩	
Plosive	p	t̪ ⟨t⟩	t̪ʃ ⟨c⟩	k	ʔ ⟨'⟩
Plosive	b	d	dʒ ⟨j⟩	ɡ	
Fricative	β ⟨v⟩	s̪ ⟨s⟩			h
Liquid		ɭ ⟨l⟩			
Trill		r̪ ⟨r⟩			
Semivowel	(w)			j ⟨y⟩	

==== Allophones ====
In word-final positions, voiceless plosives are pronounced as unreleased allophones: e.g. the [p] in [api] becomes a [p̚] in [aɭap̚]. Other allophones in Pendau include the voiced dental nasal [n̪] becoming the syllabic dental [n̩] and the voiced velar nasal [ŋ] becoming the syllabic velar nasal [ŋ̍] before a homorganic obstruent such as in [n̩dau] and in [ŋ̍ka:t̪̚].

Examples of Allophones
/p/ and /p̚/
api	[api]	'fire'
alap	[aɭap̚]	'take'
/t̪/ and /t̪̚/
tinting	[t̪int̪iŋ]	'time'
udut	[udut̪̚]	'server'
/k/ and /k̚/
kareva	[kareβa]	'news'
tanduk	[t̪anduk̚]	'horn'
/n̪/ and /n̩/
nabo	[n̪aboʔ]	'roof'
ndau	[n̩dau]	'no'
/ŋ/ and /ŋ̍/
nyaa	[ŋa:]	'don't'
ngkaat	[ŋ̍ka:t̪̚]	'small flame'

==== Creaky voice ====
The glottal stop (/ʔ/) is sometimes realized as creaky voice. It has been observed that "in place of a true stop, a very compressed form of creaky voice or some less extreme form of stiff phonation may be superimposed on the vocalic stream." The creaky voice manifests on one or more of the contiguous vowels where the glottal stop would have been. For example, creaky voice is written with [V̰] in [riV̰uo], where creaky voice appears between [i] and [o] as one vowel transitions into the next vowel.

Examples of Creaky Voice
ri'uo	[riV̰uo]	'in/by/at there'
so'uya	[s̪oV̰uja]	'why'

=== Syllable structure ===
The syllabic template in Pendau is (C)V(C). Pendau is one of the few Sulawesi languages with a full system of final consonants (e.g. the neighboring Kaili languages only allow CV and V, while demonstrated syllable patterns in Pendau include VC and CVC).

Template	Instantiation	Translation
V	n.da.u	'no'
CV	wa.ni	'honeybee'
VC	to.nang.la.it	'the crippled one'
CVC	wa.lan.da.no	'Walandano (village)'

In the above example, /n/ in ndau behaves as a syllabic consonant.

Consonant distribution in the syllable
	p	t	c	k	b	d	j	g	m	n	ny	ng	v	s	h	'	l	r	y
Onset	X	X	X	X	X	X	X	X	X	X	X	X	X	X	+	X	X	X	X
Coda	X	X	-	X	X	X	-	X	X	X	-	X	-	X	-	X	X	X	X

In the table above, X means that the consonant can occupy the respective position in the syllable and + means that it is a marginal phoneme. In Pendau, /h/ is the sole marginal phoneme, and it is hypothesized to be borrowed from Indonesian loan words.

=== Stress ===
Stress always falls on the penultimate syllable and is unmarked. Words in Pendau require at least two syllables, which reflects this stress pattern. Some have described this process as "pitch accent" because the change in stress is accompanied by a change in pitch (as measured in Hz). However, Phil Quick, author of A Grammar of the Pendau Language, states that "the use of 'pitch accent' should not be confused with languages such as Japanese in which 'pitch accent' is a term used to indicate a lexical contrast similar to tone language ... So technically then there are two types of pitch-accent languages, those such as Japanese where pitch-accent is phonemic, and those such as Pendau where pitch-accent is non-phonemic."

== Morphology ==
Pendau uses affixation (including prefixes, infixes, and suffixes) and has seven verb classes which are categorized as transitive, intransitive, or mixed transitivity. Pendau shows extensive use of clitics, reduplication, and limited subject agreement.

=== Affixation ===
Examples of Affixation
Prefixation
mong-	mongkumung	'carry'
Infixation
-um-	molumolon	'swim'
Suffixation
-a'	niolla'	'brought for someone'

=== Verb classes ===
Below is a table that lists all the verb classes in Pendau. All canonical verbs (besides stative verbs) require that the verb is prefixed with either the irrealis or realis mood. The subscripts A and P refers to whether the subject is the agent or patient.

Overview of Pendau verb classes
Transitivity	Verb Classes	Examples	Stem former (prefix)	Pivot / subject	Irrealis / realis (prefix)	Inverse (non-derived)
TRANSITIVE	Primary	nongkomung 'to carry'	pong-(pepe-)	A	M- / N-	ni'omung
TRANSITIVE	Factive	nogabu 'to cook'	po-	A	M- / N-	nipogabu
MIXED TRANSITIVITY	Dynamic	nelolo 'to search'	pe-	A~S_{A}	M- / N-	nilolo
MIXED TRANSITIVITY	Denominal	nojala 'to net'	po-	A~S_{A}	M- / N-	nijala
MIXED TRANSITIVITY	Locomotion	nol[um]olon 'to swim'	po-	A~S_{A}	M- / N-	--
INTRANSITIVE	Postural	nopotundo 'to sit'	popo-	S_{A}		--
INTRANSITIVE	Stative	notou 'to be finished'	--	S_{P}	mo-no-	--

=== Clitics ===
Pendau uses clitics show possession (genitive case), completion, continuation, relative clauses, and location. Clitics are phonologically part of the word (e.g., a word with a clitic adheres to the stress patterns as if the whole unit were one word), but syntactically functions as their own grammatical word.

List of clitics
='u	first personal singular (genitive)
=to	first person plural inclusive (genitive)
=mu	second person singular (genitive)
=nyo	third person singular (genitive)
=mo	completive aspect
=po	continuative
si=	proper noun marker (absolute)
ni=	poroper noun marker (genitive)
nu=	common noun marker (genitive)
to=	relative clause marker
ri=	general locative oblique

=== Reduplication ===
Reduplication in Pendau is classified as either affixation or compounding. Both full and partial reduplication are present in Pendau. Partial reduplication sometimes works in tandem with prefixation, as the prefix itself may be added and reduplicated instead of the reduplicating the base (see seseleo below). Reduplication is used for showing grammatical number, nominalization, and emphasis.

Examples of reduplication
Grammatical Number
unga	'child'	unga-unga	'children'
odo	'monkey'	odo-odo	'monkeys'
sapa	'what'	sapa-sapa	'whatever'
Nominalization
tinjo'	'plant w/ stick'	titinjo'	'planting stick, post, pole'
pangki	'hit, pound'	papangki	'sago pounder'
Emphasis
eleo	'day'	seseleo	'every day'
souya	'how many?'	sosouya	'several'

=== Agreement ===
Subject agreement only occurs with two abilitative verbs (i.e., verbs that show the ability of doing the action): ma'ule 'able' and matua 'capable.' These verbs themselves are prefixed with either the irrealis or realis mood.

Irrealis	Realis	
matua	natua	'able'
ma'ule	na'ule	'capable'

The examples below show matua with first person subject agreement.

A’u matua'u mengkani bau
1SG/ABS capable/IRR=1SG/GEN IRR-AUG/DYN-eat fish
'I am capable of eating fish'

== Syntax ==
=== Basic word order ===
The basic word order in Pendau is SVO or VOS, with the former being more common. Verbal prefixes show what the semantic role is of the argument in the subject position (agent or patient).

Siama’u nonuju siina’u
PR/ABS=Father=1SG/GEN REAL-AUG/TR=send PR/ABS=mother=1SG/GEN
'MY FATHER sent my mother'

Siama’u nituju niina’u
PR/ABS=Father=1SG/GEN INV/REAL-send PR/GEN=mother=1SG/GEN
'My mother sent MY FATHER'

==== Inverse voice ====
The inverse voice (VOS) can only be used with transitive verbs, and all transitive verbs can be inflected for the inverse voice. Intransitive verbs need to become transitive verbs through derivation before they can be in the inverse voice. Otherwise, the word order in Pendau (and the word order for all intransitive sentences) is SVO.

=== Prepositions ===
Pendau is a prepositional language. There are three prepositions: ila (ablative noun marker), ri= (locative noun phrase marker), and sono (comitative noun phrase marker). Preposed markers can be both independent words and proclitics.

Preposition (ila) functioning as an independent word

Ila junjung
ABL house
'From the house'

Preposition (ri=) functioning as a proclitic

Nenburamo panganganta uo sono riLatoadu
REAL-AUG-speak=COMPL flesh-eater yonder COM LOC=Latoadu
'The flesh-eater spoke to Latoadu'
