= Totoli people =

Ethnic group in Indonesia

Totoli
To Toli

Total population
- 25,000

Regions with significant populations
- Indonesia (Central Sulawesi)

Languages
- Totoli, Gorontalo Malay, and Indonesian

Religion
- Sunni Islam

Related ethnic groups
- Buol • Lauje • Dondo

The Totoli people (Totoli: To Toli; Indonesian: Orang Totoli), also known as Tolitoli, are an Austronesian ethnic group living along the northern coast of Central Sulawesi, specifically in the coastal region stretching from Sojol in the Donggala Regency in the south to Lakuan and Binontoan, Tolitoli Regency in the north.

The Totoli people generally speak the Totoli language and Indonesian. The use of the Totoli language is increasingly threatened today, as it is rarely heard in wider forms of communication, such as in markets, offices, or mosques.

== Etymology ==
The name To Toli or Tolitoli means 'three people'. According to Totoli elders, they believe their ancestors originated from three individuals:

1. Tau dei olisan bulaan (people from the yellow bamboo), also known as tau dei baolan
2. Tau dei pun lanjat (people from the langsat tree), also known as tau dei karamat binontoan
3. Tau dei ue taka (people from the saka rattan)

== Culture ==
=== Traditional clothing ===
The Totoli people have a form of traditional clothing made from the bark of the ivo tree and the nunu tree.

Traditional women's attire consists of a badu, a short-sleeved blouse with small folds decorated with beads and gold ribbons. The badu is paired with a lower garment called puyuka, long trousers decorated with gold ribbons and beads, a yellow waist belt, and a lipa or knee-length sarong.

Traditional men's attire usually consists of a long-sleeved blouse with a stand-up collar, decorated with gold ribbons and yellow beads, paired with puyuka. A knee-length sarong and a head covering called sanggo are also worn. Some ornaments used in customary ceremonies include palm leaves and bark.

=== Supernatural center ===
In the belief system of the Totoli people, the region of Tando Kanau is thought to possess supernatural powers. It is believed to be the center of mystical forces originating from Mount Tatanggalo, and also the meeting point of the spirit world of the three ancestral figures of the Totoli people.
