= Tomini–Tolitoli languages =

Subgroup of the Austronesian language family

Tomini–Tolitoli
- (proposed)
- Geographic distribution: Sulawesi, Indonesia
- Linguistic classification: Austronesian: Malayo-Polynesian; Celebic; Tomini–Tolitoli
- Subdivisions: Tolitoli; Tomini

Language codes
- Glottolog: tomi1242 Tominic toli1244 Tolitoli

The Tomini–Tolitoli languages are a disputed subgroup in the Austronesian language family spoken off the Gulf of Tomini and the regency of Tolitoli in northern Central Sulawesi province, Indonesia, consisting of two branches, viz. "Tomini" and "Tolitoli". The unity of this group has not yet been demonstrated, and it may well be that the two branches actually are not closer to each other than to other languages of Sulawesi.

== Languages ==
The following tentative classification of the Tomini–Tolitoli languages is from Himmelmann (2001:20).

- Tolitoli
  - Totoli
  - Boano
- Tomini
  - Northern Tomini
    - Ampibabo
    - Lauje
    - Tialo (Tomini)
    - Dondo
  - Southern Tomini
    - Balaesang
    - Pendau
    - Dampelas
    - Taje (Petapa)
    - Tajio

Totoli and Boano are closely related to each other but diverge very much from the other languages in terms of lexicon, phonology, and other areas. These two languages may have been influenced by the Gorontalic languages and also more recently by South Sulawesi languages such as Bugis and Makassar (Himmelmann 2001:20). Mead (2003) notes that certain aspects of the phonological history of Totoli and Boano even point against an inclusion of these two languages in the Celebic subgroup.

== Demographics ==
The demographics below are from Himmelmann (2001:18).

West Coast

- Balaesang: 3,200
- Pendau (Ndau): 3,200
- Dampelas (Dampal): 10,300
- Dondo: 13,000
- Totoli (Tolitoli): 25,000

East Coast

- Taje (Petapa): 350
- Ampibabo-Lauje: 6,000
- Tajio (Kasimbar): 12,000
- Lauje (Tinombo): 38,000
- Tialo (Tomini): 30,000
- Boano (Bolano): 2,700

Total
145,000
