= Laiyolo language =

Celebic language spoken in Indonesia

Laiyolo
- Loa’
- Native to: Indonesia
- Region: Sulawesi
- Ethnicity: Selayar people
- Native speakers: (800 cited 1997)
- Language family: Austronesian: Malayo-Polynesian; Celebic; Wotu–Wolio; Kalao–Laiyolo; Laiyolo
- Dialects: Laiyolo; Lowa; Barang-Barang

Language codes
- ISO 639-3: lji
- Glottolog: laiy1246
- ELP: Laiyolo

Laiyolo (Layolo) or Loa’ is an Austronesian language of South Sulawesi, Indonesia. This language is spoken on the southern tip of Selayar Island by the Selayar people and belongs to the Wotu–Wolio branch of the Celebic subgroup.

Barang-Barang and Lowa is a variety of Laiyolo.
