= Lauje language =

Celebic language of Sulawesi in Indonesia

Lauje
- Native to: Central Sulawesi, Indonesia
- Native speakers: (44,000 cited 2001)
- Language family: Austronesian: Malayo-Polynesian; Celebic; Tomini–Tolitoli ?; Tomini; Lauje
- Dialects: Ampibabo

Language codes
- ISO 639-3: law
- Glottolog: lauj1238
- ELP: Lauje
- Ampibabo

Lauje is a Celebic language of Sulawesi in Indonesia. Ampibabo, spoken in Ampibabo District, may be a separate language.
