= Tomini language =

Austronesian language spoken on Sulawesi, Indonesia

Tomini
- Tialo
- Native to: Central Sulawesi, Indonesia
- Native speakers: 30,000 (2001)
- Language family: Austronesian: Malayo-Polynesian; Celebic; Tomini–Tolitoli; Tomini; Tomini

Language codes
- ISO 639-3: txm
- Glottolog: tomi1243
- ELP: Tomini

Tomini proper, or Tialo, is an Austronesian language of the Celebic branch spoken in Central Sulawesi, Indonesia. Tialo speakers live along the coast of the Tomini Bay between Tingkulang (Tomini) and Moutong.
