= Wotu language =

Austronesian language spoken in Sulawesi, Indonesia

Wotu
- Native to: Indonesia
- Region: Sulawesi
- Ethnicity: 4,000 (2009)
- Native speakers: 500 (2009)
- Language family: Austronesian: Malayo-Polynesian; Celebic; Wotu–Wolio; Wotu

Language codes
- ISO 639-3: wtw
- Glottolog: wotu1240
- ELP: Wotu

Wotu is an endangered Austronesian language of South Sulawesi, Indonesia. It belongs to the Wotu–Wolio branch of the Celebic subgroup.
