= Tukang Besi language =

Austronesian language of the Tukangbesi Islands of southeast Sulawesi, Indonesia

Tukang Besi
- Native to: Indonesia
- Region: Sulawesi, Tukang Besi Archipelago
- Native speakers: (250,000 cited 1995)
- Language family: Austronesian: Malayo-Polynesian; Celebic; Muna–Buton; Tukang Besi

Language codes
- ISO 639-3: Either: khc – Tukang Besi North bhq – Tukang Besi South
- Glottolog: tuka1247

Tukang Besi, or known in Indonesia by the terms Pulo or Wakatobi, is an Austronesian language spoken in the Tukangbesi Islands in southeast Sulawesi in Indonesia by a quarter million speakers. A Tukang Besi pidgin is used in the area.

Tukang Besi Pidgin
- Native speakers: None
- Language family: Tukang Besi–based pidgin

Language codes
- ISO 639-3: –
- Glottolog: pidg1257

== Phonology ==
The northern dialect of Tukang Besi has 25 consonant phonemes and a basic 5-vowel system. It features stress which is usually on the second-to-last syllable. The language has two implosive consonants, which are uncommon in the world's languages. The plosives, except /ʔ/, and /s/ have prenasalized counterparts which act as separate phonemes.

Tukang Besi (northern dialect) consonants
		Bilabial		Dental/ Alveolar		Velar		Glottal
Nasal		m		n		ŋ		
Plosive	plain	p	b	t̪	(d̪)	k	ɡ	ʔ
Plosive	prenasalized	mp	mb	n̪t̪	n̪d̪	ŋk	ŋɡ	
Implosive			ɓ		ɗ̪			
Fricative	plain		β	s	(z)			h
Fricative	prenasalized			n̪s̪				
Trill				r				
Lateral				l̪				

The vowel phonemes of Tukang Besi

Notes:

- /b/ only appears in loanwords, but it contrasts with /ɓ/
- [d] and [z] are not phonemic and appear only as allophones of /dʒ/, which appears only in loanwords.

== Orthography ==
=== Vowels ===
- a – [a/ɐ]
- e – [ɛ/e]
- i – [i/ɪ]
- o – [o/ɔ]
- u – [ɯ/u]

=== Consonants ===
- b – [ɓ/ʔɓ/ʔb/β]
- b̠ – [b]
- c – [t͡ʃ]
- d – [ɗ̪]
- d̠ – [d/d͡ʒ/z]
- g – [g/ɠ/ʔɠ/ɣ]
- h – [h/ɸ]
- j – [d͡ʒ]
- k – [k/c]
- l – [l̪]
- m – [m]
- mb – [mb]
- mp – [mp]
- n – [n]
- nd – [n̪d̪]
- ns – [n̪s̪]
- nt – [n̪t̪]
- ng – [ŋ]
- ngg – [ŋɡ]
- ngk – [ŋk]
- nj – [n̪d̪]
- p – [p]
- r – [r]
- s – [s]
- t – [t̪]
- w – [w]
- ' – [ʔ]

== Grammar ==
=== Nouns ===
Tukang Besi does not have grammatical gender or number. It is an ergative–absolutive language.

=== Verbs ===
Tukang Besi has an inflectional future tense, which is indicated with a prefix, but no past tense.

=== Word order ===
Tukang Besi uses verb–object–subject word order, which is also used by Fijian. Like many Austronesian languages, it has prepositions, but places adjectives, genitives, and determiners after nouns. Yes–no questions are indicated by a particle at the end of the sentence.
