= Raha, Muna =

Raha
- Town
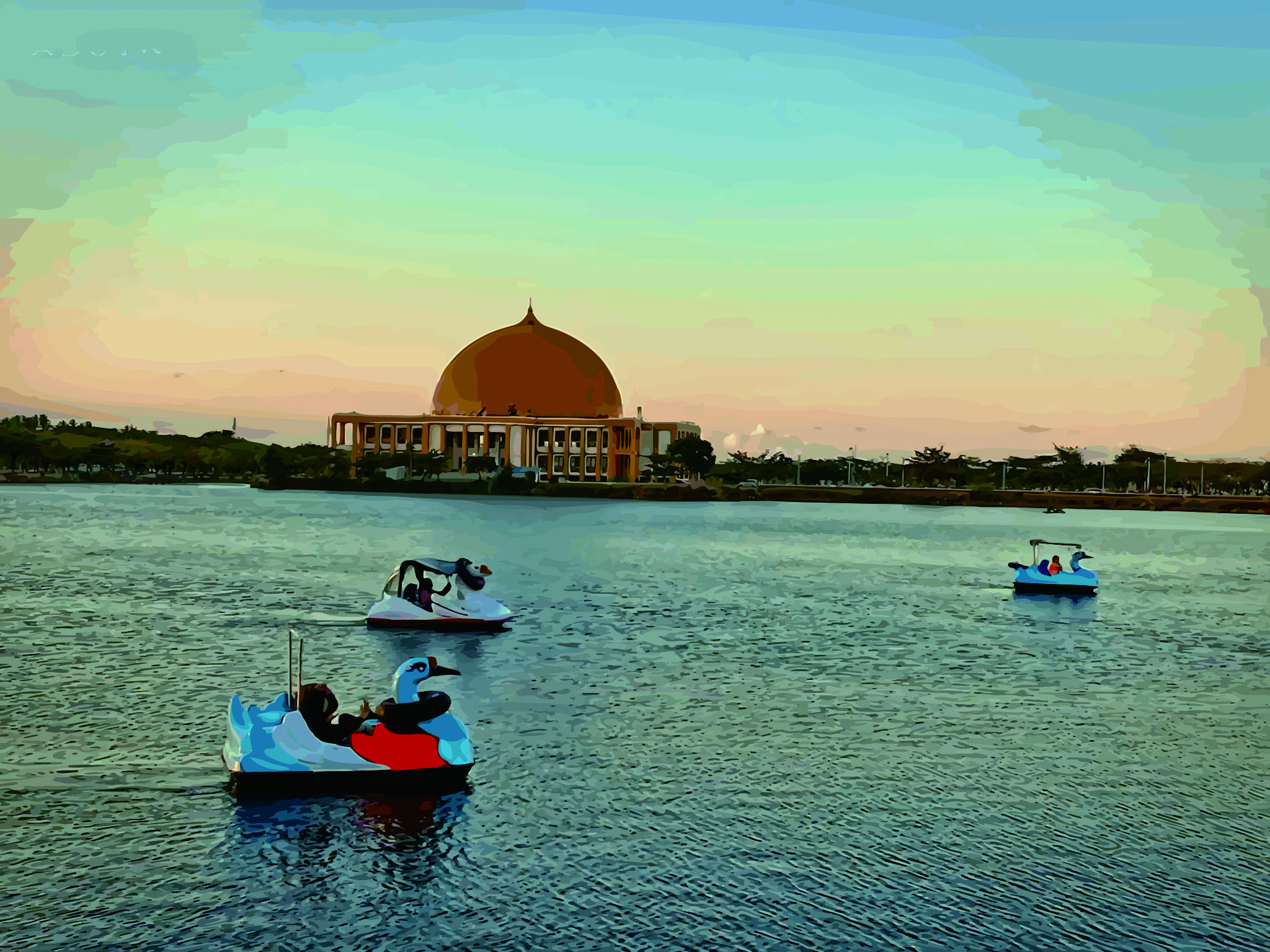
- Raha Bay

- Location in Sulawesi and Indonesia Raha (Indonesia)
- Coordinates: 4°49′52″S 122°43′26″E
- Country: Indonesia
- Region: Sulawesi
- Province: Southeast Sulawesi
- Regency: Muna Regency
- Founded: 1906

Area
  - Total: 155.03 km^{2} (59.86 sq mi)

Population (2018)
  - Total: 69,980
  - Density: 451.4/km^{2} (1,169/sq mi)
- Time zone: UTC+8 (ICST)
- Area code: (+62) 403

Raha is the main town and port on Muna Island, Southeast Sulawesi, Indonesia. Raha is the capital of Muna Regency.

The Raha town is located on the coast of the Buton Strait, is the capital of Muna Regency, within Southeast Sulawesi Province. The total area of the town is 155.03 km^{2} consisting of Katobu District and parts of neighbouring districts, altogether comprising 12 kelurahan and `5 desa, with a population of 2018 of 69,980 people. The limits of Raha are as follows:

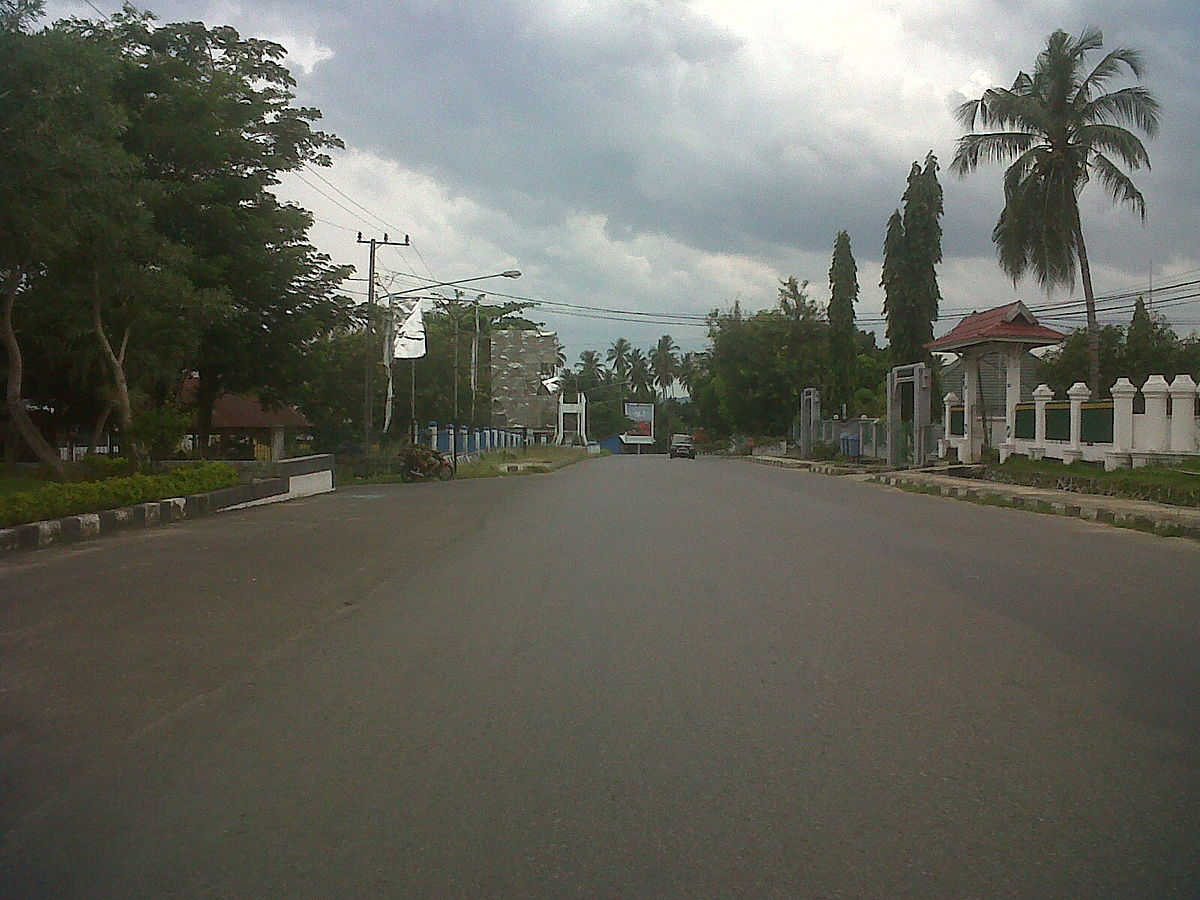
Main Road

- North side is bordered by Napabalano District;
- South side is bordered by Banggai Village, Duruka District;
- The East is bordered by the Buton Strait;
- West side is bordered by Wali Village, Watopute District

The metropolitan area was estimated in 2018 as covering 1,030.24 km^{2} with 84,920 population.

== History ==
Raha town was founded in 1906 by the Dutch Colonial Government, and at the same time became the capital of the Muna (Wuna) Kingdom which was moved from Kotano Wuna. The regime of Raja Muna La Ode Ngkalili was overthrown, with the appointment of La Ode Ahmad as the Netherlands appointee in Muna. Economic development followed in 1910, with construction of the central market in 1920, construction of air infrastructure and facilities in 1930, and construction of cotton plants in 1937. During the Japanese occupation of 1942–1945, Raha was the seat of the Bunken Muna government. On 14 July 1959, Raha officially became the capital of Muna Regency. In 2015, the Indonesian Government was considering proposals to separate Raha from Muna Regency and establish it as an autonomous city within Southeast Sulawesi.

== Tourist Attraction ==
- Liangkabori Cave

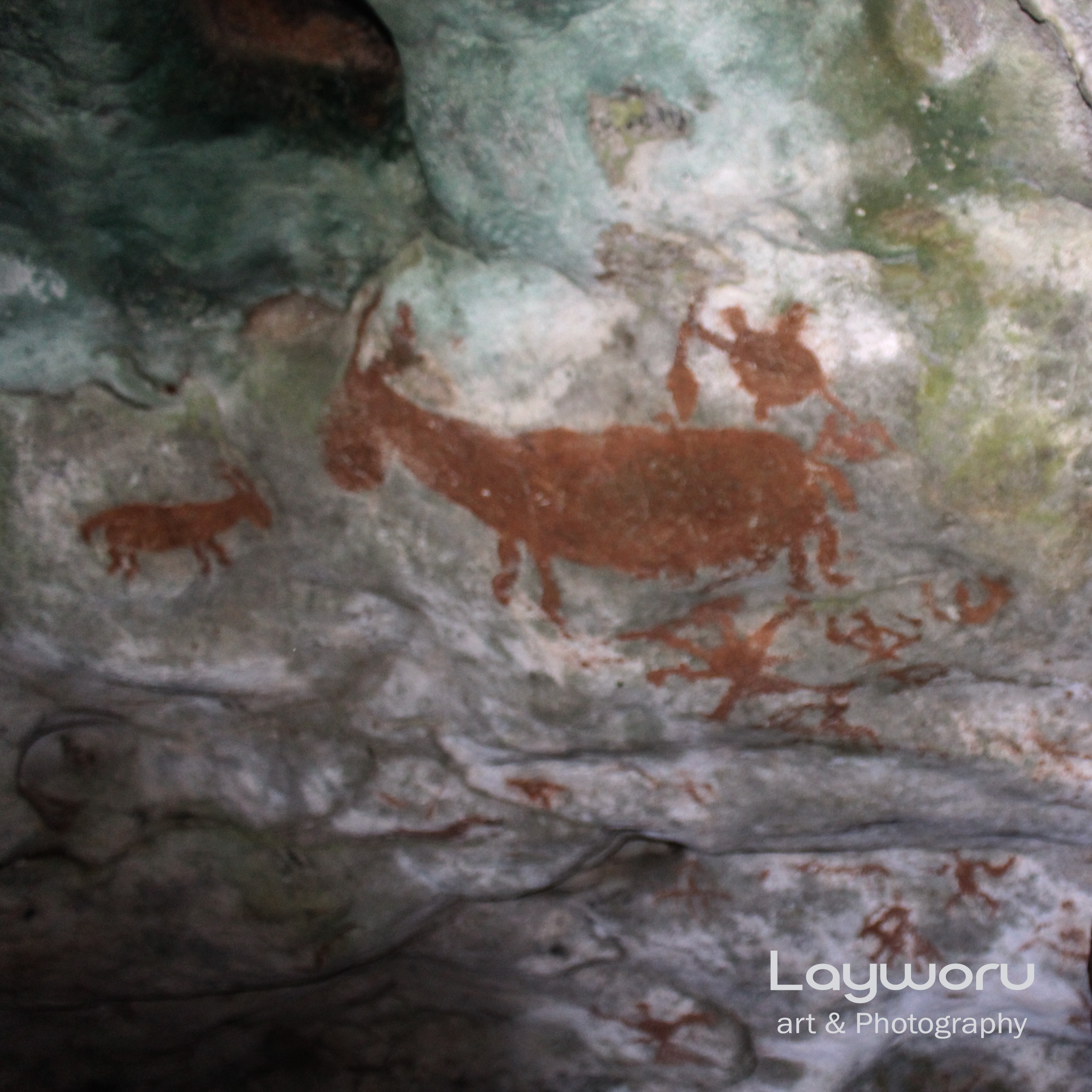
An animal paint on Liangkabori Cave

- Al Munajat Mosque
- Raha Bay

== Notable people ==
- L.M. Idrus Effendi, Indonesian politician and journalist
- Saddil Ramdani, Indonesian footballer
