= Pancana language =

Celebic language spoken in Indonesia

Pancana
- Native to: Sulawesi, Indonesia
- Region: Buton Island
- Native speakers: (7,000 cited 1991–2005)
- Language family: Austronesian: Malayo-Polynesian; Celebic; Muna–Buton; Munan; Munic; Western; Pancana

Language codes
- ISO 639-3: Either: pnp – Pancana ues – Kioko
- Glottolog: panc1247 Pancana kiok1239 Kioko

Pancana is an Austronesian language of Buton Island, off the southeast coast of Sulawesi in Indonesia. It belongs to the Muna–Buton branch of the Celebic subgroup. It is in the Munic subbranch of the Muna–Buton languages.
