= Wolio language =

Austronesian language spoken in Southeast Sulawesi, Indonesia

Wolio
- Buton
- بُرِ وٚلِيٚ
- Native to: Indonesia
- Region: Southeast Sulawesi
- Ethnicity: Wolio people
- Native speakers: 65,000 (2004)
- Language family: Austronesian: Malayo-Polynesian; Celebic; Wotu–Wolio; Wolio–Kamaru; Wolio
- Writing system: Buri Wolio (Arabic script)

Language codes
- ISO 639-3: wlo
- Glottolog: woli1241
- Map of languages on the island of Sulawesi, Wotu-Wolio languages is colored in dark blue along with other Celebic languages.

Wolio (Buri Wolio: بُرِ وٚلِيٚ) is an Austronesian language spoken in and around Baubau on Buton Island, Southeast Sulawesi, Indonesia. It belongs to the Wotu–Wolio branch of the Celebic subgroup. Also known as Buton, it is a trade language and the former court language of the Sultan at Baubau. Today it is an official regional language; street signs are written in the Buri Wolio alphabet, based on the Arabic script.

Wolio has lexical borrowings from Malay, Arabic, and Dutch. Local languages of eastern Indonesia, such as Bugis, Makasar, and Ternate, have also been influential. The name "Buton", which also refers generically to various ethnic and linguistic groups of the Buton area, is said to be of Ternatese origin (butu, ‘market; marketplace’).

== Phonology ==
The five vowels are /i e a o u/. The consonant system is characterized by the presence of prenasalized stops, which are treated as a single sound in Wolio.

Consonants
			Labial	Alveolar	Palatal	Velar	Glottal
Nasal			m	n	ɲ	ŋ	
Plosive	voiceless	plain	p	t	c	k	ʔ
Plosive	voiceless	prenasalized	ᵐp	ⁿt	ᶮc	ᵑk	
Plosive	voiced	plain	b	d	ɟ	g	
Plosive	voiced	prenasalized	ᵐb	ⁿd	ᶮɟ	ᵑg	
Plosive	voiced	implosive	ɓ	ɗ			
Fricative	voiceless		f	s			h
Fricative	voiced		v				
Trill				r			
Lateral				l			

/b, d, f/ are found in loans, mostly from Arabic.

Stress is on the penultimate syllable, and only open syllables are allowed.

== Grammar ==
Wolio personal pronouns have one independent form, and three bound forms.

Personal pronouns
	independent	actor	object	possessive
1.sg.	iaku	ku-	-aku	-ngku
1.pl. incl.	ingkita	ta-	-kita	-ta
1.pl. excl.	ingkami	ta-	-kami	-mami
2.sg.	ingkoo	u-	-ko	-mu
2.pl.	ingkomiu	u-	-komiu	-miu
3.	incia	a-	-a/-ia	-na

Number is not distinguished in third person. Optionally, plural number can be expressed by means of the plural-marker manga: manga incia 'they'.

== See also ==
- Cia-Cia language
- List of loan words in Indonesian

== Bibliography ==
- Anceaux, Johannes Cornelis (1988). The Wolio Language. Leiden: Brill. doi:10.1163/9789004286320.
- Anceaux, Johannes Cornelis; Grimes, Charles E.; van den Berg, René (1995). "Wolio". In Tryon, Darrell T. (ed.). Comparative Austronesian Dictionary: An Introduction to Austronesian Studies. Trends in Linguistics. Documentation. Vol. 10. Berlin/New York: Walter de Gruyter. pp. 573–584. doi:10.1515/9783110884012.1.573. ISBN 978-3-11-088401-2. OCLC 896406022.
- Donohue, Mark (2004). "The pretenders to the Muna-Buton group". In Bowden, J.; Himmelmann, N. (eds.). Papers in Austronesian subgrouping and dialectology. Pacific Linguistics 563. Canberra: Australian National University. pp. 21–36. doi:10.15144/PL-563.21. hdl:1885/146183.
- Mead, David (2003). "Evidence for a Celebic supergroup". In Lynch, John (ed.). Issues in Austronesian historical phonology. Pacific Linguistics 550. Canberra: Australian National University. pp. 115–141. doi:10.15144/PL-550.115. hdl:1885/146173.
