= Muna Island =

Island in Southeast Sulawesi, Indonesia

Muna
Native name: Wuna (Witeno Wuna)
- Location within Sulawesi

Geography
- Location: South East Asia
- Coordinates: 5.0°S 122.5°E
- Area: 3,219.84 km^{2} (1,243.19 sq mi)
- Highest elevation: 250 m (820 ft)
- Highest point: Unnamed

Administration
- Indonesia
- Province: Southeast Sulawesi
- Largest settlement: Raha (pop. 55,730)

Demographics
- Population: 368,654 (2020)
- Pop. density: 114.5/km^{2} (296.6/sq mi)
- Ethnic groups: Muna people, Butonese people, Bugis, Javanese

Additional information
- Time zone: WITA (UTC+8)

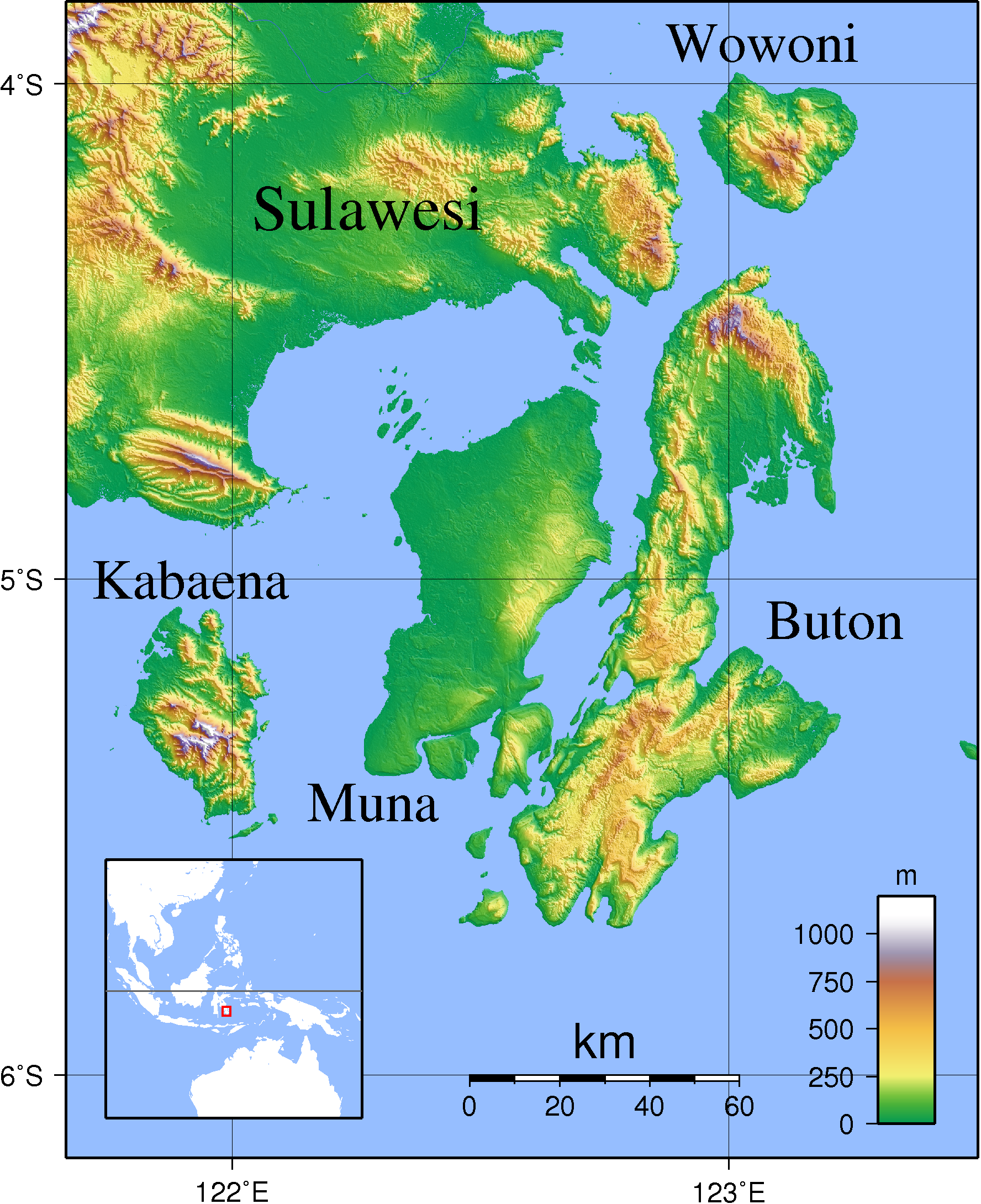
Muna within the Buton Archipelago

Muna (Pulau Muna) is an island in the Southeast Sulawesi province of Indonesia with an area of 3,219.84 km^{2} (1,243.19 sq mi) and had a population of 316,293 at the 2010 Census and 368,654 at the 2020 Census. It is just southeast of the island of Sulawesi and west of Buton Island. It currently comprises most of three administrative regencies within the province: Muna Regency (Kabupaten Muna), West Muna Regency (Kabupaten Muna Barat), and Central Buton Regency (Kabupaten Buton Tengah).

In January 2026, a team of archaeologist found the oldest cave art currently known, dated at least 67,800 years old; 15,000 years older than the previously found in the region.

Kabupaten	Area in km^{2}	Pop'n Census 2010	Pop'n Census 2020	comprising
Muna Regency (part)	1,627.89	172,435	187,917	all districts except Towea (a group of islands north of Muna), and Pasih Putih, Pasi Kolaga, Wakorumba Selatan, Batukara and Maligano (five districts which lie on Buton Island)
West Muna; Regency (part)	844.23	66,769	78,906	all districts except Tiworo Utara (a group of islands northwest of Muna)
Central Buton; Regency (part)	747.72	77,089	101,831	all districts except Talaga Raya (which lies on Kabaena Island to the west)

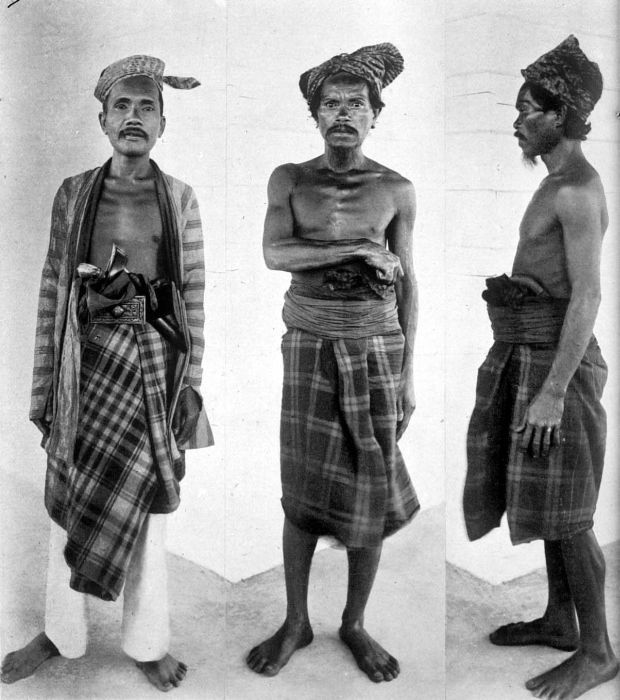
Three men from the Island of Muna, on the left stands a nobleman and in the centre and to the right is a man from the Reha people
