= South Buton Regency =

Regency in Southeast Sulawesi, Indonesia

South Buton Regency Kabupaten Buton Selatan
- Regency
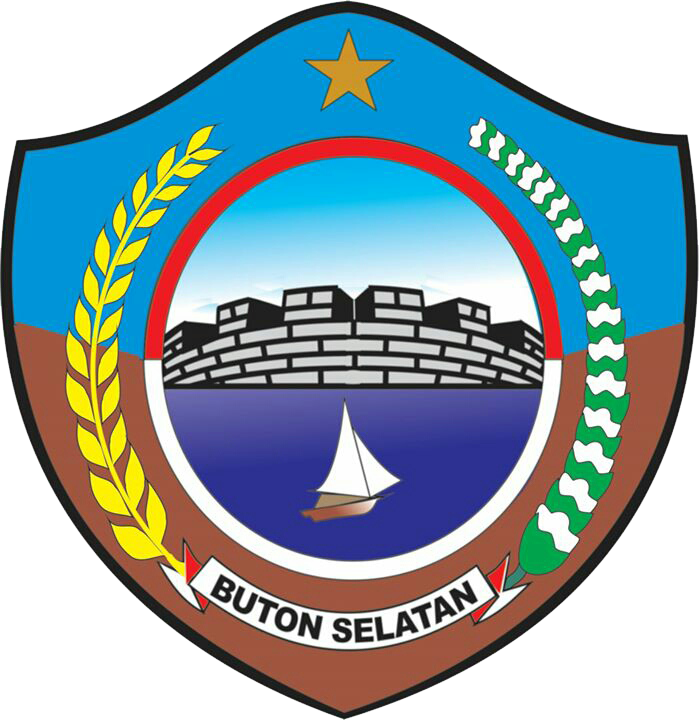
- Coat of arms

- Location within Southeast Sulawesi

- Location in Sulawesi and Indonesia South Buton Regency (Indonesia)
- Coordinates: 5.6792483°S 122.7209625°E
- Country: Indonesia
- Province: Southeast Sulawesi
- Established: 24 July 2014; 12 years ago
- Founder: Government of Indonesia
- Capital: Batauga

Government
  - Regent: Muhammad Adios
  - Vice Regent: La Ode Risawal

Area
  - Total: 510 km^{2} (200 sq mi)

Population (mid 2025 estimate)
  - Total: 104,538
  - Density: 200/km^{2} (530/sq mi)
- Time zone: UTC+8 (ICST)
- Postcode: 93752
- Area code: (+62) 411
- Website: butonselatankab.go.id

South Buton Regency (Indonesian: Kabupaten Buton Selatan) is a regency located on Buton Island in Southeast Sulawesi Province of Indonesia. This regency was formed from the southern part of Buton Regency, from which it was separated by Act No.16 of 2014, dated 23 July 2014. It covers an area of 546.58 km^{2}, and the population of the districts now comprising the new regency was 74,974 at the 2010 Census and 95,261 at the 2020 Census; the official estimate as at mid 2025 was 104,538 (comprising 51,419 males and 53,119 females). The regency capital is located in Batauga.

The Regency contains three districts in the south of Buton Island (bordered by Buton Regency, the city of Baubau, and the Flores Sea), as well as 17 islands (the largest being Kadatua, Siompu and Batu Abas) lying to the west and to the south of Buton Island.

== Administrative districts ==
South Buton Regency is divided into the following seven districts (kecamatan), with their areas and populations at the 2010 Census and the 2020 Census, together with the official estimates as at mid 2025. The table also includes the locations of the district administrative centres, the number of villages in each district (totaling 60 rural desa and 10 urban kelurahan - the latter consisting of 7 in Batauga District and 3 in Sampolawa District), and its post code.

Kode Wilayah	Name of District (kecamatan)	Area in km^{2}	Pop'n Census 2010	Pop'n Census 2020	Pop'n Estimate mid 2025	Admin centre	No. of villages	Post code
74.15.02	Sampolawa	221.95	20,121	23,593	25,739	Mambulu	16 ^{(a)}	94747
74.15.03	Lapandewa ^{(b)}	89.67	7,772	9,857	10,700	Lapandewa	7	93746
74.15.01	Batauga	148.53	13,993	17,807	19,832	Laompo	12 ^{(c)}	93741
74.15.07	Kadatua ^{(d)}	24.04	7,703	10,135	10,917	Kaofe	10	93742
74.15.06	Siompu ^{(e)}	38.62	8,753	11,179	11,990	Biwinapada	10	93743
74.15.05	Siompu Barat (West Siompu)	14.58	8,119	10,392	12,181	Molona	8	93744
74.15.04	Batu Atas ^{(f)}	9.19	8,246	12,298	13,179	Ujung	7	93745
	Totals	546.58	74,974	95,261	104,538	Batauga	70	

Notes: (a) including 3 kelurahan (Jaya Bakti, Katilombu and Todombulu). (b) includes Batumandawu Dua, Batumandawu Satu, La Kuteeno and Labuani islets.
(c) comprises 7 kelurahan (Bandar Batauga, Busoa, Lakambau, Laompo, Majapahit, Masiri and Molagina) and 5 desa.
(d) includes offshore islets of Bungi Napa, Bungi Salata, Kaliwu Liwuto, Liwuto, Kaofe Kansopa and Kaofe Matagholeo.
(e) includes offshore Liwutongkidi islet. (f) includes Kawikawia, Kawikawia Bara, Kawikawia Timbu and Waruata islets.
