= Buton =

Island in Indonesia

- Location within Sulawesi

Geography
- Location: Southeast Asia
- Coordinates: 5°3′S 122°53′E
- Area: 4,727.07 km^{2} (1,825.13 sq mi)
- Highest elevation: 1,100 m (3600 ft)
- Highest point: Unnamed

Administration
- Indonesia
- Province: Southeast Sulawesi
- Largest settlement: Baubau (pop. 159,248)

Demographics
- Population: 414,899 (2020 Census)
- Pop. density: 87.8/km^{2} (227.4/sq mi)
- Ethnic groups: Butonese people

Additional information
- Time zone: WITA (UTC+8)

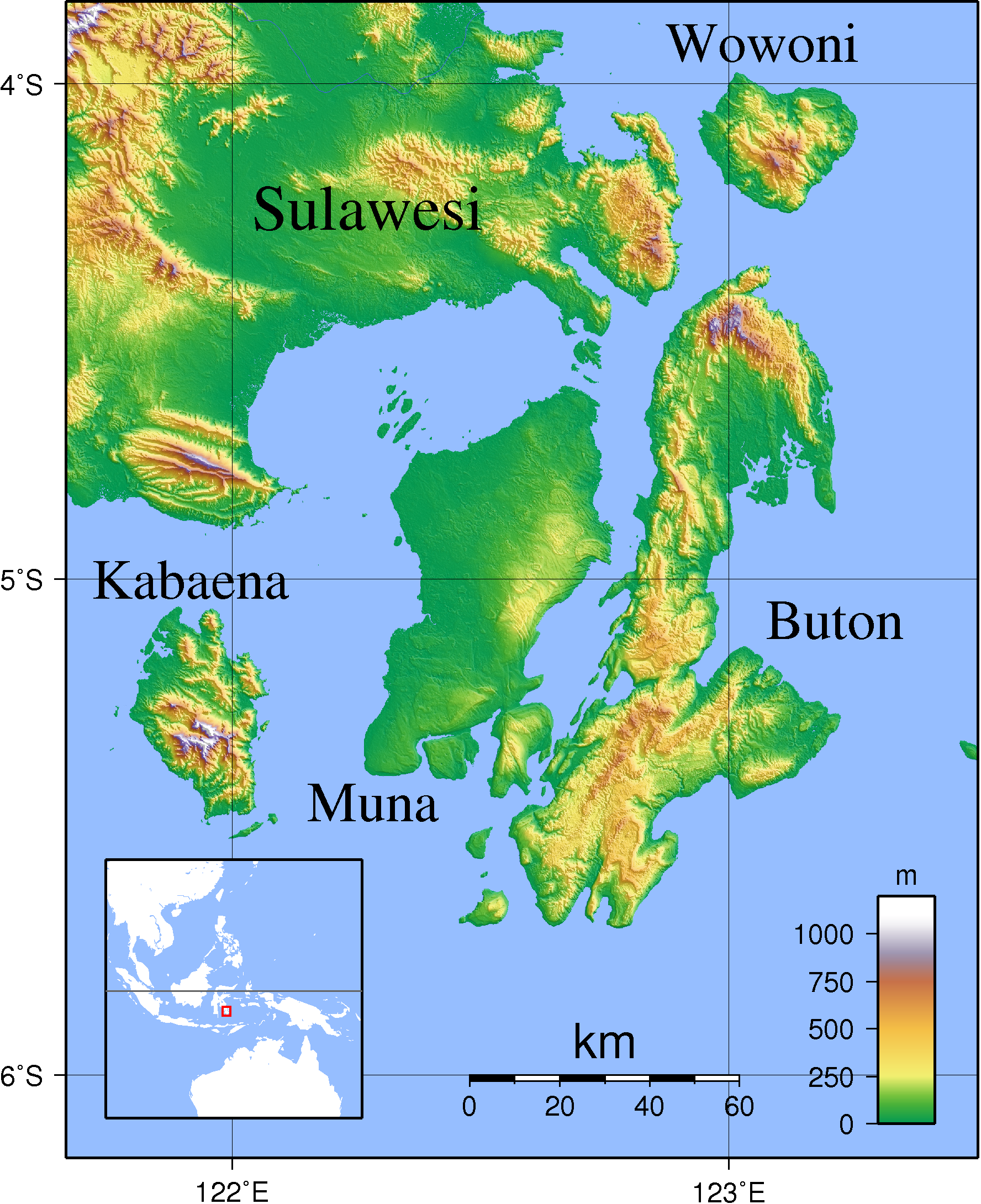
Buton and surrounding islands

Buton (also Butung, Boeton or Button) is an island in Indonesia located off the southeast peninsula of Sulawesi. It covers roughly 4,727 square kilometers in area, or about the size of Madura; it is the 129th largest island in the world and Indonesia's 19th largest in area.

== History ==
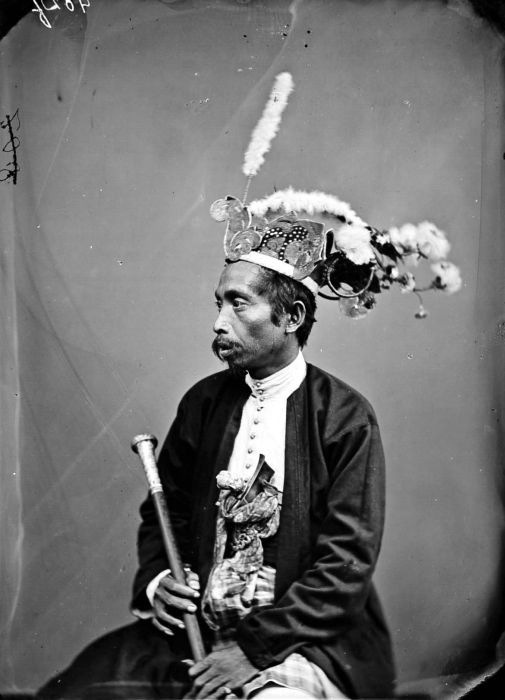
First minister of Buton

In the precolonial era, the island, then usually known as Butung, was within the sphere of influence of Ternate. Especially in the sixteenth century, Buton served as an important secondary regional center within the Ternaten empire, controlling regional trade and collecting tribute to be sent to Ternate.

The Sultanate of Buton ruled over the island from the 14th until the 20th century.

Sultan Murhum, the first Islamic monarch on the island, is remembered in the name of the island's major harbor, Murhum Harbor, in Baubau.

== Geography ==
Its largest town is Baubau, where the Wolio and Cia-Cia languages are spoken. Major nearby islands include Wawonii (to the north), Muna and Kabaena (to the west) and Siumpu (to the southwest). The Tukangbesi Islands lie just to the east where Tukang Besi is spoken, and is separated by the Gulf of Kolowana Watabo (Teluk Kolowana Watabo).

Batuatas Island is to the south. Also the Bouton Passage (as it was known in the pre-Independence era) was an important inter-island navigational location of the northern Flores Sea.

== Ecology ==
The island is largely covered by rainforest and is known for its wildlife. It is one of only two habitats of the anoa, a type of buffalo.

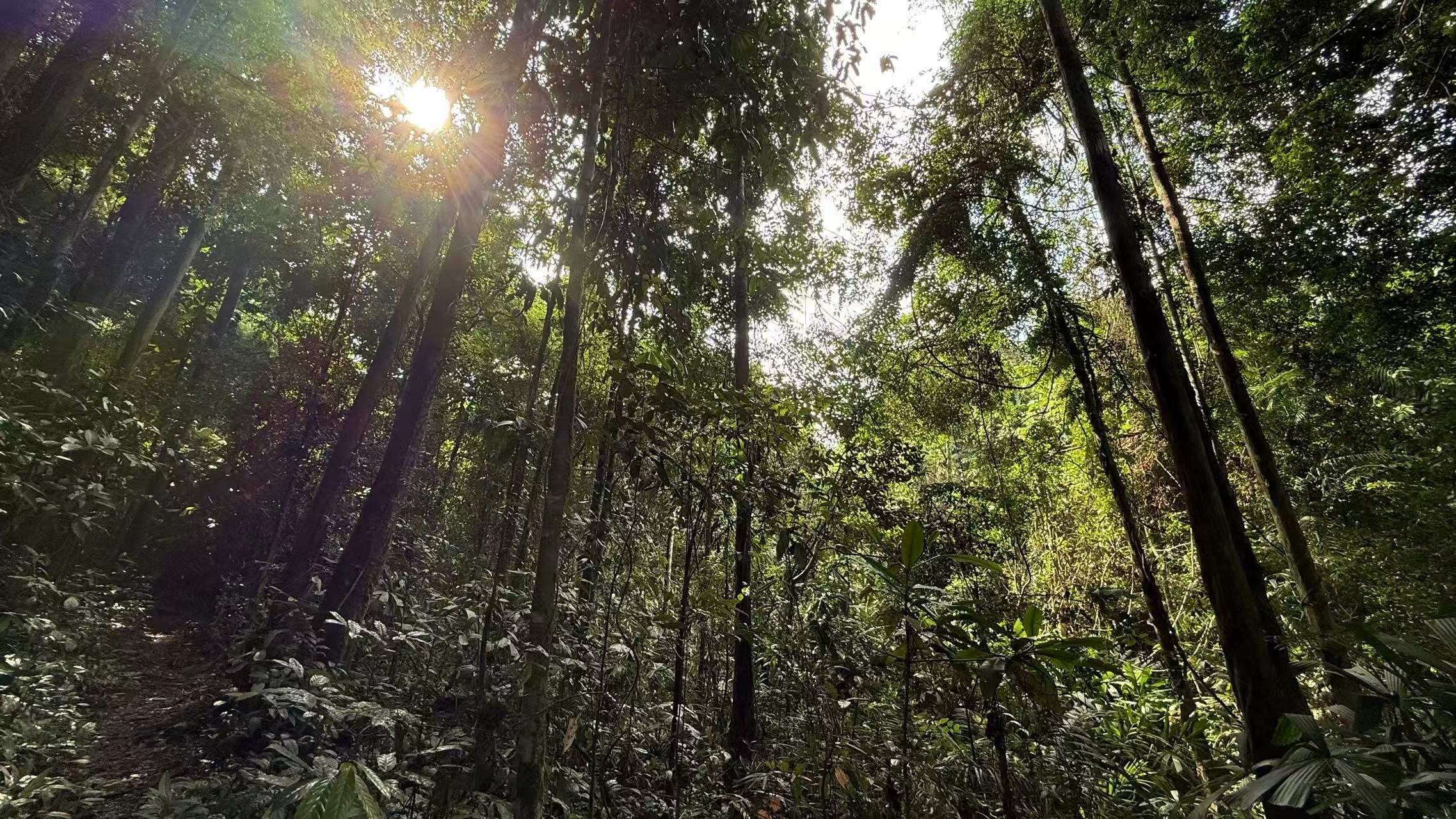
Part of the rainforest on Buton

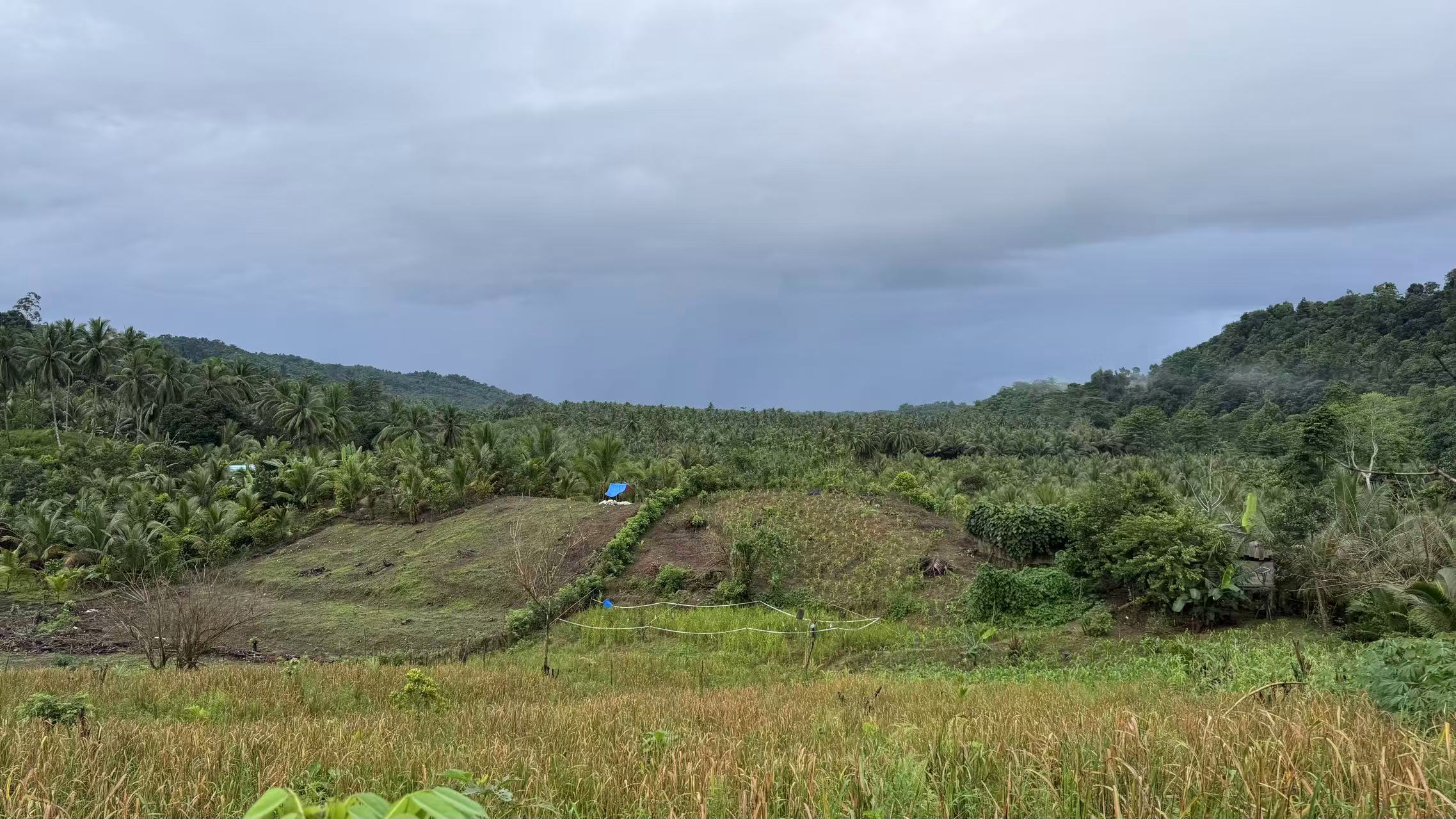
Farmland on Buton

== People ==
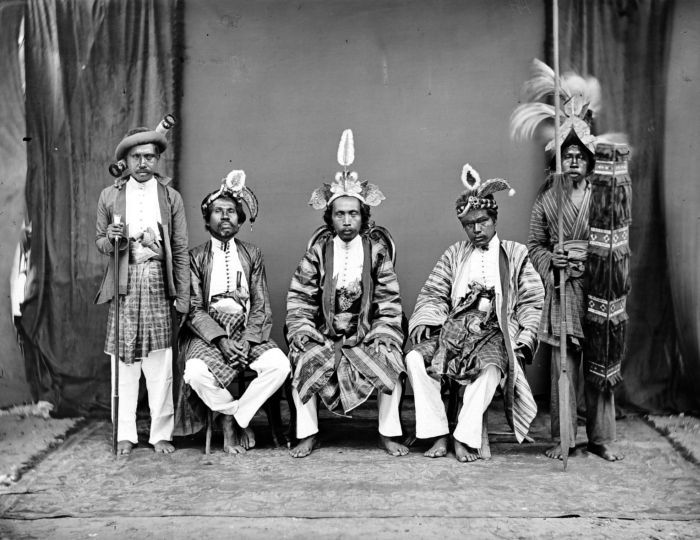
Portrait of a delegation from Buton

The languages spoken on Buton include Wolio, Cia-Cia, various dialects of Muna, Tukang Besi, Kumbewaha, Lasalimu, Kamaru, Pancana, Busoa, Taloki, Kulisusu and Kioko. The Indonesian language, the national language of Indonesia, is also widely used and taught in schools.

In 2009, the Cia-Cia tribe in Baubau city began to use the Korean Hangul alphabet for their language, based on textbooks created by the Hunminjeongeum Society, a linguistic society in Seoul. While ties with the society were temporarily severed in 2011, efforts to preserve Cia-Cia using Hangul were not abandoned. The language continues to be taught using Hangul in schools, and a Cia-Cia dictionary using Hangul was published in 2021.

== Economy ==
The island has a massive reserve of natural asphalt and several other minerals. Asphalt from Buton can be utilized as bitumen modifiers as well as a substitute for petroleum asphalt. As a result, natural asphalt can be used to reduce dependency on conventional fossil based resources.

== Administration ==
Buton Island is administratively divided into five second level administrative divisions (Daerah Tingkat II): Baubau City, Buton Regency, (part of) South Buton Regency (which includes several smaller islands to the west and south of Buton), North Buton Regency and (part of) Muna Regency.

Kabupaten	Area in km^{2}	Pop'n Census 2010	Pop'n Census 2020	comprising
North Buton Regency	1,923.03	54,736	66,653	all districts
Muna Regency (part)	400.78	19,488	22,534	Pasih Putih, Pasi Kolaga, Wakorumba Selatan, Batukara and Maligano districts
Buton Regency	1,648.04	94,388	115,207	all districts
Baubau city	295.07	136,991	159,248	all districts
South Buton Regency (part)	460.15	41,886	51,257	Sampolawa, Lapandewa and Batauga districts
Totals	4,727.07	347,489	414,899	

However, the eponymous archipelago is administered under an additional four regencies: the rest of Muna Regency and South Buton Regency, together with West Muna Regency, Wakatobi Regency, Central Buton Regency (which does not include any portion of Buton Island), and (part of) Bombana Regency.
