= Celebic languages =

Subgroup of the Austronesian language family

Celebic
- Geographic distribution: Sulawesi, Indonesia
- Linguistic classification: Austronesian: Malayo-Polynesian; Transitional Western-Central; Celebic
- Proto-language: Proto-Celebic
- Subdivisions: Kaili–Wolio; Eastern

Language codes
- Glottolog: cele1242 Celebic (minus Tolitoli) toli1244 Tolitoli
- Map showing the distribution of the Celebic languages (in dark blue) in Sulawesi alongside other Austronesian languages

The Celebic languages are a subgroup of the Austronesian languages spoken on the Indonesian island of Sulawesi, formerly called Celebes. Almost all of the languages spoken in the provinces of Central Sulawesi and Southeast Sulawesi belong to the Celebic group. A few Celebic languages (e.g. Wotu, Bonerate) are located in South Sulawesi province. By number of languages (but not by number of speakers), Celebic is the largest subgroup of Austronesian languages on Sulawesi.

== Subgrouping ==
=== Internal classification ===
David Mead (2003a:125) classifies the Celebic languages as follows.

- Celebic
  - Tomini–Tolitoli
  - Kaili–Pamona
  - Wotu–Wolio
  - Eastern
    - Saluan–Banggai
    - Southeastern
      - Bungku–Tolaki
      - Muna–Buton

More recently, Zobel (2020) proposed that Kaili–Pamona and Wotu–Wolio form a Kaili–Wolio group, which Zobel places as a primary subgroup of Celebic. Furthermore, in Zobel's (2020) classification, Kaili–Wolio is placed as a sister to group to Tominic–Eastern Celebic, which contains Mead's (2003) Tomini–Tolitoli and Eastern Celebic groups.

=== Position within Austronesian ===
At the current state of research, the Celebic languages are considered to make up a primary branch of the Malayo-Polynesian subgroup within the Austronesian language family.

== Proto-Celebic ==
Proto-Celebic
- Reconstruction of: Celebic languages
- Region: Sulawesi
- Reconstructed ancestors: Proto-Austronesian: Proto-Malayo-Polynesian
- Lower-order reconstructions: Proto-Muna-Buton; Proto-Bungku-Tolaki

David Mead (2003a:125) lists the following sound changes for Proto-Celebic and its subgroups.

1. Proto-Malayo-Polynesian to Proto-Celebic
  - *C_{1}C_{2} > *C_{2} (C_{1} not nasal)
  - *h > Ø
  - *d > *r
  - *ay, *-ey > *e
  - *-aw, *-ew > *o
  - *j > *y, Ø
2. Proto-Celebic to Proto-Eastern Celebic
  - *e (schwa) > *o
  - *-iq > *eq
  - antepenultimate *a > *o
3. Proto-Eastern Celebic to Proto-Saluan–Banggai
  - *-awa- > *oa
  - *-b, *-g > *p, *k
  - *q > *ʔ
4. Proto-Eastern Celebic to Proto-Southeastern Celebic
  - *-w- > Ø
  - *s > *s, *h
  - *Z > *s
  - *ñ > n
  - *b > *b, *w
5. Proto-Southeastern Celebic to Proto-Bungku–Tolaki
  - *q > *ʔ
  - *w- > *h
  - *ʀ > Ø initially and contiguous to *i
6. Proto-Southeastern Celebic to Proto-Muna–Buton
  - *w > Ø
  - final consonant loss (?)

== See also ==
- Languages of Sulawesi
- South Sulawesi languages
