= Makassar people =

Ethnic group in Indonesia

Makassarese people
ᨈᨘᨆᨀᨔᨑ Tu-Mangkasaraʼ (in Makassarese)
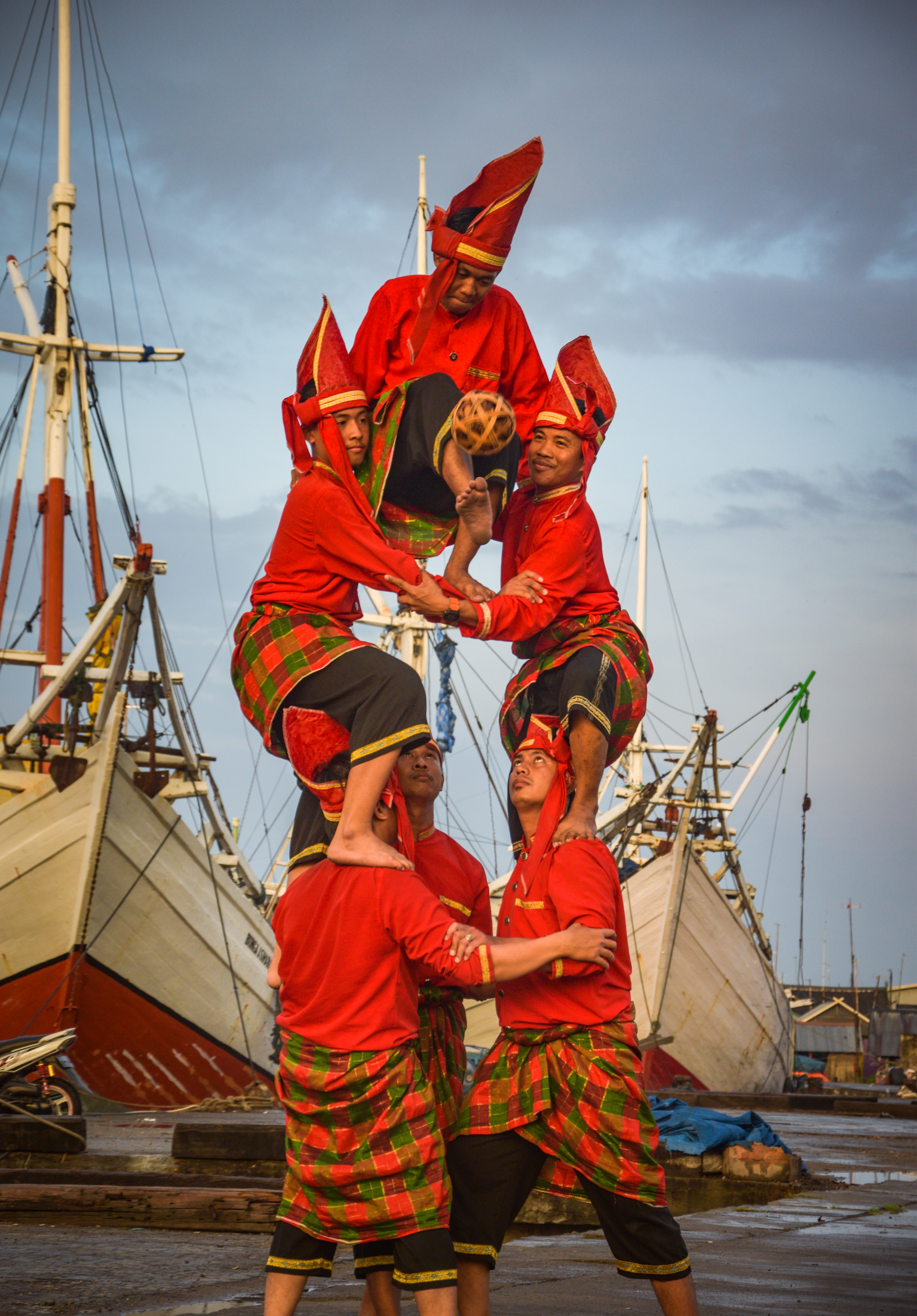
- The native Makassar men performing Paraga in their traditional clothing.

Total population
- 2,672,590 (2010 census)

Regions with significant populations
- Indonesia (2010 census): 2,672,590
- South Sulawesi: 2,380,208
- Southeast Sulawesi: 59,301
- West Papua: 41,239
- East Kalimantan: 31,701
- Jakarta: 29,444
- West Sulawesi: 25,367

Languages
- Native: Makassarese; Dialects: Makassar proper (Makassar city), Coastal Makassar (Takalar, Jeneponto), Inland Makassar (Gowa, Maros); Also: Indonesian, Makassar Malay (Makassar Malay, often spoken in coastal areas and by non-Makassar people), Arabic (for religious use)

Religion
- Islam

Related ethnic groups
- Austronesian peoples: Bugis; Mandar; Selayar; Torajan

The native Makassar, Macassar, Makassarese, (Note: /məkasəˈrēz/ mə-KASS-ər-EEZ, /məˈkæsər/, /-ˈrēs/ -reess; Indonesian: Orang Makassar) Makassan (in Thai), or Macassan (in Australian English), are one of the Austronesian people native to the southern Celebic peninsular regions (concentrated around the Makassar area) in Indonesia. The Makassar people are rich in culture and they are acknowledged for their traditional culinary and maritime knowledges, together with the Bugis, its closest related ethnic group. The Makassar people speak various Makassaric languages, including Standard Makassarese, as well as Standard Indonesian and Makassar Malay.

The Phinisi, is a type of boat-building used for sailing boats in Indonesia. it is of Southern Sulawesi-origin, a joint invention of Bugis-Makassar people.It is internationally inscribed as the Intangible Cultural Heritage of Humanity by the United Nations Educational, Scientific and Cultural Organization (UNESCO).

The Makassar people are amongst the first native people who are endowed with the harvesting and processing knowledge of holothuroidea (sea cucumber, natively found between the Wallace and Weber line), and was spread to another regions beyond its native homeland throughout the Indonesian Archipelago to the Oceania (and some another regions of Asia–Pacific) due to their seafaring activity (mostly departed from Makassar port in Makassar Strait), their knowledge is better-known as trepanging (in Australian English), rooted from the native Makasar word “taripang” (lit. 'sea cucumber'). Furthermore, the knowledge in fauna sector is not an exception, the Makassar oil is one of it, a herbal oil extracted from their own Makassar ebony (mixed with another herbal ingredients), was famously used for haircare treatment amongst the Western Europeans. In several Oceanic countries, one of the ingredients for Makassar oil, the Cananga odorata, are still famously known as “Makassar” (but spelt in different orthographical rules of each respective country, such as Mokasoi in Fiji, Mohokoi in Tonga, Mosoʻoi in Samoa, etc.). Almost all Makassar trade activity was recorded as one of the important historical inter-native relationship and businesses of ancient times (especially with the Aboriginal Australians and several Oceanian natives).

Nowadays, the Makassar diaspora could be found across regions beyond their native homeland in southern Sulawesi; in Indonesia itself, the Makassar diaspora could be found in several regions of the Nusa Tenggara islands, the Pangkajene islands, parts of Sangkarang and Kangean archipelagoes, the Selayar Islands (known as Selayar people), the Sumenep and Pamekasan regions of Madura, parts of Kalimantan island, and so on. Meanwhile outside of Indonesia, the diasporic Makassar community could be found in Insular Southeast Asia and its vicinity (such as Australia, Thailand, etc.), as well as some African countries (such as Mozambique in Eastern Africa and South Africa in Southern Africa). It is also believed that the Makassar people migrated to Madagascar (with the migration route starting from Southern Sulawesi to Southern Kalimantan, next to Java around Sunda Strait, and then to Madagascar).

== History ==
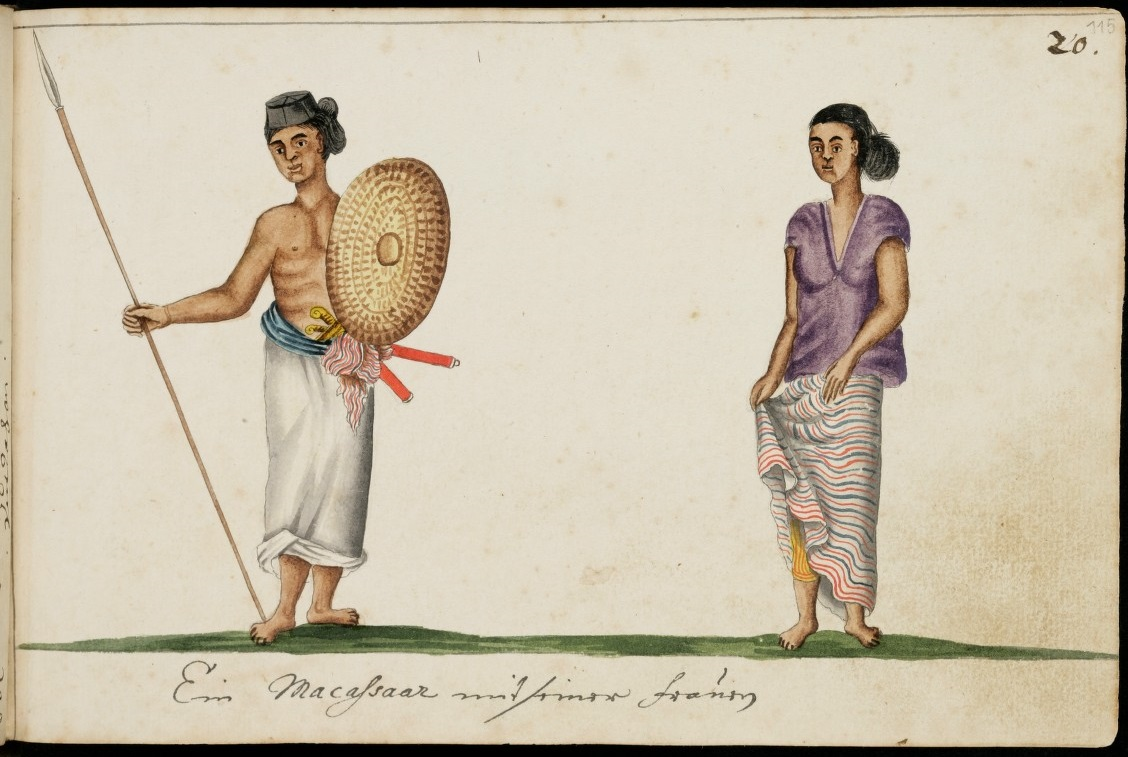
A Makassar couple, European illustration from the 17th century

The Makassar are an ethnic group originally from the southern coast of the island of Sulawesi. Their exploratory spirits have led to successful overseas explorations. This is exemplified by the Kingdom of Gowa (14–17th century), which succeeded in forming a vast Islamic empire with a large and strong naval force. Its territory included almost the entire island of Sulawesi, eastern Kalimantan, East Nusa Tenggara, part of West Nusa Tenggara, part of Maluku and some small surrounding islands. The Makassar people made treaties with Bali and cooperated with Malacca and Banten, as well as some other kingdoms within the archipelago. Similar treaties were sometimes struck with foreign powers, especially with the Portuguese. However, until its fall, Gowa was also engaged in ongoing wars with the Netherlands.

The Makassar are known to have explored large sections of the world's oceans, reaching as far as South Africa. In South Africa there is an area called “Macassar”. It is suspected that the local population is of mixed indigenous and Makassar descent. Meanwhile, the name Maccassar is likely to have originated from the name for their ancestors' homeland. There are several places named Maccassar in South Africa and neighbouring Mozambique.

== Contact with Australia ==
Makassar trepangers from the southwest corner of Sulawesi visited the coast of northern Australia in the eighteenth and nineteenth centuries to collect and process trepang (also known as sea cucumber), a marine invertebrate prized for its culinary and medicinal values in Chinese markets. The term Makassan (or Macassan) is generally used to apply to all the trepangers who came to Australia, although some were from other islands in the Indonesian Archipelago, including Timor, Rote and Aru.

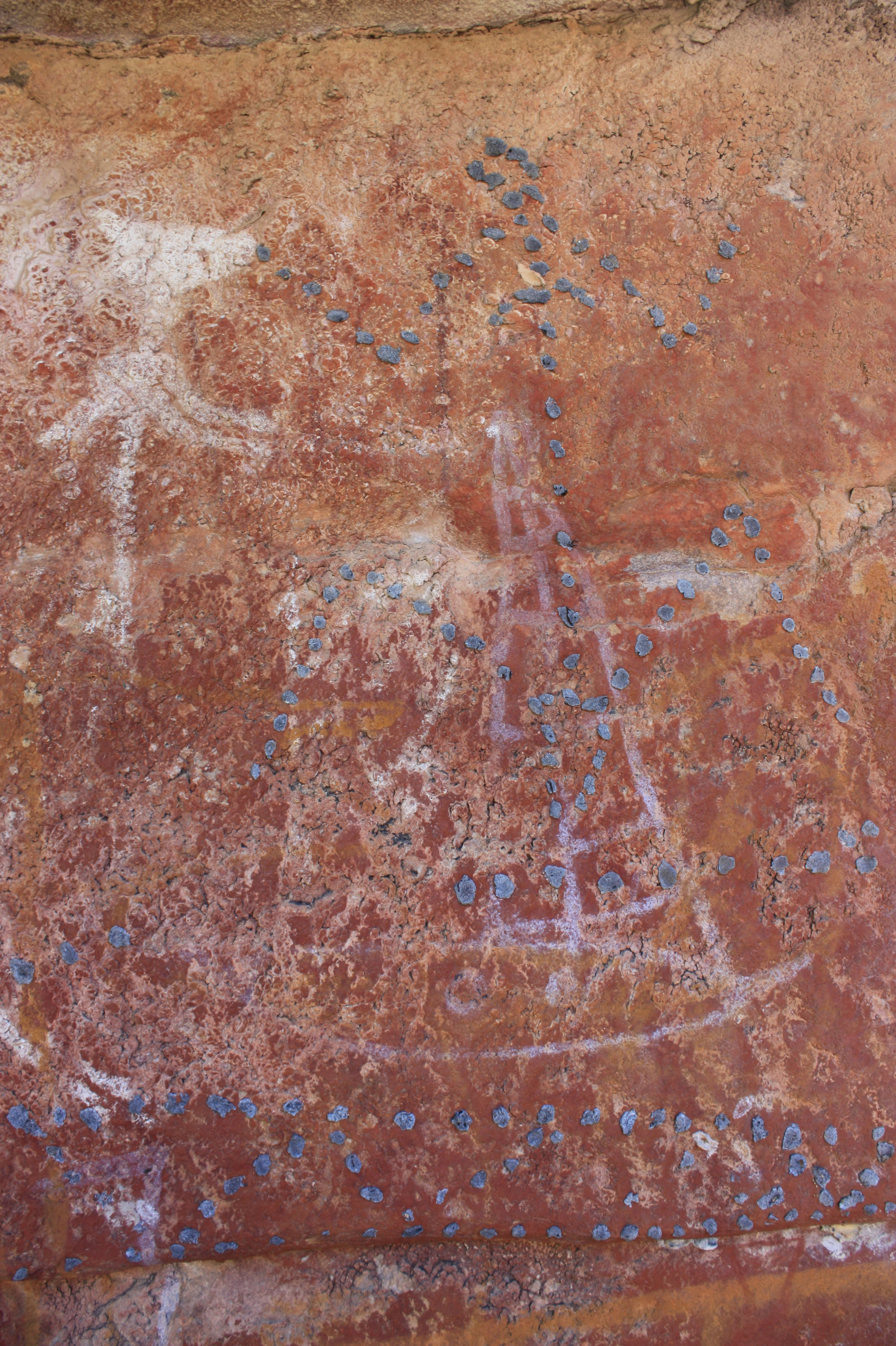
A female figure outlined in beeswax over painting of a white Macassan prau

Fishing fleets began to visit the northern coasts of Australia from Makassar in southern Sulawesi, Indonesia from about 1720, but possibly earlier. While Campbell Macknight's classic study of the Makassan trepang industry accepts the start of the industry as about 1720, with the earliest recorded trepang voyage made in 1751, Regina Ganter of Griffith University notes a Sulawesi historian who suggests a commencement date for the industry of about 1640. Ganter also notes that for some anthropologists, the extensive impact of the trepang industry on the Yolngu people suggests a longer period of contact. Arnhem Land rock art, recorded by archaeologists in 2008, appears to provide further evidence of Makassan contact in the mid-1600s. Contact has even been proposed from as early as the 1500s.

At the height of the trepang industry, Makassans ranged thousands of kilometres along Australia's northern coasts, arriving with the north-west monsoon each December. Makassan perahu or praus could carry a crew of thirty members, and Macknight estimated the total number of trepangers arriving each year as about one thousand. The Makassan crews established themselves at various semi-permanent locations on the coast, to boil and dry the trepang before the return voyage home, four months later, to sell their cargo to Chinese merchants. Marege' was the Makassan name for Arnhem land, (meaning literally "Wild Country") from the Cobourg Peninsula to Groote Eylandt in the Gulf of Carpentaria. Kayu Jawa was the name for the fishing grounds in the Kimberley region of Western Australia, from Napier Broome Bay to Cape Leveque. Other important fishing areas included West Papua, Sumbawa, Timor, Flores, and Selayar. Matthew Flinders in his circumnavigation of Australia in 1803, met a Makassan trepang fleet near present day Nhulunbuy. He communicated at length with a Makassan captain, Pobasso, through his cook, who was also a Malay, and learned of the extent of the trade from this encounter. Ganter writes that there were at most "1,000 Macassans" compared to the almost "7,000 British nestled into Sydney Cove and Newcastle." Nicholas Baudin also encountered 26 large perahu off the northern coast of Western Australia in the same year. Ganter states that the British settlements of Fort Dundas and Fort Wellington were established as a result of Phillip Parker King's contact with Makassan trepangers in 1821.

Using Daeng Rangka, the last Makassan trepanger to visit Australia, lived well into the 20th century and the history of his voyages are therefore well documented. He first made the voyage to northern Australia as a young man. He suffered dismasting and several shipwrecks, generally positive but occasionally conflicting relationships with Indigenous Australians, and was the first trepanger to pay the South Australian government trepanging licence in 1883, an impost that made the trade less viable. The trade continued to dwindle toward the end of the 19th century, due to the imposition of customs duties and licence fees and probably compounded by over fishing. Using Daeng Rangka commanded the last Makassar perahu, which left Arnhem Land in 1907.

== Lifestyle ==
The main source of income of the Makassar is rice farming; however, they are also famous throughout Indonesia for their skill in trading and as fishermen. This includes the harvesting of sea cucumbers, a practice known in Indonesian as trepanging.

Labor division is strict because of the rigid separation of the sexes, as in all traditional Muslim communities. Men are engaged in matters outside the house such as farming, fishing, etc. Women are usually responsible for the household duties, while the man is the head of the family. While they are in public, respect should be shown to him by the wife and children. Usually the final decisions concerning the family are made by the husband. In rural areas, arranged marriage is still widely practiced.

Polygamy is accepted by the Makassar people, but, since a separate house must be provided for each wife, it is only practiced among the wealthy people.

Siri (respect and honor) is the social code by which the Makassar live. Anyone seriously offending another person's siri carries the risk of being killed, in which case authorities often refuse to intervene. The Makassar often help their neighbors in matters such as working in the rice fields and building houses.

== Language ==
=== Makassarese language ===
The Makassarese language, also referred to as Basa Mangkasara (ISO code: mak), is the language spoken by the Makassar people. This language is classified as part of Makassaric branch of the South Sulawesi subgroup which in turn is part of the Malayo-Polynesian branch of the Austronesian language family.

=== Makassar Malay language ===
Commonly known as "Logat Makassar" (Makassar Dialect; ISO code: mfp) is a creole of Malay. This language is used as the language of commerce in the port of Makassar, South Sulawesi. The number of speakers reached 1.889 million in 2000 and is expected to continue to grow until it reaches ± 3.5 million inhabitants. The language is mostly used by immigrants from outside the city of Makassar, Makassar City Population, Youth Makassar, or people who are not proficient in Makassarese. This language is spoken along the South Peninsula region of Sulawesi.

== Religion ==
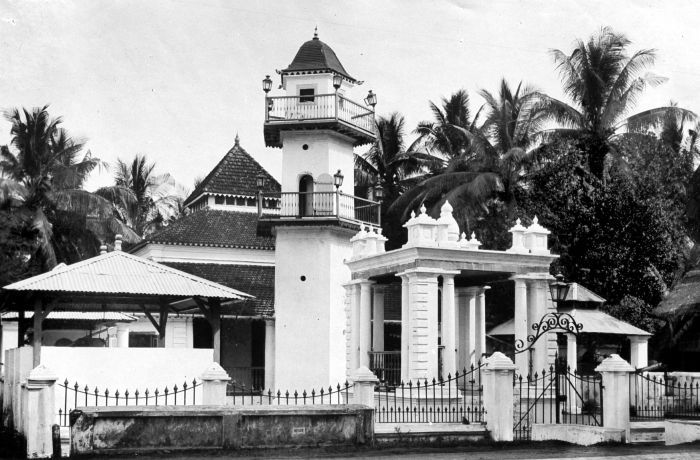
A Makassar mosque in the colonial period, 1930s

In the 16th century, South Sulawesi was a center for trade with Malay Muslim traders. Also Portuguese traders frequently visited the area. Native rulers were generally uncommitted to either Muslim or Christian religions and allowed both to maintain presence. Around 1537, Padre Manuel d’la Costa visited Gowa court, along with Portuguese representatives from Ternate. According to Portuguese records, some Gowan aristocracy converted to Christianity.

According to Antonio de Payva, Portuguese trader and missionary from Malaccas, that had some success converting some Bugis kings from Ajatappareng, when a Portuguese missionary tried to convert 14th Gowa king, I Mangngarangi Daeng Manrabbia, he was reluctant to change his ancestral faith and will invite Malay priests to compare both religions first. Around 1593, He decided to embrace Islam and adopt the title of Sultan Aluddin. He then set Islam as the official religion of Gowa. Payva noted that Malay traders and priests are generally more accepted and trusted compared to Portuguese. Gowa had maintained relationship with traders from Java, Sumatra, Pattani, Pahang, Champa, and Johor ever since 9th Gowa king, Tum’parisi Kallona. According to the text Lontarak Patturiolonga, under the rule of 11th Gowa king, Tunipalangga, these traders were allowed to practice Islam and had special privileges. These communities requested Sultan Muda Alauddin Riayat Shah of Aceh to provide ulama for South Sulawesi, as he is known for sending ulama outside of Aceh.

Three Minangkabau ulama, Dato Ri Bandang, Dato Ri Tiro, and Dato Ri Patimang were sent to spread Islam in South Sulawesi. They visited Riau and Johor to learn about South Sulawesi culture from Bugis-Makassar sailors there. Facilitated by Sultan of Johor, they learned from Wali Songo of Java before eventually arriving in Somba Opu harbour in early 17th century. There are similarities of Islam with native practice of Dewata Sewwae in Luwu Kingdom, which was considered the spiritual center in South Sulawesi. Hence, when the rulers of Luwu converted first, they pushed for conversion in Gowa-Tallo, since they had the power and authority for pushing conversion in South Sulawesi which Luwu lacked. Conversion began slowly and peacefully and adapted with native Ammatoa practitioners centered in Bulukumba.

By 1611, most of the Makasar and Bugis kingdoms had converted. Presently, the Makassar are almost all Muslim, but some traditional pre-Islamic beliefs are still influential, especially in the remote areas.

== Culture ==
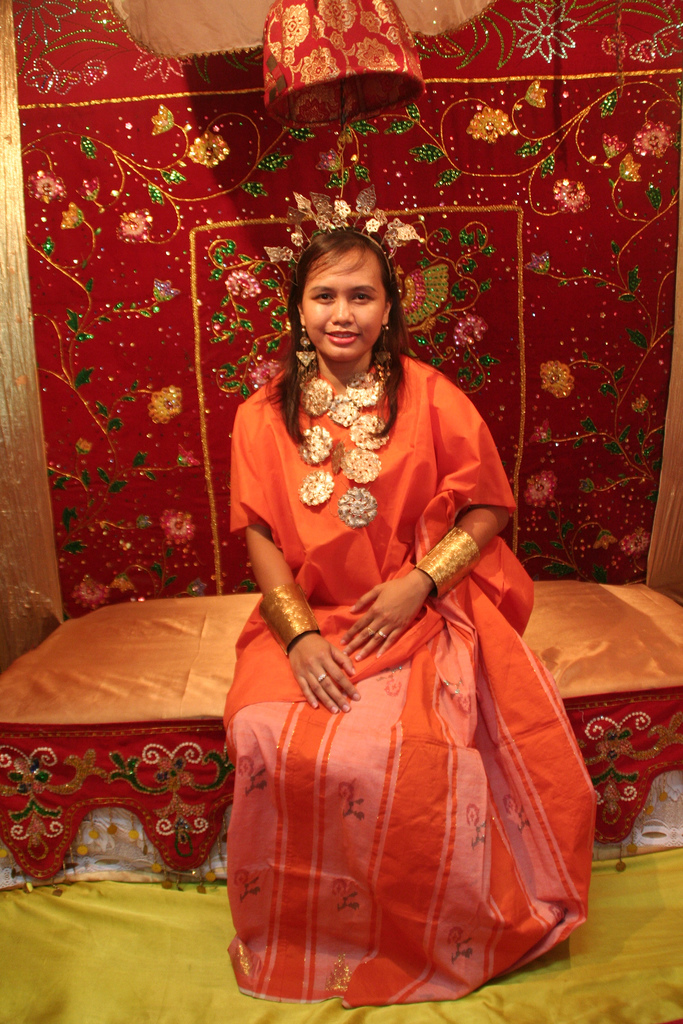
Makassar woman in traditional clothes (baju bodo)

=== Philosophy ===
Culture Siri 'Na Pacce is one cultural philosophy of Bugis-Makassar society.

=== Traditional attire ===
Baju bodo (lit. 'short blouse' in Makassarese) is a traditional upper garment of Makassarese women. The baju bodo has a rectangular shape, and is usually short-sleeved, i.e. half above the elbow. According to Makassar custom, the color of the baju bodo indicates the age or the dignity of the wearer. It is often used for ceremonies such as wedding ceremonies. But now, baju bodo is revitalized through other events such as dance competitions or guest welcome receptions.

=== Cuisine ===
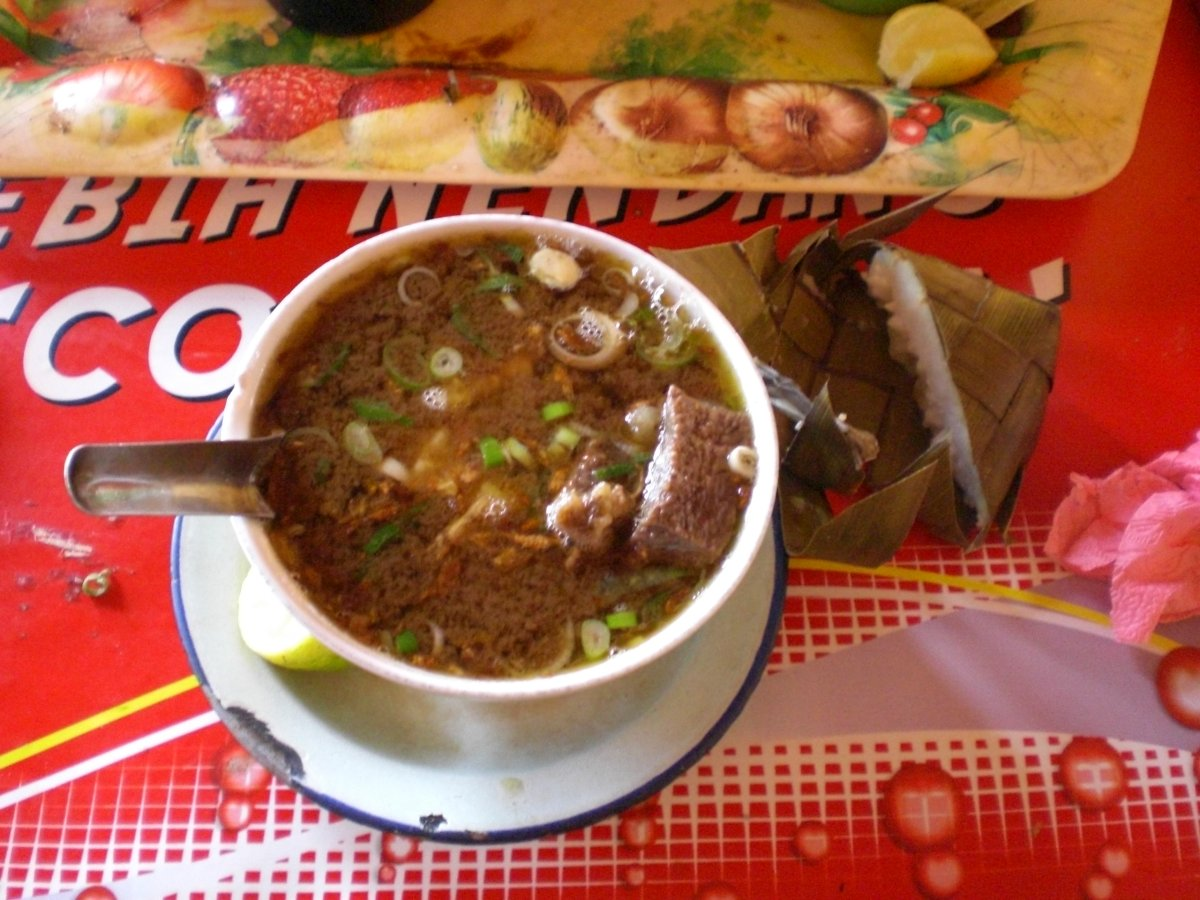
Coto Makassar with ketupat on the side

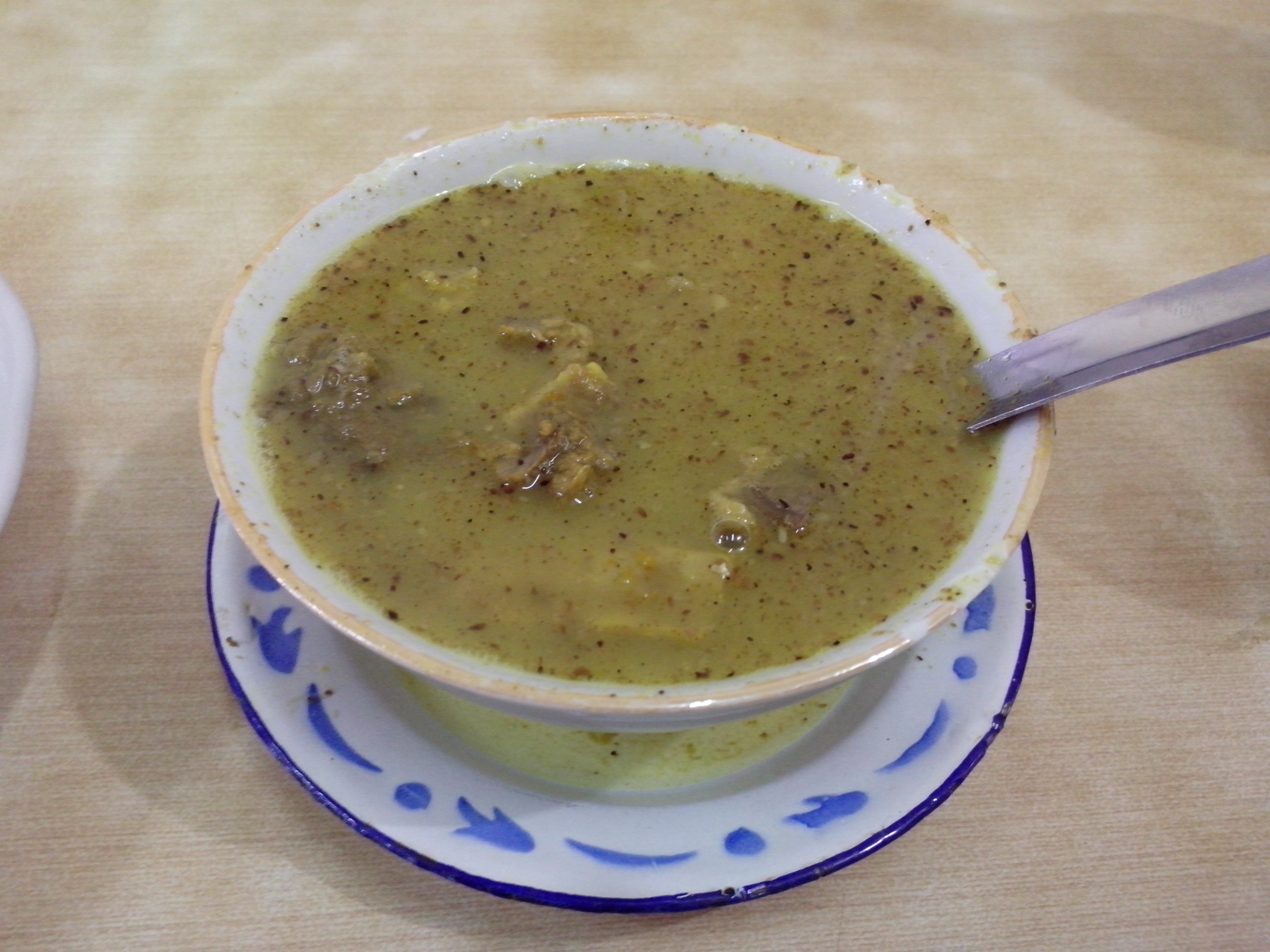
Pallubasa

Makassar cuisine uses a blend of agrarian and maritime ingredients. On west coast cities such as Makassar, Maros, and Pangkep, there are coastal areas directly adjacent to rice fields. Agricultural areas are quite extensive in the Maros and Pangkep regions. Rice and other crops such as bananas are abundant. Most dishes—mainly traditional kues and desserts—are predominantly made from rice and bananas.

Coastal areas of South Sulawesi are important producers of fish, with ponds on the west coast filled with bolu (milkfish), sunu (grouper), shrimps, and crabs. The tradition of fishing in coastal and high seas areas is also well-developed. Among others, tunas are most commonly caught.

The "agrarian pattern" is found in Makassarese dishes which are made from beef or buffalo. Prime examples are coto, konro, sop saudara, and pallubasa.

People who live in coastal cities high in maritime resources predominantly eat fish.

== Bugis–Makassar kinship ==
There is a common misperception that the Makassar people are identical and ethnically cognate to the Buginese people, and that the term Buginese and Makassar are terms that are coined by the Dutch colonials to create a division among them. All potentials were lost once the Sultanate of Makassar fell to the Dutch colonial, since these people were notoriously rebellious against the Dutch colonials. Wherever these people encounter the Dutch colonials, conflicts are bound to happen. Several notable figures centered in Gowa Regency that refused to surrender like Karaeng Galesong, migrated to Central Java. Along with his powerful naval fleet, they would engage in war against any Dutch vassals that they would encounter. Hence, the Dutch colonials at that time under Cornelis Speelman calls him the Si-Bajak-Laut, meaning "the pirate".

In linguistic terms, Makassarese and Buginese are distinct languages, even though both of these languages belong to the South Sulawesi group within the Malayo-Polynesian languages branch of the Austronesian languages. In this category, the Makassarese language is in the same sub-category as Bentong, Coastal and Highland Konjo and Selayar; while Buginese is under the same sub-category as Campalagian language and along with another 2 languages spoken in Kalimantan, Embaloh and Taman. This differences between the Bugis and Makassar people are one of the characteristics that differentiate the two people group.

The idea that the Buginese and Makassar people are ethnically cognate derives from the conquest of kingdoms such as Bone state and Wajo Kingdom by the Sultanate of Gowa.

== See also ==
- Bugis people
- Selayar people
- Ethnic groups in Indonesia
- Overseas Indonesians
- Indonesians
- Austronesian expansion
