= Macassar =

Makassar, Macassar or Makasar may refer to:

== Places, people, language ==
- Makassar, a city in Indonesia
- Makassar Metropolitan Area, a metropolitan area in Indonesia
- Makassar Strait, a strait in Indonesia
- Makassar people, ethnic group inhabiting the southern part of the South Peninsula, in Sulawesi
- Makassarese language, also known as Makassar - one of a group of languages known as Makassaric languages
  - Makasar script, historical letters used to write Makassarese language
  - Makasar (Unicode block)

=== Place names derived from original ===
- Pante Macassar, a city in East Timor
- Makasar, Jakarta, a district of East Jakarta, Indonesia
- Macassar, Western Cape, a town in South Africa
- Macassar Village, Western Cape, an informal settlement in South Africa
- Macassar, Mozambique, a village in north-eastern Mozambique

== Other ==
- Macassar oil, a hair oil
  - Antimacassar, a cloth to protect chairs against soiling by the oil
- Diospyros celebica or Makassar ebony, a species of flowering tree in the family Ebenaceae, endemic to the island of Sulawesi
- Makassar-class landing platform dock, a class of amphibious warfare ships
- "Makassar", a song by Al Bano and Romina Power

== Media ==
- Kompas TV Makassar, previously named Makassar TV, regional television in Makassar, Indonesia
- Auntie Macassar, clown character from The Big Comfy Couch TV show seasons 1–5

== See also ==
- Makassarese (disambiguation)
- Makassan contact with Australia, contact of the Makassar people with Australia
- Makassar uprising
