= Makassarese =

Makassarese may refer to:

- Makassarese people, an ethnic group indigenous to South Sulawesi province, Indonesia
- Makassarese language, language of Makassarese people, at the South Sulawesi, Indonesia
- Makassarese cuisine, a cooking tradition and culinary culture of Makassarese people

== See also ==
- Macassar (disambiguation)
