= Bentong (disambiguation) =

Bentong may refer to:

- Places:
  - Bentong, a town in Pahang, Malaysia
  - Bentong District, Pahang, Malaysia
  - Bentong (federal constituency), represented in the Dewan Rakyat
- People:
  - Bentong (comedian), Filipino comedian
  - Bentong Kali, Malaysian criminal and gangster
- Bentong (crater), a crater on Mars
- Bentong language

== See also ==
- Benton
- Betong (disambiguation)
- Bettong – any of several species of the genus Bettongia, sometimes referred to as rat-kangaroos
