= Echo vowel =

Paragogic vowel that repeats the final vowel in a word

An echo vowel, also known as a synharmonic vowel, is a paragogic vowel that repeats the final vowel in a word in speech. For example, in Chumash, when a word ends with a glottal stop and comes at the end of an intonation unit, the final vowel is repeated after the glottal stop but is whispered and faint, as in [jaʔḁ] for /jaʔ/ "arrow" (written ya).

== Languages ==
In modern Sanskrit, echo vowels are often added in pronunciation to the visarga.

In Rukai, an Austronesian language, vowels are pronounced as full vowels but are predictable and disappear when they are under reduplication or when a suffix beginning with /a/ is added to the word:

Rukai echo vowels and phonemic vowels
	Agent focus	suffix	reduplication
echo vowel	wa-uŋulu	uŋul-a	ara uŋul-uŋulu
	drinks	drink!	don't drink
phonemic vowel	wa-kanə	kanə-a	ara kanə-kanə
	eats	eat!	don't eat

Similarly, in the related Uneapa, echo vowels are added after a Proto-Oceanic final consonant, such as *Rumaq "house" > rumaka.

The Makassaric languages also occurs the echo vowels with stems ending in final /r/, /l/ or /s/. E.g. /botol/ "bottle" is realized as bótolo in Selayar and Coastal Konjo, and as bótoloʔ in Makassarese (the latter regularly adds a glottal stop to the echo vowel). This echo vowel is dropped if a suffix is added, but retained if followed by an enclitic.

Language	stem	base	with suffix	with enclitic
Makassar	/lammor-/	lámmoroʔ 'cheap'	/lammor-/ + /-i/ lammóri 'cheapen'	/lammoroʔ/ + /=i/ lámmoroki 'it's cheap'
Makassar	/lambus-/	lámbusuʔ 'straight'	/lambus-/ + /-i/ lambúsi 'straighten up'	/lambusuʔ/ + /=i/ lámbusuki 'it's straight'
Makassar	/lambus-/	lámbusuʔ 'straight'	/lambus-/ + /-i/ lambúsi 'straighten up'	/lambusuʔ/ + /=aʔ/ lámbusukaʔ 'i am straight'
Selayar	/lambus-/	lámbusu 'straight'	/lambus-/ + /-i/ lambúsi 'straighten up'	/lambusu/ + /=i/ lámbusui 'it's straight'
Selayar	/lambus-/	lámbusu 'straight'	/lambus-/ + /-i/ lambúsi 'straighten up'	/lambusu/ + /=a/ lámbusua 'i am straight'

Echo vowels have also been reconstructed for Proto-Macro-Jê.

== Syllabaries ==
Echo vowels are also found in writing, especially with syllabaries. For example, a word kab may be written as if it were kaba, and keb would be written as if it were kebe. Such a system is found in Maya, with complications depending on the quality of the preceding vowel. In Linear B, such final consonants were simply not written. However, consonant clusters were separated with echo vowels: the city of Knossos is written as if it were Konoso (Linear B: 𐀒𐀜𐀰, ko-no-so).

In Ainu, some writers write final /r/ with a subscript kana for ra, re, ri, ro or ru, depending on the preceding vowel, but others use a subscript ru in all cases.

== See also ==
- Paragoge (paragogic vowel)
