= Epenthesis =

Phonological process involving the addition of one or more sounds to a word

In phonology, epenthesis (/ɪˈpɛnθəsɪs, ɛ-/; Greek ἐπένθεσις) is the addition of one or more sounds to a word, especially in the first syllable (prothesis), the last syllable (paragoge), or between two syllabic sounds in a word. The opposite processes, in which sounds are removed, are syncope and elision.

== Etymology ==
The word epenthesis comes from epi- 'in addition to' and en- 'in' and thesis 'putting'. Epenthesis may be divided into two types: excrescence for the addition of a consonant, and for the addition of a vowel, svarabhakti (in Sanskrit), nēm fatḥa (in Persian) or alternatively anaptyxis (/ˌænəpˈtɪksɪs/).

== Uses ==
Epenthesis arises for a variety of reasons. The phonotactics of a given language may discourage consonant clusters or vowels in hiatus, and a consonant or vowel may be added to help pronunciation. Epenthesis may be represented in writing, or it may be a feature only of the spoken language.

=== Separating vowels ===
A consonant may be added to separate vowels in hiatus, as is the case with linking and intrusive R in English.

- drawing → draw-r-ing

=== Bridging consonant clusters ===
A consonant may be placed between consonants in a consonant cluster where the place of articulation is different (such as if one consonant is labial and the other is alveolar).

- something → somepthing
- hamster → hampster
- *a-mrotos → ambrotos (see below)

=== Breaking consonant clusters ===
A vowel may be placed between consonants to separate them.

- Hamtramck → Hamtramick

=== Other contexts ===
While epenthesis most often occurs between two vowels or two consonants, it can also occur between a vowel and a consonant or at the ends of words. For example, the Japanese prefix ma- (真〜（ま〜）; 'pure …, complete …') transforms regularly to ma'- (真っ〜（まっ〜）; (gemination of following consonant)) when it is followed by a consonant, as in masshiro (真っ白（まっしろ）; 'pure white'). The English suffix -t, often found in the form -st, as in amongst (from among + -st), is an example of terminal excrescence.

== Excrescence ==
Excrescence is the epenthesis of a consonant.

=== Historical sound change ===
- Latin tremulare > French trembler ('to tremble')
- Old English þunor > English thunder
- French messager, passager > English messenger, passenger
- French message, messager > Portuguese mensagem, mensageiro
- (Reconstructed) Proto-Germanic *sēaną > Old English sāwan, Old Saxon sāian ('to sow')
- (Reconstructed) Proto-Greek *amrotos > Ancient Greek ἄμβροτος ámbrotos ('immortal'; cf. ambrosia)
- Latin homine(m) > homne > homre > Spanish hombre ('man')
- Latin audire(m) > ouir > Portuguese ouvir ('to hear')

=== Synchronic rule ===
In French, -t- /t/ is inserted between an inverted subject and verb, when the verb ends in a vowel and the subject is a pronoun beginning with a vowel: il a ('he has') > a-t-il ('has he'); elle s'exclama ('she exclaimed') > s'exclama-t-elle ('exclaimed she'). There is no epenthesis from a historical perspective since the a-t is derived from Latin habet ('he/she has'), and so the t is the original third-person verb inflection. It is incorrect to call it epenthesis unless it is viewed synchronically since the modern basic form of the verb is a and so the psycholinguistic process is the addition of t to the base form.

A similar example is the English indefinite article a, which becomes an before a vowel. It originated from Old English ān ('one, a, an'), which retained an n in all positions, so a diachronic analysis would see the original n disappearing except if a following vowel required its retention: an > a. However, a synchronic analysis, in keeping with the perception of most native speakers, would (though incorrectly) see it as epenthesis: a > an.

In Dutch, whenever the suffix -er (which has several meanings) is attached to a word already ending in -r, an additional -d- is inserted in between. For example, the comparative form of the adjective zoet ('sweet') is zoeter, but the comparative of zuur ('sour') is zuurder and not the expected **zurer. Similarly, the agent noun of verkopen ('to sell') is verkoper ('salesperson'), but the agent noun of uitvoeren ('to perform') is uitvoerder ('performer').

=== Variable rule ===
In English, a stop consonant is often added as a transitional sound between the parts of a nasal + fricative sequence:

- English hamster /ˈhæmstər/ often pronounced with an added p sound, GA: [ˈhɛəmpstɚ] or RP: [ˈhampstə]
- English warmth /ˈwɔːrmθ/ often pronounced with an added p sound, GA: [ˈwɔɹmpθ] or RP: [ˈwɔːmpθ]
- English fence /ˈfɛns/ often pronounced [ˈfɛnts]

=== Poetic device ===
- Latin reliquiās 'remnants, survivors' (accusative plural) > poetic relliquiās

The three short syllables in reliquiās do not fit into dactylic hexameter because of the dactyl's limit of two short syllables so the first syllable is lengthened by adding another l. However, the pronunciation was often not written with double ll, and may have been the normal way of pronouncing a word starting in rel- rather than a poetic modification.

=== In Japanese ===
A limited number of words in Japanese use epenthetic consonants to separate vowels. An example is the word harusame (春雨（はるさめ）; 'spring rain'), a compound of haru and ame in which an /s/ is added to separate the final /u/ of haru and the initial /a/ of ame. That is a synchronic analysis, looking just at the modern language.

As for a diachronic analysis, looking at historical change, this epenthetic /s/ only appears in a small number of compounds coined mostly in Old Japanese, and only applying to a handful of words used as the second element in such compounds. For examples like harusame (春雨（はるさめ）; 'spring rain'), kosame (小雨（こさめ）; 'light rain'), and kirisame (霧雨（きりさめ）; 'drizzle, light rain'), one possibility is that Old Japanese /ame_{2}/ was once pronounced */same_{2}/; the /s/ appearing in these compounds would then be not epenthetic but simply an archaic pronunciation. This is the case for the apparent (but not actually) (second) epenthetic /s/ in massao (真っ青（まっさお）; deep blue, ghastly pale), which is instead from Old Japanese sawo (さ青（さを）; very blue), from the intensifier sa- (さ-) plus merging of the /a/ in sa- and the following /a/ in awo (Old Japanese § Morphophonemics).

== Anaptyxis ==
Epenthesis of a vowel is known as anaptyxis (/ˌænəpˈtɪksɪs/, from Greek ἀνάπτυξις 'unfolding'). Some accounts distinguish between "intrusive" optional vowels, vowel-like releases of consonants as phonetic detail, and true epenthetic vowels that are required by the phonotactics of the language and are acoustically identical with phonemic vowels.

=== Historical sound change ===
==== End of word ====
Many languages insert a so-called prop vowel at the end of a word, often as a result of the common sound change where vowels at the end of a word are deleted. For example, in the Gallo-Romance languages, a prop schwa /ə/ was added when final non-open vowels were dropped leaving /Cr/ clusters at the end, e.g., Latin nigrum '(shiny) black' > *[ˈneɡro] > Old French neɡre /ˈneɡrə/ 'black' (thus avoiding the impermissible /neɡr/, cf. carrum > char 'cart').

==== Middle of word ====
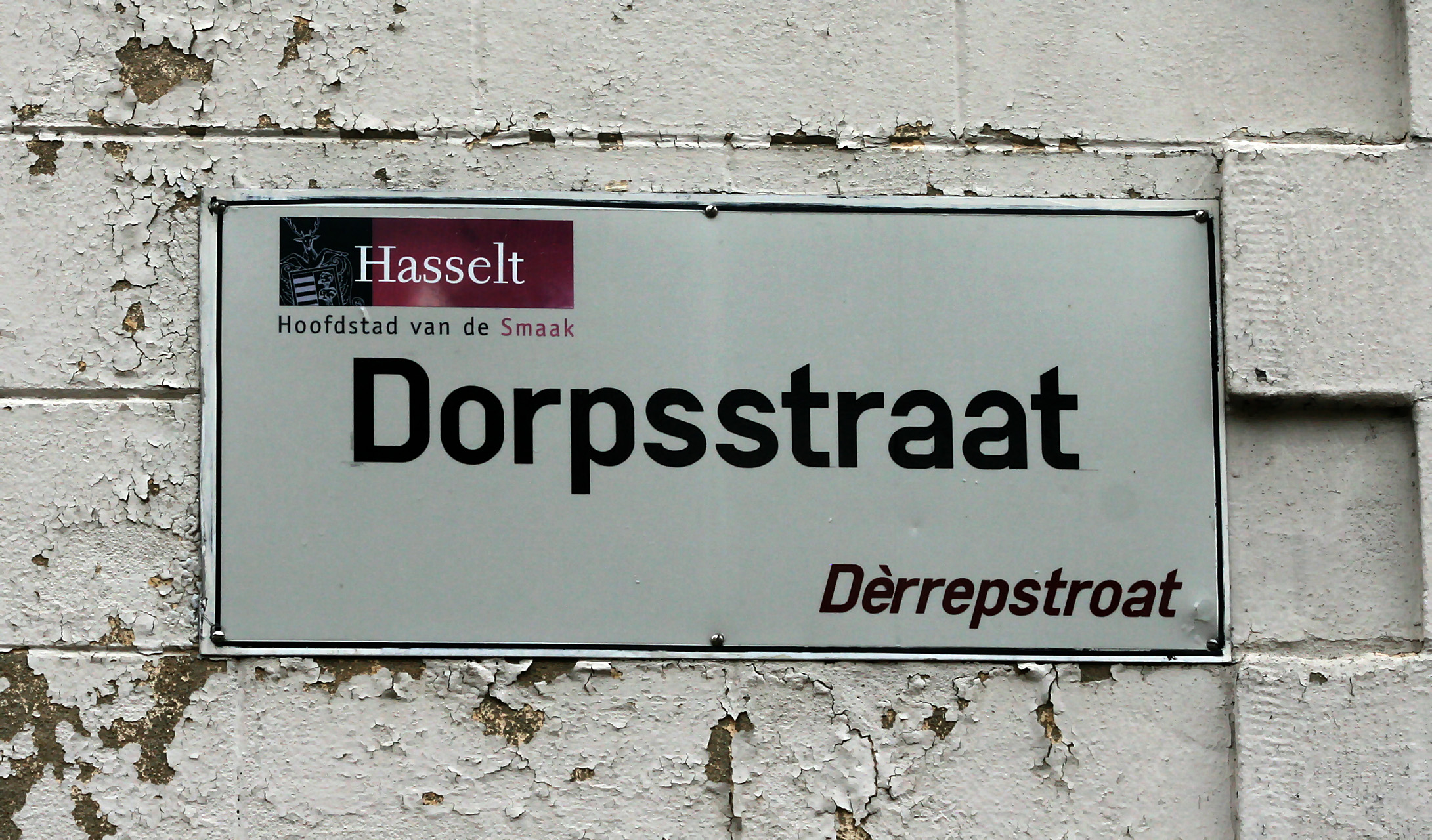
Anaptyxis in the Hasselt dialect word dèrrepstroat 'village street' shown below the Standard Dutch form dorpsstraat, spelled etymologically but pronounced with [-rəp-] by many speakers, including those from Hasselt.

Similarly as above, a vowel may be inserted in the middle of a word to resolve an impermissible word-final consonant cluster. An example of this can be found in Lebanese Arabic, where /ˈʔaləb/ 'heart' corresponds to Modern Standard Arabic قلب /qalb/ and Egyptian Arabic /ʔælb/. In the development of Old English, Proto-Germanic *akraz 'field, acre' would have ended up with an impermissible /kr/ final cluster (*æcr), so it was resolved by inserting an /e/ before the rhotic consonant: æcer (cf. the use of a syllabic consonant in Gothic akrs).

Vowel insertion in the middle of a word can be observed in the history of the Slavic languages, which had a preference for open syllables in medieval times. An example of this is the Proto-Slavic form *gordŭ 'town', in which the East Slavic languages inserted an epenthetic copy vowel to open the closed syllable, resulting in городъ (gorodŭ), which became город (gorod) in modern Russian. Other Slavic languages used metathesis for the vowel and the syllable-final consonant, producing *grodŭ in this case, as seen in Polish gród, Old Church Slavonic градъ gradŭ, Serbo-Croatian grad and Czech hrad.

In many West Germanic language varieties (such as Dutch (including local Brabantian and Hollandic dialects), Limburgish, Luxembourgish and Ripuarian), a phonetic [ə] is inserted between /l/ or /r/ and labial or velar /m, p, k, f, x/ (also /n/, in the case of the preceding /r/). This leads to Dutch kalm 'calm' being pronounced [ˈkɑləm], Limburgish sjolk 'apron' being pronounced [ˈʃɔlək], Luxembourgish Vollek 'people' being pronounced [ˈfolək] (from Old High German folc, a monosyllable) and Ripuarian Dörp 'village' being pronounced [ˈdœʁəp]. The city names Bergen op Zoom and Utrecht as pronounced by locals can be spelled Berrege and Utereg in eye dialect. The exact details vary depending on the language and dialect, with some dialects (such as many dialects of Limburgish) permitting the addition across syllable boundaries (but not morpheme boundaries) and others restricting it to the syllable coda (such as Standard Dutch). This unetymological schwa is never written in Standard Dutch, but is usually written in Luxembourgish. In Limburgish and Ripuarian, the practices vary as there is not one standard orthography.

Anaptyxis of the schwa in Dutch
| Phonemic sequence | In closed syllables (standard) | Across syllable boundaries (dialectal) |
|---|---|---|
| /lm/ | kalm [ˈkɑləm] 'calm' | kalmer [ˈkɑləmər] 'calmer' |
| /lp/ | alp [ˈɑləp] 'alp' | alpen [ˈɑləpə(n)] 'alps' |
| /lk/ | balk [ˈbɑlək] 'beam' | balken [ˈbɑləkə(n)] 'beams' |
| /lf ~ lv/ | kalf [ˈkɑləf] 'calf' | kalven [ˈkɑləvə(n)] 'calves' |
| /lx/ (Northern) | balg [ˈbɑləx] 'leather bag' | balgen [ˈbɑləxə(n)] 'leather bags' |
| /lx ~ lɣ/ (Southern) | balg [ˈbɑləx] 'leather bag' | balgen [ˈbɑləɣə(n)] 'leather bags' |
| /rm/ | darm [ˈdɑrəm] 'intestine' | darmen [ˈdɑrəmə(n)] 'intestines' |
| /rp/ | harp [ˈɦɑrəp] 'harp' | harpen [ˈɦɑrəpə(n)] 'harps' |
| /rk/ | park [ˈpɑrək] 'park' | parken [ˈpɑrəkə(n)] 'parks' |
| /rf ~ rv/ | kerf [ˈkɛrəf] 'carve' | kerven [ˈkɛrəvə(n)] 'carves' |
| /rx/ (Northern) | berg [ˈbɛrəx] 'mountain' | bergen [ˈbɛrəxə(n)] 'mountains' |
| /rx ~ rɣ/ (Southern) | berg [ˈbɛrəx] 'mountain' | bergen [ˈbɛrəɣə(n)] 'mountains' |
| /rn/ | kern [ˈkɛrən] 'nucleus' | kernen [ˈkɛrənə(n)] 'nuclei' |

Dialects with both types of anaptyxis regularize the schwa-insertion, making it phonemic: /ˈkɑləm/, /ˈkɑləmər/, etc. comparably to the GOAT split in London English (except that no new phoneme is created, as /ə/ already exists in Dutch as a phoneme). In those dialects, schwa insertion also occurs between /l/ or /r/ on the one hand and /v/ or /ɣ/ on the other. Most speakers with a hard G do not have /ɣ/ as a phoneme in their system; thus, broad Amsterdam and Utrecht pronunciations of balgen and bergen are /ˈbɑləxə/, /ˈbɛrəxə/, with no change in the voicing of the fricative. /ˈbɑləɣə/ and /ˈbɛrəɣə/ are markedly southern (Brabantian/Limburgish-influenced) dialectal pronunciations. Anaptyxis does not occur across morpheme boundaries, so that while the surname Voorn can be pronounced [ˈvoːrən], the noun/verb voornemen [ˈvoːrˌneːmə(n)] 'intention', 'to intend' is never pronounced *[ˈvoːrəˌneːmə(n)].

In Irish and Scottish English (also West Germanic varieties), anaptyxis famously occurs in words such as 'film' [ˈfɪləm], spelled 'fillum' in eye dialect.

Another environment can be observed in the history of Modern Persian, in which former word-initial consonant clusters, which were still extant in Middle Persian, are regularly broken up: Middle Persian brādar 'brother' > modern Iranian Persian برادر barādar /bærɑˈdær/, Middle Persian stūn 'column' > Early New Persian ستون sutūn > modern Iranian Persian ستون sotun /soˈtun/.

In Spanish, as a phonetic detail, it is usual to find a schwa vowel in sequences of a consonant followed by a flap. For instance, vinagre 'vinegar' may be [biˈnaɣɾe] but also [biˈnaɣᵊɾe].

Many Indo-Aryan languages carry an inherent vowel after each consonant. For example, in Assamese, the inherent vowel is "o" (অ), while in Hindi and Marathi, it is "a" (अ). Sanskrit words like maaŋsa ('meat', মাংস), ratna ('jewel', ৰত্ন), yatna ('effort', যত্ন), padma ('lotus', পদ্ম), harsha ('joy', হৰ্ষ), dvaara ('door', দ্বাৰ) etc. become moŋoh (মাংস > মঙহ), roton (ৰত্ন > ৰতন), zoton (যত্ন > যতন), podum (পদ্ম > পদুম), horix (হৰ্ষ > হৰিষ), duwar (দ্বাৰ > দুৱাৰ) etc. in Assamese. Other, non-Tatsama words also undergo anaptyxis, for example, the English word glass becomes gilas (গিলাছ).

==== Beginning of word ====
In the Western Romance languages, a prothetic vowel was inserted at the beginning of any word that began with /s/ and another consonant, e.g. Latin spatha 'two-edged sword, typically used by cavalry' becomes the normal word for 'sword' in Romance languages with an inserted /e/: Spanish/Portuguese espada, Catalan espasa, Old French espede > modern épée (see also espadon 'swordfish').

French in fact presents three layers in the vocabulary in which initial vowel epenthesis is or is not applied, depending on the time a word came into the language:

- insertion of epenthetic /e/ in inherited and commonly used learned and semi-learned words, which then drop the following /s/ after the medieval period: Latin stēlla, stēla > Old French esteile > modern étoile 'star', studium > Old French estude > modern étude 'study', schola > OF escole > modern école 'school'
- insertion of /e/ and keeping /s/ in learned words borrowed during the Middle Ages or the Renaissance: speciēs > espèce, spatium > espace
- then in the modern period, /e/ is not inserted and uncommon old learned borrowings are remolded to look more like Latin: scholāris > scolaire, spatiālis > spatial, speciālis > learned Old French especiel > remolded to modern spécial

Similarly, at some point in the Proto-Armenian language and Classical Armenian, the prothetic vowel ե was placed at the beginning of the word before the sound ր, leading to words like երախ ('animal mouth', erax) from Iranian rax ('animal mouth'), or երազ ('dream', eraz) from Iranian raz ('mystery').

=== Grammatical rule ===
Epenthesis often breaks up a consonant cluster or vowel sequence that is not permitted by the phonotactics of a language. Regular or semi-regular epenthesis commonly occurs in languages with affixes. For example, a reduced vowel /ɪ/ or /ə/ (here abbreviated as /ᵻ/) is inserted before the English plural suffix -/z/ and the past tense suffix -/d/ when the root ends in a similar consonant: glass → glasses /ˈɡlæsᵻz/ or /ˈɡlɑːsᵻz/; bat → batted /ˈbætᵻd/. However, this is a synchronic analysis as the vowel was originally present in the suffix but has been lost in most words.

=== Borrowed words ===
Vocalic epenthesis typically occurs when words are borrowed from a language that has consonant clusters or syllable codas that are not permitted in the borrowing language.

Languages use various vowels, but schwa is quite common when it is available:

- Hebrew uses a single vowel, the schwa (pronounced /ɛ/ in Israeli Hebrew).
- Japanese generally uses /ɯ/ except after /t/ and /d/, when it uses /o/, and after /h/, when it uses an echo vowel. For example, English cap becomes キャップ /kjappɯ/ in Japanese; English street, ストリート /sɯtoɺiːto/; the Dutch name Gogh, ゴッホ /ɡohho/; and the German name Bach, バッハ /bahha/.
- Korean uses /ɯ/ in most cases. /i/ is used after borrowed /ʃ/, /ʒ/, /tʃ/, /dʒ/, or /ç/, although /u/ may also be used after borrowed /ʃ/ depending on the source language. /u/ is used when /ʃ/ is followed by a consonant or when a syllable ends with /ɲ/. For example, English strike becomes 스트라이크 /sɯ.tʰɯ.ɾa.i.kʰɯ/, with three epenthetic /ɯ/ vowels and a split of English diphthong /aɪ/ into two syllables.
- Brazilian Portuguese uses /i/, which, in most dialects, triggers palatalization of a preceding /t/ or /d/: nerd > /ˈnɛʁdʒi/; stress > /isˈtɾɛsi/; McDonald's > /mɛkiˈdonawdʒis/ with normal vocalization of /l/ to /w/. Most speakers pronounce borrowings with spelling pronunciations, and others try to approximate the nearest equivalents in Portuguese of the phonemes in the original language. The word stress became estresse as in the example above.
- Classical Arabic does not allow clusters at the beginning of a word, and typically uses /i/ to break up such clusters in borrowings: Latin strāta > صِرَاط /sˤiraːtˤ/ 'street'. In Modern Standard Arabic and Egyptian Arabic, copy vowels are often used as well, e.g. English/French klaxon (car horn) > Egyptian Arabic كلكس /kæˈlæks/ 'car horn', but note French blouse > Egyptian Arabic بلوزة /beˈluːzæ/ (where /e/ corresponds to Modern Standard Arabic /i/). Many other modern varieties such as North Levantine Arabic and Moroccan Arabic allow word-initial clusters, however.
- Persian also does not allow clusters at the beginning of a word and typically uses /æ/ to break up such clusters in borrowings except between /s/ and /t/, when /o/ is added.
- Spanish does not allow clusters at the beginning of a word with an /s/ in them and adds e- to such words: Latin species > especie, English stress > estrés.
- Turkish prefixes close vowels to loanwords with initial clusters of alveolar fricatives followed by another consonant: Isparta < Greek Σπάρτη (Sparti), setuskur < set screw, uskumru < Greek σκουμπρί (skoúmbri), Üsküdar < Byzantine Greek Σκουτάριον (Skoutárion), istimbot < steamboat, İskoçya < Scotland, istavrit < Greek σταυροειδής (stavroïdís), İzmir < Greek Σμύρνη (Zmírni). The practice is no longer productive as of late 20th century and a few such words have changed back: spor < ıspor < French sport.

=== Informal speech ===
Epenthesis most often occurs within unfamiliar or complex consonant clusters. For example, in English, the name Dwight is commonly pronounced with an epenthetic schwa between the /d/ and the /w/ ([dəˈwaɪt]), and many speakers insert a schwa between the /l/ and /t/ of realtor. Irish English and Scottish English are some of the dialects that may insert a schwa between /l/ and /m/ in words like film ([ˈfɪləm]) under the influence of Celtic languages, a phenomenon that also occurs in Indian English due to the influence of Indo-Aryan languages like Hindi.

Epenthesis is sometimes used for humorous or childlike effect. For example, the cartoon character Yogi Bear says "pic-a-nic basket" for picnic basket. Another example is found in the chants of England football fans in which England is usually rendered as [ˈɪŋɡələnd] or the pronunciation of athlete as "ath-e-lete". Some apparent occurrences of epenthesis, however, have a separate cause: the pronunciation of nuclear as nucular (/ˈn(j)ukjəlɚ/) in some North American dialects arises out of analogy with other -cular words (binocular, particular, etc.) rather than from epenthesis.

In colloquial registers of Brazilian Portuguese, [i] is sometimes inserted between consonant clusters except those with /l/ (atleta), /ɾ/ (prato) or syllable-ending /s/ (pasta; note syllable-final /s/ is pronounced [ʃ] in a number of dialects). Examples would be tsunami /tʃisuˈnami/, advogado /adʒivoˈɡadu/ and abdômen [abiˈdomẽj]. Some dialects also use [e], which is deemed as stereotypical of people from lower classes, such as those arriving from rural flight in internal migrations to cities such as Rio de Janeiro, Brasília and São Paulo.

=== In Finnish ===
In Finnish, there are two epenthetic vowels and two nativization vowels. One epenthetic vowel is the preceding vowel, found in the illative case ending -(h)*n: maa → maahan, talo → taloon. The second is [e], connecting stems that have historically been consonant stems to their case endings: nim+n → nimen.

In Standard Finnish, consonant clusters may not be broken by epenthetic vowels; foreign words undergo consonant deletion rather than addition of vowels: ranta ('shore') from Proto-Germanic *strandō. However, modern loans may not end in consonants. Even if the word, such as a personal name, is native, a paragogic vowel is needed to connect a consonantal case ending to the word. The vowel is /i/: (Inter)net → netti, or in the case of personal name, Bush + -sta → Bushista 'about Bush' (elative case).

Finnish has moraic consonants: l, h and n are of interest. In Standard Finnish, they are slightly intensified before a consonant in a medial cluster: -hj-. Some dialects, like Savo and Ostrobothnian, have epenthesis instead and use the preceding vowel in clusters of type -lC- and -hC-, in Savo also -nh-. (In Finnish linguistics, the phenomenon is often referred to as švaa; the same word can also mean 'schwa', but it is not a phoneme in Finnish so there is usually no danger of confusion.)

For example, Pohjanmaa 'Ostrobothnia' → Pohojammaa, ryhmä → ryhymä, and Savo vanha → vanaha. Ambiguities may result: salmi 'strait' vs. salami. (An exception is that in Pohjanmaa, -lj- and -rj- become -li- and -ri-, respectively: kirja → kiria. Also, in a small region in Savo, /e/ is used instead.)

=== In constructed languages ===
Lojban, a constructed language that seeks logically-oriented grammatical and phonological structures, uses a number of consonant clusters in its words. Since it is designed to be as universal as possible, it allows a type of anaptyxis called "buffering" to be used if a speaker finds a cluster difficult or impossible to pronounce. A vowel sound that is nonexistent in Lojban (usually /ɪ/ as in 'hit') is added between two consonants to make the word easier to pronounce. Despite altering the phonetics of a word, the use of buffering is completely ignored by grammar. Also, the vowel sound used must not be confused with any existing Lojban vowel.

An example of buffering in Lojban is that if a speaker finds the cluster [ml] in the word mlatu ('cat') (pronounced ['mlatu]) hard or impossible to pronounce, the vowel [ɐ] can be pronounced between the two consonants, resulting in the form [mɐˈlatu]. Nothing changes grammatically, including the word's spelling and the syllabication.

== In sign language ==
A type of epenthesis in sign language is known as "movement epenthesis" and occurs, most commonly, during the boundary between signs while the hands move from the posture required by the first sign to that required by the next.

== Related phenomena ==
- Infixation: the insertion of a morpheme within a word
- Metathesis: the reordering of sounds within a word
- Paragoge: the addition of a sound to the end of a word
- Prothesis: the addition of a sound to the beginning of a word
- Tmesis: the inclusion of a whole word within another one

== See also ==
- Assibilation
- Assimilation
- Coarticulation (Co-articulated consonant, Secondary articulation)
- Consonant harmony
- Crasis
- Dissimilation
- Labialisation
- Language game
- Lenition
- Metathesis
- Palatalization
- Pharyngealisation
- Sandhi
- Velarization
- Vowel harmony

== General and cited sources ==
- Crowley, Terry (1997). An Introduction to Historical Linguistics (3rd ed.). Oxford University Press. ISBN 978-0-19-558378-6.
- Labrune, Laurence (2012). The Phonology of Japanese. The Phonology of the World's Languages. Oxford University Press. ISBN 978-0-19-954583-4.
