= Prenasalized consonant =

Type of articulation

Prenasalized consonants are phonetic sequences of a nasal and an obstruent (or occasionally a non-nasal sonorant) that behave phonologically like single consonants. When unambiguous, prenasalized consonants may simply be transcribed e.g. ⟨mb⟩. In the IPA, a tie bar may be used to specify that these are single segments, as in ⟨m͡b⟩ or ⟨m͜b⟩. The tie bar is commonly omitted. Another common transcription practice is to make the nasal superscript: ⟨ᵐb⟩, especially when it is phonetically distinct from a nasal-stop sequence. An old convention of the IPA was to mark the nasal as 'short' until the short and the nonsyllabic signs diverged, as in ⟨m̆b⟩.

The primary reason for considering these to be single consonants, rather than clusters as in English finger or member, lies in their behavior; however, there may also be phonetic correlates which distinguish prenasalized consonants from clusters. Because of the additional difficulty in both articulation and timing, prenasalized fricatives and sonorants are not as common as prenasalized stops or affricates, and the presence of the former implies the latter. Only three languages (Sinhala, Fula, Selayarese) have been reported to have a contrast between prenasalized consonants (N͜C) and their corresponding clusters (NC).

In most languages, when a prenasalized consonant is described as "voiceless", it is only the oral portion that is voiceless, and the nasal portion is modally voiced. Thus, a language may have "voiced" [mb nd ɳɖ ɲɟ ŋɡ ɴɢ] and "voiceless" [mp nt ɳʈ ɲc ŋk ɴq]. However, in some Southern Min (including Taiwanese) dialects, voiced consonants are preceded by voiceless prenasalization: [m̥b n̥d n̥ɺ ŋ̊ɡ]. Yeyi has prenasalized ejectives and clicks like /ntsʼ, ŋkʼ, ŋᵏ!ʰ, ŋᶢ!/. Nizaa has prenasalized implosives like /mɓ, nɗ/. Adzera has a /nʔ/.

Prenasalized stops may be distinguished from post-oralized or post-stopped nasals (orally released nasals), such as the [mᵇ nᵈ ɲᶡ ŋᶢ] of Acehnese and similar sounds (including voiceless [mᵖ]) in many dialects of Chinese. (At least in the Chinese case, nasalization, in some dialects, continues in a reduced degree to the vowel, indicating that the consonant is partially denasalized, rather than actually having an oral release.) No language is believed to contrast the two types of consonant, which are distinguished primarily by a difference in timing (a brief nasal followed by longer stop, as opposed to a longer nasal followed by brief stop).

== Geographic distribution ==
=== Africa ===
The Bantu languages are famous for their prenasalized stops (the "nt" in "Bantu" is an example; see also North Teke), but similar sounds occur across Africa. Ghana's politician Kwame Nkrumah had a prenasalized stop in his name, as does the capital of Chad, N'Djamena (African prenasalized stops are often written with apostrophes in Latin script transcription although this may sometimes indicate syllabic nasals instead). The sound [^{ŋ͡m}g͡b] can also be found in approximately 90 languages in Africa.

=== East Asia ===
In Southern Min languages, such as Teochew, prenasalized stops are also found. The prenasalized stops in the vernacular readings of Southern Min languages evolved not from the different Middle Chinese initials and thus are historically different from the voiced obstruents found in Wu and Xiang languages.

Prenasalized consonants are widely utilized in the Loloish languages of the Lolo–Burmese family, such as Yi and Naxi. The following table illustrates the prenasalized consonants in northern Yi.

Prenasalized consonants in Northern Yi
Yi Character	Official Pinyin	IPA	Meaning
ꂃ	nbo	[mbo˧]	skirt
ꅝ	ndo	[ndo˧]	drink
ꈾ	mge	[ŋɡɤ˧]	buckwheat
ꌅ	nzy	[nd͡zz̩˧]	control
ꎧ	nry	[nɖ͡ʐʐ̩˧]	wine, liquor
ꐳ	nji	[nd͡ʑʑ̩˧]	quick, fast

The prenasalized stops also occur in several branches of the Hmong–Mien language family of Southern China and Southeast Asia.

For conservative speakers of Japanese Tohoku dialects, standard voiced stops are prenasalized and voiceless stops are voiced intervocalically. This also applies to stops voiced through rendaku. Prenasalized stops are also reconstructed for Old Japanese.

=== Europe ===
In Greek and Tsakonian the orthographic sequences μπ, ντ γκ and γγ are often pronounced as prenasalized voiced stops [ᵐb], [ⁿd], and [ᵑɡ], respectively, especially in formal speech and among older speakers. Among younger Athenian speakers the prenasalization often disappears and in fast speech the voiced stop may be replaced by a fricative.

=== South America ===
The Guarani language has a set of prenasalized stops which are alternate allophonically with simple nasal continuants; they appear within or at the beginning of a word, to the left of a stressed vowel that is oral.

=== South Asia ===
The Indo-Aryan languages Sinhala and Dhivehi have prenasalized stops. Sinhala script has prenasalized versions of /g/, /ʥ/, /ɖ/, /d̪/ and /b/. Sinhala is one of only three languages reported to have a contrast between prenasalized consonants and their corresponding clusters, along with Fula and Selayarese, although the nature of this contrast is debated. For example,

Four-way contrast in Sinhala
Sinhala script	IPA	ISO 15919	Translation
කද	[ka.d̪ə]	kada	shoulder pole
කන	[ka.nə]	kana	ear
කඳ	[ka.ⁿd̪ə]	kan̆da	trunk
කන්ද	[kan̪.d̪ə]	kanda	hill

A prenasalized consonant [ᵐb] in Sri Lanka Malay ga.mbar has a shorter nasal segment and a longer preceding vowel

An [mb] cluster in Sri Lanka Malay sam.bal has a longer nasal and a shorter preceding vowel

Sri Lankan Malay has been in contact with Sinhala a long time and has also developed prenasalized stops. The spectrograms on the right show the word gambar with a prenasalized stop and the word sambal with a sequence of nasal+voiced stop, yet not prenasalized. The difference in the length of the [m] part is clearly visible. The nasal in the prenasalized word is much shorter than the nasal in the other word.

This phonetic information is complemented by phonological evidence: The first vowel in gaambar is lengthened, which only happens in open syllables in Sri Lanka Malay. The syllabification of gambar must be ga.mbar then, and the syllabification of sambal sam.bal.

=== Oceania ===
An example of the unitary behavior of prenasalized stops is provided by Fijian. In this language, as in many in Melanesia and also reconstructed for Proto-Oceanic, there is a series of voiceless stops, [p, t, k], and a series of prenasalized stops, [mb, nd, ŋɡ], but there are no simple voiced stops, [b, d, ɡ]. In addition, Fijian allows prenasalized stops at the beginning of a word, but it does not allow other consonant sequences. Thus the prenasalized stops behave like ordinary consonants. In some Oceanic languages, prenasalisation of voiced consonants depends on the environment. For example, in Raga, b and d are prenasalized when the preceding consonant is nasal (nonda "ours"), but not elsewhere (gida "us"). Uneapa has prenasalization word-medially, but not word-initially (gombu "yam").

When Tok Pisin is spoken by people in Papua New Guinea who have similar phonologies in their languages, voiced consonants are prenasalized. For example, the preposition bilong (from English belong) is pronounced [ᵐbiloŋ] by many Melanesians. The prenasalization behaves as a phonetic detail of voicing, rather than a separate segment.

=== Australia ===
Prenasalized stops are also found in Australia. The Eastern Arrernte language has both prenasalized stops and prestopped nasals, but does not have any other word-initial consonant clusters. Compare [mʷarə] "good", [mpʷaɻə] "make", [pmʷaɻə] "coolamon".

== History of study ==
Prenasalized stops have been documented as speech sounds as far back as 1595. The Jesuit missionary and scholar Joseph of Anchieta describes their existence in the Tupi language of Brazil in his grammar of Tupi:

nunqua se pronuncia B. in principio dictionis sem m. & posto que por jicuria se escreuesse sem m. sempre se lhe ha de prepor, vt pró Baê, dizse, Mbaê, porque precedente o genitiuo, ou adiectiuo não he soffriuel pronunciarse sem m. ("...B is never pronounced at the beginning of a word without m; and although, because of the language's orthography, it may be written without m, m must always be prefixed to it. Thus, instead of Baê, one says Mbaê, because after a preceding genitive or adjective it is impossible to pronounce it without m.")

== See also ==
- Preploded nasal
- List of Latin digraphs#M

== Sources ==
- Silverman, Daniel (1995), "Optional, conditional, and obligatory prenasalization in Bafanji", Journal of West African Languages, 25: 57–62
