= Paragoge =

Adding sounds to the end of a word

Paragoge (/ˌpærəˈɡoʊdʒi/) is the addition of a sound to the end of a word. It is a type of epenthesis.

Paragoge is most often linked with the nativization of loanwords. It is particularly common in Brazilian Portuguese, not only in loanwords but also in word derivation. It is also present in the accents of many Brazilians while speaking foreign languages such as English.

Some languages have undergone paragoge as a sound change, and modern forms are longer than the historical forms they are derived from. Italian sono 'I am', from Latin sum, is an example. Sometimes, as above, the paragogic vowel is an echo vowel, such as Proto-Oceanic *saqat "bad" > Uneapa zaɣata.

== Etymology ==
The word paragoge is taken from Ancient Greek: παραγωγή 'deviation; language alteration': from παρα- prefix para- 'beside' and ἀγωγή agogē 'bringing in'.

== In loanwords ==
Some languages add a sound to the end of a loanword when it would otherwise end in a forbidden sound. Some languages add a grammatical ending to the end of a loanword to make it declinable.

=== Examples ===
- English rack → Finnish räkki;
- English gal → Japanese ギャル (gyaru);
- English golf → Portuguese golfe

==== Grammatical endings ====
- English computer → Latvian kompjūters;
- Ottoman Turkish راقى (rakı) > South Slavic rakia;
- English chips → Polish chipsy (alt. czipsy) — the -y is added to make it a regular plural in Polish due to declension (the word turns into double plural);
- Polish pierogi (pl.) → English pierogis — the -s is added to indicate plurality, due to the common misconception that pierogi is a singular form (double plural).

== In inherited words ==
Paragoge can occur in the inherited words of a language as well. This is the case with many words in Romance languages and Austronesian languages.

=== Examples ===
- Latin sunt → Italian sono
- Latin fine → Catalan fins
- Proto-Oceanic *saqat "bad" → *saqati → Tamambo sati
- Proto-Malayo-Polynesian *bayaD "pay" → Proto-South Sulawesi *bayar → Makassarese báyaraʔ
- Proto-Austronesian *bəsuʀ "satiated" → Proto-Malayo-Polynesian *bəsuʀ→ Proto-South Sulawesi *bəssuʀ → Makassarese bássoroʔ

== Sources ==
- Crowley, Terry (1997): An Introduction to Historical Linguistics. 3rd edition. Oxford University Press.
- Sorbet, Piotr (2019): "El mecanismo de paragoge". In: LÓPEZ GONZÁLEZ, Antonio María, KOBYŁECKA-PIWOŃSKA, Ewa, KŁOSIŃSKA-NACHIN, Agnieszka, BARAN, Marek (eds.): Voces dialogantes, Wydawnictwo Uniwersytetu Łódzkiego, 375-384.
