= Makassarese language =

Austronesian language of South Sulawesi, Indonesia

Makasarese
- Makasar, Makassar, Macassar, Macassan
- Basa Mangkasaraʼ ᨅᨔ ᨆᨀᨔᨑ 𑻤𑻰𑻥𑻠𑻰𑻭 بَاسَ مَڠْكَاسَرَءْ
- Mangkasaraʼ written in Makasar script (up) and Lontara script (down)
- Pronunciation: [ɓasa mãŋˈkʰasaraʔ]
- Native to: Indonesia
- Region: South Sulawesi (Sulawesi)
- Ethnicity: Makassarese
- Native speakers: (2.1 million cited 2000 census)
- Language family: Austronesian: Malayo-Polynesian; South Sulawesi; Makassaric; Makasarese
- Dialects: Gowa; Turatea; Maros-Pangkep
- Writing system: Latin script (Makassarese Latin alphabet) (present); Lontara script (present); Serang script (Makassar Annals, religious purpose); Makasar script (historical)

Official status
- Regulated by: Badan Pengembangan dan Pembinaan Bahasa

Language codes
- ISO 639-2: mak
- ISO 639-3: mak
- Glottolog: maka1311
- Makassarese language Other Makassaric languages

Makassarese (/məˌkæsəˈriːz/ mə-KASS-ər-EEZ; Basa Mangkasaraʼ, Lontara script: ᨅᨔ ᨆᨀᨔᨑ, Makasar script: 𑻤𑻰𑻥𑻠𑻰𑻭, Serang script: بَاسَ مَڠْكَاسَرَءْ, pronounced [ɓasa mãŋˈkʰasaraʔ]), sometimes called Makasar, Makassar, Macassar, or Macassan (Australian English) is a language of the Makassarese people, spoken in South Sulawesi province of Indonesia. It is a member of the South Sulawesi group of the Austronesian language family, and thus closely related to, among others, Buginese, also known as Bugis. The areas where Makassarese is spoken include the Gowa, Sinjai, Maros, Takalar, Jeneponto, Bantaeng, Pangkajene and Islands, Bulukumba, and Selayar Islands Regencies, and Makassar. Within the Austronesian language family, Makassarese is part of the South Sulawesi language group, although its vocabulary is considered divergent compared to its closest relatives. In 2000, Makassarese had approximately 2.1 million native speakers.

== Classification ==
Makassarese is an Austronesian language from the South Sulawesi branch of the Malayo-Polynesian subfamily, specifically the Makassaric group, which also includes both Highland and Coastal Konjo languages and the Selayar language. The Konjo and Selayar language varieties are sometimes considered dialects of Makassarese. As part of the South Sulawesi language family, Makassarese is also closely related to the Bugis, Mandar, and Toraja-Saʼdan languages.

In terms of vocabulary, Makassarese is considered the most distinct among the South Sulawesi languages. The average percentage of vocabulary similarity between Makassarese and other South Sulawesi languages is only 43%. Specifically, the Gowa or Lakiung dialect is the most divergent; the vocabulary similarity of this dialect with other South Sulawesi languages is about 5–10 percentage points lower compared to the vocabulary similarity of Konjo and Selayar with other South Sulawesi languages. However, etymostatistical analysis and functor statistics conducted by linguist Ülo Sirk shows a higher vocabulary similarity percentage (≥ 60%) between Makassarese and other South Sulawesi languages. These quantitative findings support qualitative analyses that place Makassarese as part of the South Sulawesi language family.

=== Dialect ===
A diagram representing the lexical similarity between various languages/dialects within the Makassar/Makassarik subgroup, based on Grimes & Grimes (1987, data from Kaseng 1978) and Jukes (2006).

The language varieties within the Makassaric group form a dialect continuum. A language survey in South Sulawesi conducted by linguists and anthropologists Charles and Barbara Grimes separated the Konjo and Selayar languages from Makassarese. Meanwhile, a subsequent survey by linguists Timothy Friberg and Thomas Laskowske divided the Konjo language into three varieties: Coastal Konjo, Highland Konjo, and Bentong/Dentong. However, in a book on Makassarese grammar published by the Center for Language Development and Cultivation, local linguist Abdul Kadir Manyambeang and his team include the Konjo and Selayar varieties as dialects of Makassarese.

Excluding the Konjo and Selayar varieties, Makassarese can be divided into at least three dialects: the Gowa or Lakiung dialect, the Jeneponto or Turatea dialect, and the Bantaeng dialect. The main differences among these varieties within the Makassar group lie in vocabulary; their grammatical structures are generally quite similar. Speakers of the Gowa dialect tend to switch to Indonesian when communicating with speakers of the Bantaeng dialect or with speakers of the Konjo and Selayar languages, and vice versa. The Gowa dialect is generally considered the prestige variety of Makassarese. As the dialect spoken in the central region, the Gowa dialect is also commonly used by speakers of other varieties within the Makassaric group.

== Distribution ==
According to a demographic study based on the 2010 census data, about 1.87 million Indonesians over the age of five speak Makassarese as their mother tongue. Makassarese ranks 16th of top 20 local languages with the most speakers in Indonesia. Makassarese is also the second most-spoken language in Sulawesi after Bugis, which has over 3.5 million speakers.

The Makassarese language is primarily spoken by the Makassar people, although a small percentage (1.89%) of the Bugis people also use it as their mother tongue. Makassarese speakers are concentrated in the southwestern peninsula of South Sulawesi, particularly in the fertile coastal areas around Makassar, Gowa Regency, and Takalar Regency. The language is also spoken by some residents of Maros Regency and Pangkajene and Islands Regency to the north, alongside Bugis. Residents of Jeneponto and Bantaeng Regencies generally identify themselves as part of the Makassarese-speaking community, although the varieties they speak (the Jeneponto or Turatea dialect and the Bantaeng dialect) differ significantly from the dialects used in Gowa and Takalar. The closely related Konjo language is spoken in the mountainous areas of Gowa and along the coast of Bulukumba Regency, while the Selayar language is spoken on Selayar Island, to the south of the peninsula.

Due to Makassarese contact with Aboriginal peoples in Northern Australia, a pidgin of Makassarese was used as lingua franca across the region between different Aboriginal groups, though its use declined starting in the early 20th century due to Australian restrictions against Makassarese fishermen in the region and was supplanted by English as a lingua franca.

== Current status ==
Makassarese is one of the relatively well-developed regional languages in Indonesia. It is still widely used in rural areas and parts of Makassar city. Makassarese is also considered important as a marker of ethnic identity. However, in urban communities, code-switching or code-mixing between Makassar and Indonesian is commonly used. Some urban Makassar residents, especially those from the middle class or with multiethnic backgrounds, also use Indonesian as the primary language in their households. Ethnologue classifies Makassar as a 6b (Threatened) language on the EGIDS scale, indicating that although the language is still commonly used in daily conversations, the natural intergenerational transmission or teaching of the language is beginning to be disrupted.

== Phonology ==
Linguist Anthony Jukes described Makassarese phonology as follows:

=== Vowels ===
Makassarese has five vowels: /a/, /e/, /i/, /o/, /u/. The mid vowels are lowered to [ɛ] and [ɔ] in absolute final position and in the vowel sequences /ea/ and /oa/.

Makassarese vowels
	Front	Central	Back
Close	i		u
Mid	e		o
Open		a	

The vowel phoneme /e/ tends to be realized as the open-mid vowel [ɛ] when it is at the end of a word or before a syllable containing the sound [ɛ]. Compare, for instance, the pronunciation of /e/ in the word leʼbaʼ [ˈleʔ.baʔ] 'already' with mange [ˈma.ŋɛ] 'go to'. The phoneme /o/ also has an open-mid allophone [ɔ] when it is at the end of a word or precedes a syllable containing the sound [ɔ], as seen in the word lompo [ˈlɔ̃m.pɔ] 'big' (compare with órasaʼ [ˈo.ra.saʔ] 'heavy'). Regardless of their position within a word, some speakers tend to pronounce these two vowels with a higher (closer) tongue position, making their pronunciation approach that of the phonemes /i/ and /u/.

Vowels can be pronounced nasally when they are around nasal consonants within the same syllable. There are two levels of nasalization intensity for vowels: strong nasalization and weak nasalization. Weak nasalization can be found on vowels before nasal consonants that are not at the end of a word. Strong nasalization can be found on vowels before final nasal consonants or generally after nasal consonants. Nasalization can spread to vowels in syllables after nasal vowels if there are no consonants blocking it. However, the intensity of nasalization in vowels like this is not as strong as in the vowels before them, as in the pronunciation of the word niaʼ [ni͌.ãʔ] 'there is'.

=== Consonants ===
There are 17 consonants in Makassarese, as outlined in the following table.

Makassarese consonants
		Labial	Alveolar	Palatal	Velar	Glottal
Nasal		m	n	ɲ ⟨ny⟩ (Note: also written as ⟨n⟩ before ⟨c⟩ and ⟨j⟩)	ŋ ⟨ng⟩	
Plosive	voiceless	p	t	c	k	ʔ ⟨ʼ⟩ (Note: The glottal stop only occurs in syllable-final position. It is written as ⟨k⟩ in the orthography promoted as the standard by the government and based on the practice in Indonesian, as an apostrophe ⟨ʼ⟩ in other orthographic standards, sometimes as ⟨q⟩ in academic writing, or not written at all in informal writing.)
Plosive	voiced	b	d	ɟ ⟨j⟩	ɡ	
Fricative			s			h (Note: only occurs in loanwords)
Semivowel				j ⟨y⟩	w	
Lateral			l			
Trill			r			

Makassarese consonants except the glottal stop and voiced plosives can be geminated. Some instances of these might result from Proto-Malayo-Polynesian schwa phoneme *ə (now merged into a), which geminated the following consonant (*bəli > *bəlli > balli 'to buy, price' (compare Indonesian beli), contrasting with bali 'to oppose').

The phoneme /t/ is the only consonant with a dental pronunciation, unlike the phonemes /n d s l r/, which are alveolar consonants. The voiceless plosive phonemes /p t k/ are generally pronounced with slight aspiration (a flow of air), as in the words katte [ˈkat̪.t̪ʰɛ] 'we', lampa [ˈlam.pʰa] 'go', and kana [ˈkʰa.nã] 'say'. The phonemes /b/ and /d/ have implosive allophones [ɓ] and [ɗ], especially in word-initial positions, such as in balu [ˈɓa.lu] 'widow', and after the sound [ʔ], as in aʼdoleng [aʔ.ˈɗo.lẽŋ] 'to let hang'. These two consonants, especially /b/ in word-initial positions, can also be realized as voiceless consonants without aspiration. The palatal phoneme /c/ can be realized as an affricate (a stop sound with a release of fricative) [cç] or even [tʃ]. The phoneme /ɟ/ can also be pronounced as an affricate [ɟʝ]. Jukes analyzes both of these consonants as stop consonants because they have palatal nasal counterparts /ɲ/, just as other oral stop consonants have their own nasal counterparts.

=== Phonotactics ===
The basic structure of syllables in Makassarese is (C_{1})V(C_{2}). The position of C_{1} can be filled by almost any consonant, while the position of C_{2} has some limitations. In syllables located at the end of a morpheme, C_{2} can be filled by a stop (T) or a nasal (N), the pronunciation of which is determined by assimilation rules. The sound T assimilates with (is pronounced the same as) voiceless consonants except [h], and is realized as [ʔ] in other contexts. The sound N is realized as a homorganic nasal (pronounced at the same articulation place) before a stop or nasal consonant, assimilates with the consonant's /l/ and /s/, and is realized as [ŋ] in other contexts. On the other hand, in syllables within root forms, Makassarese contrasts an additional sound in the C_{2} position besides K and N, which is /r/. This analysis is based on the fact that Makassarese distinguishes between the sequences [nr], [ʔr], and [rr] across syllables. However, [rr] can also be considered as the realization of a geminate segment rather than a sequence across syllables.

CV patterns (Note: The first two are shaded because they are not roots.)
V	o	'oh' (interjection)
CV	ri	PREP (particle)
VC	uʼ	'hair'
CVC	piʼ	'birdlime'
VV	io	'yes'
VVC	aeng	'father'
CVV	tau	'person'
CVVC	taung	'year'
VCVC	anaʼ	'child'
CVCV	sala	'wrong'
CVCVC	sabaʼ	'reason'
CVCCVC	leʼbaʼ	'already'
CVCVCV	binánga	'river'
CVCVCVC	pásaraʼ	'market'
CVCVCCV	kalúppa	'forget'
CVCCVCVC	kaʼlúrung	'palm wood'
CVCVCVCVC	balakeboʼ	'herring'
CVCVCVCCVC	kalumanynyang	'rich'

The sounds /s l r/ can be categorized as non-nasal continuous (sounds produced without fully obstructing the flow of air through the mouth) consonants, and none of them can occupy the final position of a syllable except as part of a geminate consonant sequence. Basic words that actually end with these consonants will be appended with an epenthetic vowel identical to the vowel in the preceding syllable, and closed with a glottal stop [ʔ], as in the words ótereʼ /oter/ 'rope', bótoloʼ /botol/ 'bottle', and rántasaʼ /rantas/ 'mess, untidy'. This additional element is also referred to as the "echo-VC" (paragogic vowel-consonant sequence), and it can affect the position of stress within a word.

Generally, base words in Makassarese consist of two or three syllables. However, longer words can be formed due to the agglutinative nature of Makassarese and the highly productive reduplication process. According to Jukes, words with six or seven syllables are commonly found in Makassarese, while base words with just one syllable (that are not borrowed from other languages) are very rare, although there are some interjections and particles consisting of only one syllable.

All consonants except for /ʔ/ can appear in initial position. In final position, only /ŋ/ and /ʔ/ are found.

Consonant clusters only occur medially and (with one exception) can be analyzed as clusters of /ŋ/ or /ʔ/ + consonant. These clusters also arise through sandhi across morpheme boundaries.

	nasal/lateral					voiceless obstruents					voiced stops + r				
	m	n	ɲ	ŋ	l	p	t	c	k	s	b	d	ɟ	ɡ	r
/ŋ/	mm	nn	ɲɲ	ŋŋ	ll	mp	nt	ɲc	ŋk	ns	mb	nd	ɲɟ	ŋɡ	nr
/ʔ/	ʔm	ʔn	ʔɲ	ʔŋ	ʔl	pp	tt	cc	kk	ss	ʔb	ʔd	ʔɟ	ʔɡ	ʔr

The geminate cluster /rr/ is only found in root-internal position and cannot be accounted for by the above rules.

Sequences of like vowels are contracted to a single vowel; e.g., sassa 'to wash' + -ang 'nominalizing suffix' > sassáng 'laundry', caʼdi 'small' + -i 'third person' > caʼdi 'it is small'.

=== Stress ===
The stress is generally placed on the penultimate (second-last) syllable of a base word. In reduplicated words, secondary stress will be placed on the first element, as in the word ammèkang-mékang /amˌmekaŋˈmekaŋ/ 'to fish (casually)'. Suffixes are generally counted as part of the phonological unit receiving stress, while enclitics are not counted (extrametrical). For example, the word gássing 'strong', if the benefactive suffix -ang is added, becomes gassíngang 'stronger than' with stress on the penultimate syllable, but if given the first-person marker enclitic =aʼ, it becomes gássingaʼ 'I am strong', with stress on the antepenultimate syllable (third-last).

Other morphemes counted as part of the stress-bearing unit include the affixal clitic, (Note: "Affixal clitics" or "phrasal affixes" are a group of morphemes in the Makassar language that have similar properties to affixes (because they are counted to determine stress) and clitics (because they are bound to phrases rather than words). The boundary between affixal clitics and the morphemes they affix is marked with the symbol ≡.) marking possession, as in the word tedóng=ku (buffalo=1.POSS) 'my buffalo'. Particularly for the definite marker ≡a, this morpheme is counted as part of the stress-bearing unit only if the base word it attaches to ends in a vowel, as in the word batúa 'the stone'—compare with the stress pattern in kóngkonga 'the dog', where the base word ends in a consonant. A word can have stress on the preantepenultimate (fourth-last) syllable if a two-syllable enclitic combination such as =mako (PFV =ma, 2 =ko) is appended; e.g., náiʼmako 'go up!' The stress position can also be influenced by the process of vocalic degemination, where identical vowels across morphemes merge into one. For example, the word jappa 'walk', when the suffix -ang is added, becomes jappáng 'to walk with', with stress on the ultimate (last) syllable.

The stress on base words with echo-VC always falls on the antepenultimate syllable; for example, lápisiʼ 'layer', bótoloʼ 'bottle', pásaraʼ 'market', and Mangkásaraʼ 'Makassar', because syllables with VK-geminate are extrametrical. However, the addition of suffixes -ang and -i will remove this epenthetic syllable and move the stress to the penultimate position, as in the word lapísi 'to layer'. Adding the possessive clitic suffix also shifts the stress to the penultimate position but does not remove this epenthetic syllable, as in the word botolóʼna 'its bottle'. Meanwhile, the addition of the definite marker and enclitics neither remove nor alter the stress position of this syllable, as in the words pásaraka 'that market' and appásarakaʼ 'I'm going to the market'.

== Grammar ==
=== Pronouns ===
Personal pronouns in the Makassar language have three forms, namely:

- free forms;
- proclitics that cross-reference S and P arguments ('absolutive');
- and enclitics that cross-reference A arguments ('ergative').

The following table shows these three forms of pronouns along with possessive markers for each series.

Personal pronouns
	Free pronouns (PRO)	Proclitic (ERG)	Enclitic (ABS)	Possessive marker (POSS)
1SG	(i)nakke	ku=	=aʼ	=ku
1PL.INCL/2HON	(i)katte	ki=	=kiʼ	=ta
1PL.EXCL	†(i)kambe	—N/a	*=kang	†=mang
2FAM	(i)kau	nu=	=ko	=nu
3	ia	na=	=i	=na

The first person plural inclusive pronouns are also used to refer to the second person plural and serve as a form of respect for the second person singular. The first person plural pronoun series ku= is commonly used to refer to the first person plural in modern Makassar; pronouns kambe and possessive marker =mang are considered archaic, while the enclitic =kang can only appear in combination with clitic markers of modality and aspect, such as =pakang (IPFV =pa, 1PL.EXCL =kang). The plural meaning can be expressed more clearly by adding the word ngaseng 'all' after the free form, as in ia–ngaseng 'they all' and ikau–ngaseng 'you all', or before the enclitic, as in ngaseng=i 'they all'. However, ngaseng cannot be paired with proclitics.

Proclitic and enclitic forms are the most common pronominal forms used to refer to the person or object being addressed (see the #Basic Clauses section for examples of their use). Free forms are less frequently used; their use is generally limited to presentative clauses (clauses that state or introduce something, see example 1), for emphasis (2), in prepositional phrases functioning as arguments or adjuncts (3), and as predicates (4).

ia =mo =i (a)njo allo maka- rua ≡a
3PRO =PFV =3 that day ORD- two ≡DEF
'that was the second day.'

lompo- lompo =i anaʼ ≡na na i- nakke tena =pa ku= tianang
RDP- big =3 child ≡3.POSS and PERS- 1PRO NEG =IPF 1= pregnant
'… his child is growing, and me, Iʼm not yet pregnant.'

aN(N)- pinawang =a' ri katte
BV- follow =1 PREP 2FAMPRO
'Iʼm following you.'

i- nakke =ja =i
PERS- 1PRO =LIM =3
'itʼs only me.'

=== Nouns and noun phrases ===
==== Characteristics and types of nouns ====
Nouns in Makassarese are a class of words that can function as arguments for a predicate, allowing them to be cross-referenced by pronominal clitics. Nouns can also serve as the head of a noun phrase (including relative clauses). In possessive constructions, nouns can act as either the possessor or the possessed; an affixal clitic will be attached to the possessed noun phrase. The indefiniteness of a noun can be expressed by the affixal clitic ≡a. Uninflected nouns can also function as predicates in a sentence. All of these main points are illustrated in the following example:

anaʼ ≡na =i karaeng ≡a
child ≡3.POSS =3 king ≡DEF
he is the son of the king.'

In addition, nouns can also be specified by demonstratives, modified by adjectives, quantified by numerals, become complements in prepositional phrases, and become verbs meaning 'wear/use [the noun in question]' when affixed with the prefix aK-.

Nouns that are usually affixed with the definite clitic ≡a and possessive markers are common nouns. On the other hand, proper nouns such as place names, personal names, and titles (excluding kinship terms) are usually not affixed with definiteness and possessive markers but can be paired with the personal prefix i- like pronouns.

Some common nouns are generic nouns that often become the core of a compound word, such as the words jeʼneʼ 'water', tai 'excrement', and anaʼ 'child'. Examples of compound words derived from these generic nouns are jeʼneʼ inung 'drinking water', tai bani 'wax, beeswax' (literal meaning: 'bee excrement'), and anaʼ baine 'daughter'. Kinship terms that are commonly used as greetings are also classified as common nouns, such as the words mangge 'father', anrong 'mother', and sariʼbattang 'sibling'. Another example is the word daeng which is used as a polite greeting in general, or by a wife to her husband.

The other main noun group is temporal nouns, which usually appear after prepositions in adjunct constructions to express time. Examples of temporal nouns are clock times (such as tetteʼ lima '5.00 [five o'clock]'), estimated times based on divisions of the day (such as bariʼbasaʼ 'morning'), days of the week, as well as dates, months, and seasons.

==== Derived noun ====
Derived nouns in Makassarese are formed through several productive morphological processes, such as reduplication and affixation with pa-, ka-, and -ang, either individually or in combination. The following table illustrates some common noun formation processes in Makassarese:

Formation of derived nouns
Process		Productive meanings	Samples	Note
reduplication		diminution or imitation	tau 'people' → tau-tau 'statue, doll'	
suffix pa-	pa-NOMINAL/VERBAL ROOT	actor, creator, or user	jarang 'horse' → pajarang 'rider'; botoroʼ 'gamble' → pabotoroʼ 'gambler'	
suffix pa-	pa-VERB BASE (Note: The 'verb base' referred to is a verb with the prefix aK- or aN(N)-. Manyambeang, Mulya & Nasruddin (1996) analyze this form as PaK-/paN(N)- + verb root, but Jukes argues that this analysis is less elegant because it assumes a greater number of affix morphemes. Furthermore, this analysis also cannot explain why PaK- and paN(N)- are commonly found on verbs that can be affixed with aK- and aN(N)-.)	instrument	akkutaʼnang 'ask' → pakkutaʼnang 'question'; anjoʼjoʼ 'point' → panjoʼjoʼ 'index finger, pointer'	
suffix pa-	pa-DERIVED VERBAL BASES (Note: For example, like causative verbs that are derived from verb roots with the prefix pa- (homonymous with the noun-forming prefix) or derived from adjective roots with paka-.)	instrument	appakagassing 'fortifiying' → pappakagassing 'tonic, fortifying medicine or drink'	
suffix pa-	pa>VERB BASE<ang	place or time	aʼjeʼneʼ 'bathe' → paʼjeʼnekang 'bathing place, bathtime'; angnganre 'eat' → pangnganreang 'plate'	
suffix pa-	paK>ADJECTIVE<ang (Note: Specifically for this form, Jukes analyzes the prefix as paK- instead of pa- + aK-, because the adjective can stand alone as a predicate without the aK- prefix.)	someone who is easily ADJ, inclined to be ADJ	garring 'sick' → paʼgarringang 'sickly person'	
confix ka>...<ang	ka>ADJECTIVE<ang	ADJ-ness	kodi 'bad' → kakodiang 'badness'	
confix ka>...<ang	ka>REDUPLICATED ADJECTIVAL<ang	peak of ADJ	gassing 'strong' → kagassing-gassingang 'greatest strength' (Note: example: ka> gassing- gassing <ang ≡na =mo =i NR> RDP- strong <NR ≡3.POSS =PFV =3 'heʼs already at the peak of his strength')	
confix ka>...<ang	ka>BASIC VERB<ang	state or process	battu 'come' → kabattuang 'arrival'	
suffix -ang		instrument	buleʼ 'carry on shoulders' → bulekang 'sedan chair'	

There are some exceptions to the general patterns described above. For example, reduplication of the word oloʼ 'worm' to oloʼ-oloʼ results in a broadening of meaning to 'animal'. The affixation of pa- to a verb base does not always indicate an instrument or tool, for example paʼmaiʼ 'breath, character, heart' (as in the phrase lompo paʼmaiʼ 'big-hearted') which is derived from the word aʼmaiʼ 'to breathe'. The affixation of pa>...<ang to the verb base ammanaʼ 'to give birth' results in the word pammanakang meaning 'family', although it is possible that this word was originally a metaphor ('place to have children').

==== Noun phrase ====
The components of noun phrases in the Makassarese can be categorized into three groups, namely 1) head, 2) specifier, and 3) modifier.

Modifying elements always follow the head noun-they may be of various types:

- modifying nouns, such as bawi romang 'wild boar' (lit. pig forest)
- adjectives, such as jukuʼ lompo 'big fish'
- modifying verbs, such as kappalaʼ anriʼbaʼ 'airplane' (lit. flying ship)
- possessors, such as tedonna i Ali 'Ali's buffalo'
- relative clauses

In Makassarese, relative clauses are placed directly after the head noun without any special marker (unlike Indonesian, which requires a word like 'yang' before the relative clause). The verb within the relative clause is marked with the definite marker ≡a.

tau battu ≡a ri Japáng
person come ≡DEF PREP Japan
'the person who came from Japan.'

== Verb ==
=== Basic clause ===
==== Intransitive clauses ====
In Makassarese intransitive clauses, the 'absolutive' enclitic (=ABS) is used to cross-reference the sole argument in the clause (S) if that argument is definite or salient according to the conversational context. This enclitic tends to be attached to the first constituent in a clause. The aK- prefix is commonly used to form intransitive verbs, although some verbs like tinro 'sleep' do not require this prefix.

aK- jappa =i Balanda ≡a
MW- walk =3 Dutch ≡DEF
'The Dutchman is walking.'

tinro =i i Ali
sleep =3 PERS Ali
'Ali is sleeping.'

Many other types of phrases may head intransitive clauses, for example nominals (13) and pronoun (example (4) above), adjectives (14), or a prepositional phrase (15):

jarang =aʼ
horse =1
'I am a horse.'

bambang =i allo ≡a
hot =3 day ≡DEF
'This day is hot.'

ri ballaʼ ≡na =i
PREP house ≡3.POSS =3
'Heʼs at home.'

==== Transitive clauses ====
Verbs in transitive clauses are not affixed, but instead are marked with a pronominal proclitic indicating the A or actor and a pronominal enclitic indicating the P or undergoer.

na= kokkoʼ =aʼ miong ≡ku
3= bite =1 cat ≡1.POSS
'My cat bit me.'

=== Tense, Aspect, and Modality ===
In addition to the personal pronoun clitics used to cross-reference arguments within a sentence, the Makassar language also possesses a series of clitics employed to mark grammatical meanings such as tense, aspect, modality, and polarity (affirmation and negation). The clitics belonging to this group are the proclitics la= FUT and ta= NEG, and the enclitics =mo PFV, =pa IPF, =ja LIM, and =ka OR. These types of clitics are generally placed before the pronominal clitics (if any), whether in initial or final position on the base word they attach to. The vowel sound in the aspect/modality enclitics is dropped if followed by the pronominal enclitics =aʼ and =i, with the exception of the enclitic =ka, which becomes =kai when paired with =i. The following table shows the combinations between the aspect/modality and pronominal enclitics:

Tense, Aspect, Modality and pronominal enclitics
	=aʼ 1	=kiʼ 1PL.INCL/2HON	=kang 1PL.EXCL	=ko 2FAM	=i 3
=mo PFV	=maʼ	=makiʼ	=makang	=mako	=mi
=pa IPF	=paʼ	=pakiʼ	=pakang	=pako	=pi
=ja LIM	=jaʼ	=jakiʼ	=jakang	=jako	=ji
=ka OR	=kaʼ	=kakiʼ	=kakang	=kako	=kai

The proclitic ta=, although the most basic negation morpheme in the Makassarese, is not the most commonly used negator. Negation constructions generally use a combination of words that have undergone grammaticalization, such as taena ('no,' 'not').

Meanwhile, the proclitic la= can be used to express the future tense or the meaning of 'will,' as in the following example:

la= mange =aʼ ri pasaraʼ ≡a ammuko
FUT= go =1 PREP market ≡DEF tomorrow
'I’ll go to the market tomorrow.'

The proclitic la= can also be found in questions, such as the expression lakerekomae? or lakekomae? ('Where are you going?'). This is a common greeting in Makassarese.

The use of the perfective clitic =mo together with la= indicates that the event referred to by both clitics will happen 'immediately'.

la= ku= sare =mo =ko pa> aK- areng <ang
FUT= 1= give =PFV =2FAM NR> MV- name <NR
'I will give you a naming (right now).'

The enclitic =mo itself fundamentally serves as a marker for the perfective aspect or the meaning of 'already/has/have done'.

piraN- bulang =mo =i battang ≡ta si- bulang =mo =aʼ ta= aK- ciniʼ ceraʼ
how.many month =PFV =3 belly ≡2HON.POSS one- month =PFV =1 NEG= MV- see blood
'How many months have you been pregnant? (lit: how many months your belly?) It’s already a month since I saw any blood.'

This enclitic also carries deontic meaning (indicating necessity or certainty) and can be used in imperative constructions, as in example (9). In interrogative constructions, the addition of the enclitic =mo signals that the questioner desires a definite answer.

amm- empo =mo =kiʼ
MV- sit =PFV =2HON
'Please sit yourself down.'

kere =mo =i mae pa> amm- antang <ang ≡nu
{where} =PFV =3 mae NR> MV- live <NR ≡2FAM.POSS
'Where exactly is your home?'

The opposite of =mo is the imperfective enclitic =pa, which conveys the meaning of 'not yet finished' or 'still'.

ingka seʼre =pa =i ku= boya
but one =IPFV =3 1= search
'But there's still one thing Iseek.'

The meaning of 'only, just' (in the sense of 'no more than' or 'nothing other than') is conveyed by the limitative enclitic =ja. Example usage:

manna antu lompo lompo bannang =ja =i
although that big big thread =LIM =3
'Even if that's thick, it's only a thick thread (ie. it may be big, but it's only big for a small thing).'

The enclitic =ka has two functions. In question sentences, this enclitic is used to request certainty or clarify the opponent's statement, similar to a questiontag in English.

la= naung =ka =ko
FUT= descend =OR =2FAM
'Will you really go down?'

Another function of the enclitic =ka is to mark choice or possibility, for example tedong=ka jarang=ka (buffalo=OR horse=OR) '[the choice is] between a buffalo or a horse'. A longer example of its usage can be seen in the following quote from the preface of the Gowa Chronicles:

ka punna ta= ni- asseng ≡a rua =i kodi ≡na ki= saʼring =ka =i kale ≡nta karaeng dudu na kana =ka tau i pantaraʼ ≡a tau bawang dudu
BCS if NEG= PASS- know ≡DEF two =3 bad ≡3.POSS HON= feel =OR =3 self ≡2HON.POSS king very and word =OR person PREP outside ≡DEF person ordinary very
'Because if it is not known, there are two dangers: either we will feel ourselves to be kings too, or outsiders will call us common people.'

== Writing systems ==
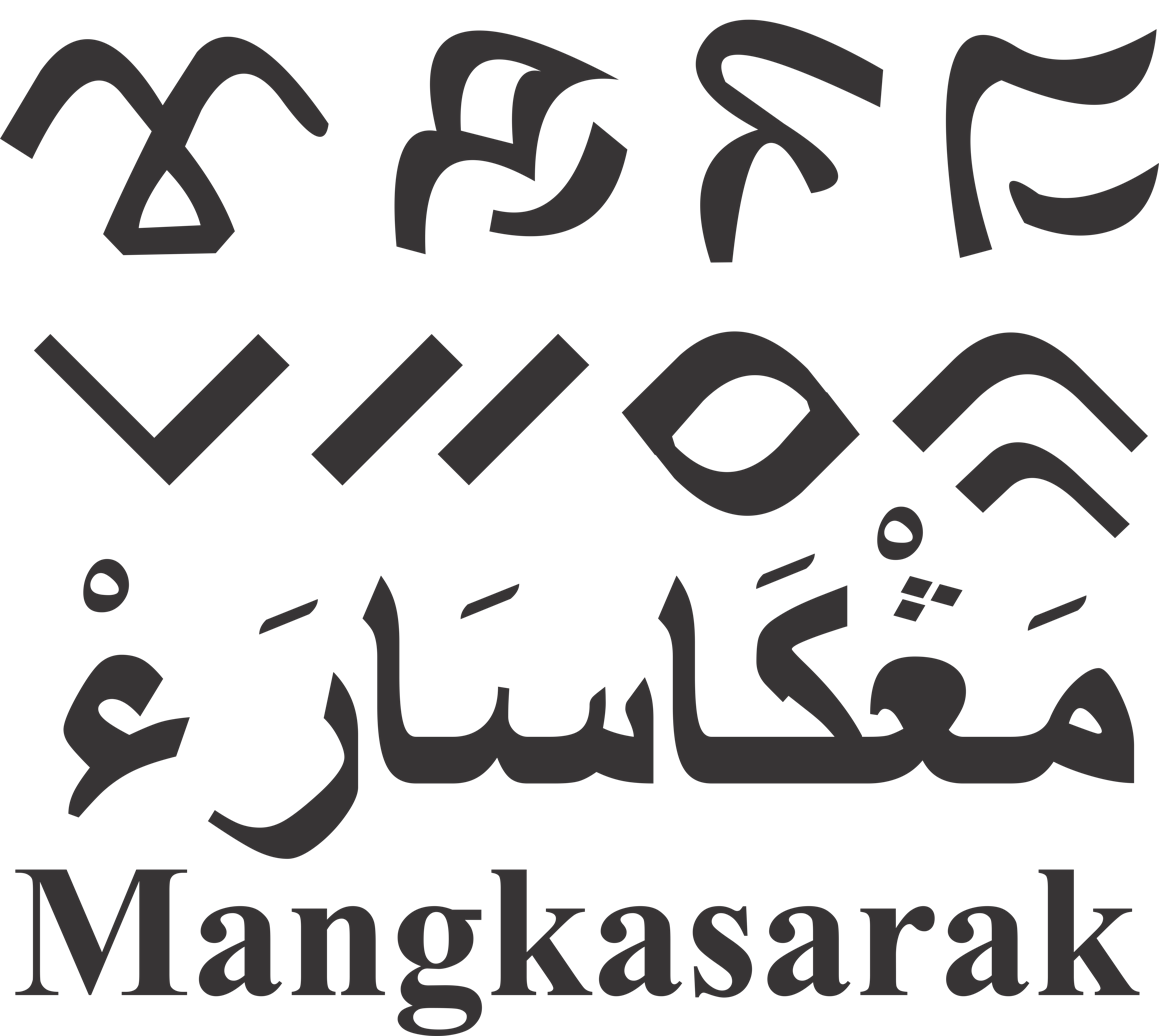
1. Makasar script; 2. Lontara script; 3. Serang script; 4. Latin script

Although Makassarese is now often written in Latin script, Makassarese has been traditionally written with Lontara script and Makasar script, which once was used also to write important documents in Bugis and Mandar, two related languages from Sulawesi. Further, Makassarese was written in the Serang script, a variant of the Arabic-derived Jawi script. Texts written in the Serang script are relatively rare, and mostly appear in connection with Islam-related topics. Parts of the Makassar Annals, the chronicles of the Gowa and Tallo' kingdoms, were also written using the Serang script.

=== Latin-based system ===
The current Latin-based forms:

Majuscule forms (uppercase)
A	B	C	D	E	G	H	I	J	K	L	M	N	Ng (Note: counted as digraph, not a single letter)	Ny	O	P	R	S	T	U	W	Y	(ʼ) (Note: nonstandard orthography)
Minuscule forms (lowercase)
a	b	c	d	e	g	h	i	j	k	l	m	n	ng	ny	o	p	r	s	t	u	w	y	(ʼ)
IPA
a	b	c	d	e	ɡ	h	i	ɟ	k, ʔ (Note: glottal stop only appear in final consonant of closed sylable)	l	m	n	ŋ	ɲ	o	p	r	s	t	u	w	j	ʔ

Comparison of Makassarese orthography
	u	c	ɟ	ŋ	ɲ	-ʔ	(stressed vowels)
Matthes (1859)	oe	t͠j	d͠j	n͠g	n͠j	◌́, ◌̉	◌̂
Cense (1979)	u	tj	dj	ŋ	ñ	-ʼ	◌̀
Indonesian based (1975)	u	c	j	ng	ny	-k	(not written)
Locally preferred	u	c	j	ng	ny	-ʼ	(not written)

=== Old Makassar and Lontara script ===
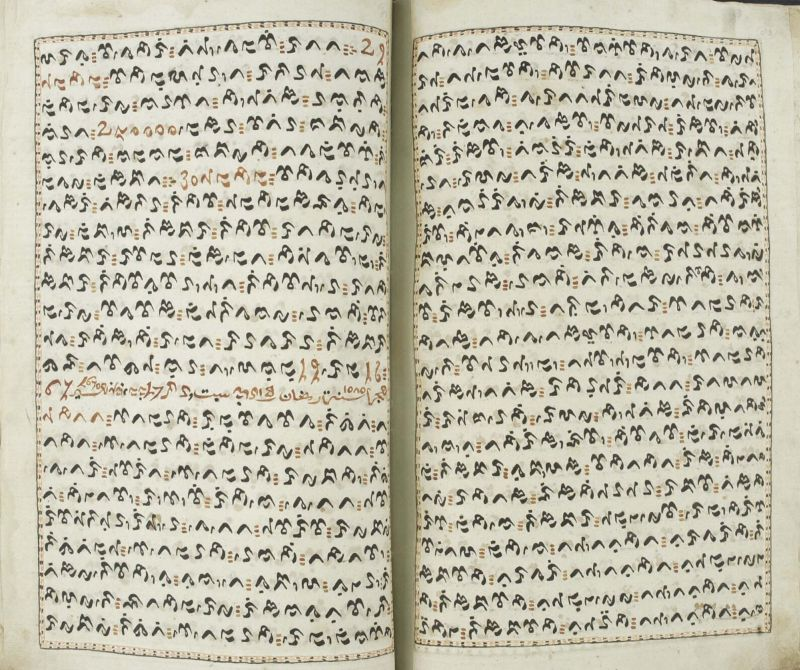
Sample of a handwritten book, written in Makassarese using the Makasar script, of a diary of the Princes of the Sultanate of Gowa. The passimbang punctuation signs, typical of this script, are drawn and colored in red, as well as a few proper names and some inserts in Arabic.

Makassarese was historically written using Makasar script (also known as "Old Makassarese" or "Makassarese bird script" in English-language scholarly works). In Makassarese the script is known as ukiriʼ jangang-jangang or huruf jangang-jangang ('bird letters'). It was used for official purposes in the kingdoms of Makasar during the 17th century but ceased to be used by the 19th century, being replaced by Lontara script.

In spite of their quite distinctive appearance, both the Makasar and Lontara scripts are derived from the ancient Brāhmī script of India. Like other descendants of the script, each consonant has an inherent vowel "a", which is not marked. Other vowels can be indicated by adding diacritics above, below, or on either side of each consonant.

Base consonant letters
	ka	ga	nga	pa	ba	ma	ta	da	na	ca	ja	nya	ya	ra	la	wa	sa	a	ha
Old Makassarese	𑻠	𑻡	𑻢	𑻣	𑻤	𑻥	𑻦	𑻧	𑻨	𑻩	𑻪	𑻫	𑻬	𑻭	𑻮	𑻯	𑻰	𑻱	(𑻱 (Note: Although the letter ha (ᨖ) is not present in the Old Makassar script and is actually a borrowed sound from Arabic and Dutch, phonetically, the [h] sound in loanwords is often left unpronounced. For example, the word haʼji [ˈhaʔɟi] (Arabic: حَجِّيّ ḥajjiyy) becomes aʼji [ˈaʔɟi]))
Lontara script	ᨀ	ᨁ	ᨂ	ᨄ	ᨅ	ᨆ	ᨈ	ᨉ	ᨊ	ᨌ	ᨍ	ᨎ	ᨐ	ᨑ	ᨒ	ᨓ	ᨔ	ᨕ	ᨖ

==== Ambiguity ====
Both scripts do not have a virama or other ways to write syllable codas in a consistent manner, even though codas occur regularly in Makassar. For example, in Makassar is baba ᨅᨅ which can correspond to six possible words: baba, babaʼ, baʼba, baʼbaʼ, bamba, and bambang.

Given that Lontara script is also traditionally written without word breaks, a typical text often has many ambiguous portions which can often only be disambiguated through context. This ambiguity is analogous to the use of Arabic letters without vowel markers; readers whose native language use Arabic characters intuitively understand which vowels are appropriate in a given sentence so that vowel markers are not needed in standard everyday texts.

Even so, sometimes even context is not sufficient. In order to read a text fluently, readers may need substantial prior knowledge of the language and contents of the text in question. As an illustration, Cummings and Jukes provide the following example to illustrate how the Lontara script can produce different meanings depending on how the reader cuts and fills in the ambiguous part:

Lontara script	Possible reading	
Lontara script	Latin	Meaning
ᨕᨅᨙᨈᨕᨗ	aʼbétai	he won (intransitive)
ᨕᨅᨙᨈᨕᨗ	ambetái	he beat... (transitive)
ᨊᨀᨑᨙᨕᨗᨄᨙᨄᨙᨅᨒᨉᨈᨚᨀ	nakanrei pepeʼ ballaʼ datoka	fire devouring a temple
ᨊᨀᨑᨙᨕᨗᨄᨙᨄᨙᨅᨒᨉᨈᨚᨀ	nakanrei pepe' Balanda tokkaʼ	fire devouring a bald Hollander
ᨄᨙᨄᨙ	pepe	mute
ᨄᨙᨄᨙ	pepeʼ	fire
ᨄᨙᨄᨙ	pempeng	stuck together
ᨄᨙᨄᨙ	peppeʼ	hit

Without knowing the actual event to which the text may be referring, it can be impossible for first time readers to determine the "correct" reading of the above examples. Even the most proficient readers may need to pause and re-interpret what they have read as new context is revealed in later portions of the same text. Due to this ambiguity, some writers such as Noorduyn labelled Lontara as a defective script.

=== Serang script ===
After Islam arrived in 1605, and with Malay traders using the Arabic-based Jawi script, Makassarese could also be written using Arabic letters. This was called 'serang' and was better at capturing the spoken language than the original Makassarese scripts because it could show consonants at the ends of syllables. But it wasn't widely used, with only a few surviving manuscripts. One key example is the diary of the Gowa and Tallo' courts, translated from serang into Dutch. However, Arabic script is commonly found in manuscripts to write Islamic names, dates, and religious ideas.

List of Letters
alif ا IPA: /a/	ba ب IPA: /b/	ta ت IPA: /t/	tsa ث IPA: /s/ (Note: Mostly used to write Arabic loans)	jim ج IPA: /d͡ʒ/	ca چ IPA: /t͡ʃ/	ha ح IPA: /h/	kho خ IPA: /x/
dal د IPA: /d/	dzal ذ IPA: /z/	ro ر IPA: /r/	zai ز IPA: /z/	sin س IPA: /s/	syin ش IPA: /ʃ/	shod ص IPA: /s/	dhod ض IPA: /d/
tho ط IPA: /t/	zho ظ IPA: /z/	ain ع IPA: /ʔ/	ghoin غ IPA: /ɣ/	nga ڠ IPA: /ŋ/	fa ف IPA: /f/	pa ڤ IPA: /p/	qof ق IPA: /q/
kaf ك IPA: /k/	gaf ࢴ IPA: /g/	la ل IPA: /l/	ma م IPA: /m/	na ن IPA: /n/	nya ۑ IPA: /ɲ/	ha ه IPA: /h/	wa و IPA: /w/ /u, ɔ/
ya ي IPA: /j/ /i, ɛ/

List of Vowels
vowel	◌َ / ◌َـا a IPA: /a/	◌ِ / ◌ِـي i IPA: /i/	◌ِ / ◌ِـي e IPA: /e/	◌ُ / ◌ُـو u IPA: /u/	◌ُ / ◌ُـو o IPA: /o/	◌ْ - IPA: /∅/

In the Arabic orthography, there are matres lectionis, the letters alif, waw, and ya. These letters are consonants, but they serve a double purpose of showing vowel values in some way. As Arabic has 3 vowel sounds, and each vowel sound has a short and a long variety, these three letters are used for indicating vowel length differentiation. In Jawi, they are written subject to specific rules regarding vowel sound and whether or not a syllable is closed; and also subject to long standardized orthography of certain exceptions. In Pegon script, their use is highly standardized, directly corresponding to the vowels represented, and in fact this is one of the key distinguishing features between Jawi and Pegon. In Serang, at least as seen in manuscripts.

== Sample text ==
Sample text
Old Makassar script	𑻨𑻳𑻰𑻴𑻭𑻶𑻥𑻳𑻷𑻥𑻮𑻱𑻵𑻠𑻲𑻷𑻱𑻢𑻴𑻠𑻳𑻭𑻳𑻠𑻳𑻱𑻭𑻵𑻨𑻷𑻰𑻳𑻬𑻡𑻱𑻷𑻱𑻵𑻣𑻶𑻯𑻨𑻷𑻠𑻥𑻦𑻵𑻬𑻨𑻷𑻰𑻳𑻬𑻡𑻱𑻷𑻮𑻭𑻳𑻠𑻥𑻦𑻵𑻬𑻨𑻷 𑻨𑻲𑻱𑻵𑻭𑻥𑻶𑻷𑻥𑻮𑻱𑻵𑻠𑻲𑻷𑻥𑻢𑻵𑻷𑻭𑻳𑻥𑻮𑻠𑻴𑻮𑻴𑻥𑻱𑻴𑻦𑻳𑻷
Lontara script	ᨊᨗᨔᨘᨑᨚᨆᨗ᨞ᨆᨒᨕᨙᨀᨀ᨞ᨕᨂᨘᨀᨗᨑᨗᨀᨗᨕᨑᨙᨊ᨞ᨔᨗᨐᨁᨕ᨞ᨕᨙᨄᨚᨓᨊ᨞ᨀᨆᨈᨙᨐᨊ᨞ᨔᨗᨐᨁᨕ᨞ᨒᨑᨗᨀᨆᨈᨙᨐᨊ᨞ ᨊᨊᨕᨙᨑᨆᨚ᨞ᨆᨒᨕᨙᨀᨀ᨞ᨆᨂᨙ᨞ᨑᨗᨆᨒᨀᨘᨒᨘᨆᨕᨘᨈᨗ᨞
Serang script	نِسُوْرُمِ مَلَائِكَكَةْ أَڠُّكِرِيْرِكِ أَرِيِنَّ سِيَࢴَاءً إِمْفُوَانَّ كَمَتِيَانَّ سِيَࢴَاءً لَنْرِ كَمَتِيَانَّ نَنَئِيْرَمَّ مَلَائِكَكَة مَاڠِيْ رِ مَلَكُ الْمَوْتِ
Latin Script	Nisuromi malaekaka anngukiriki arenna, siagáng empoanna kamateanna, siagáng lanri kamateanna, na naerammo malaekaka mange ri Malakulmauti.
Translation	The malāʾikah were ordered to record his name, the circumstances of his death, and the cause of his death, then the malāʾikah took him to Malak al-Mawt.

Some common words and phrases in the Makassarese language, transcribed in the Latin script, are as follows (⟨ʼ⟩ represents the glottal stop).

Writing system examples
Lontara	Romanized	Indonesian	Translation
ᨈᨕᨘ	tau	orang	people
ᨄᨎᨗᨀᨗ	paʼnyiki	kelelawar	bat
ᨕᨑᨙ	areng	nama	name
ᨕᨊ	anaʼ	anak	child
ᨔᨙᨑᨙ᨞ ᨑᨘᨓ᨞ ᨈᨒᨘ᨞ ᨕᨄ᨞ ᨒᨗᨆ᨞	seʼre, rua, tallu, appaʼ, lima	satu, dua, tiga, empat, lima	one, two, three, four, five
ᨅᨕᨗᨊᨙ	baine	perempuan, istri	female, woman, wife
ᨅᨘᨑᨊᨙ	buraʼne	lelaki, suami	male, man, husband
ᨈᨅᨙ	tabeʼ	permisi, maaf	excuse me, sorry
ᨈᨕᨙᨊ, ᨈᨙᨊ, ᨈᨑᨙ	taena, tena, tanreʼ	tiada	none, nothing
ᨒᨙᨅ	leʼbaʼ	telah	already
ᨔᨒᨆᨀᨗ ᨅᨈᨘ ᨆᨕᨙ	salamakkiʼ battu mae	selamat datang	welcome
ᨕᨄ ᨕᨈᨘ ᨆᨕᨙ ᨀᨅᨑ?	apa antu mae kabaraʼ?	apa kabar?	how are you?
ᨅᨍᨗᨅᨍᨗᨍᨗ	bajiʼ-bajiʼji	baik-baik saja	I am fine
ᨊᨕᨗ ᨕᨑᨙᨊᨘ?	nai arenta?	siapa namamu?	what's your name?
ᨒᨀᨙᨑᨙᨀᨗ ᨆᨕᨙ? ᨒᨀᨙᨀᨗ ᨆᨕᨙ? ᨒᨀᨙᨆᨕᨗᨀᨗ?	lakereki mae?, lakekimae?, lakemaeki?	kamu mau ke mana?	where are you going?
ᨀᨙᨑᨙᨀᨗ ᨆᨕᨙ ᨕᨆᨈ	kerekiʼ mae ammantang?	kamu tinggal di mana?	where do you live?
ᨔᨗᨐᨄᨆᨗ ᨕᨘᨆᨘᨑᨘᨈ?	siapami umuruʼta?	berapa usiamu?	how old are you?
ᨔᨒᨆᨀᨗ ᨑᨗ ᨆᨂᨙᨕᨈᨙ	salamakkiʼ ri mangeanta	selamat sampai tujuan	have a safe trip
ᨔᨒᨆᨀᨗ ᨑᨗ ᨒᨄᨈ	salamakkiʼ ri lampanta	selamat tinggal	goodbye
ᨅᨈᨘ ᨑᨗ ᨀᨈᨙ	battu ri katte	tergantung padamu	it depends on you

== See also ==
- Makassan contact with Australia
