= Bentong language =

Language spoken in Indonesia

Bentong
- Native to: Indonesia
- Region: South Sulawesi
- Native speakers: 10,000 (2010)
- Language family: Austronesian: Malayo-Polynesian; South Sulawesi; Makassaric; Bentong

Language codes
- ISO 639-3: bnu
- Glottolog: bent1237
- Map showing the distribution of the South Sulawesi languages in Sulawesi and Kalimantan. Bentong language is marked with number 5 in the Makassar languages group.
- Coordinates: 4°46′S 119°48′E

Bentong is an Austronesian language of Sulawesi, Indonesia, that is closely related to Makassarese. This language is spoken on the border between the regencies of Barru and Bone, South Sulawesi.
