= Betong =

Betong may refer to:

- Places in Sarawak, Malaysia:
  - Betong, Sarawak (town)
  - Betong Division
  - Betong (federal constituency), represented in the Dewan Rakyat
- Places in Yala Province, Thailand
  - Betong, Thailand – Town
  - Betong district – Thailand (amphoe)
- Betong Sumaya – Filipino comedian
- Betong, a character in Bitoy's World

== See also ==
- Bentong
- Bettong – any of several species of the genus Bettongia, sometimes referred to as rat-kangaroos
