= Highland Konjo language =

Language spoken in Indonesia

Highland Konjo
- Konjo Pegunungan
- Konjo Iraja, Konjo Buluʼ
- Native to: Indonesia
- Region: South Sulawesi
- Native speakers: 69,000 (2010)
- Language family: Austronesian: Malayo-Polynesian; South Sulawesi; Makassaric; Highland Konjo

Language codes
- ISO 639-3: kjk
- Glottolog: high1275
- Map showing the distribution of the South Sulawesi languages in Sulawesi and Kalimantan. Highland Konjo language is marked with number 7 in the Makassar languages group.
- Coordinates: 5°16′S 119°56′E

Highland Konjo is an Austronesian language of Sulawesi, Indonesia, which belongs to the Makassaric branch of the South Sulawesi subgroup. It is spoken in the interior parts of Bone, Bulukumba, Gowa, and Sinjai regencies of South Sulawesi province, in the area to the northwest of Mount Lompobatang. It is closely related to, but distinct from Coastal Konjo, which also belongs to the Makassaric languages.
