= Coastal Konjo language =

Language spoken in Indonesia

Coastal Konjo
- Konjo Ilau’, Konjo Bulukkumba
- Native to: Indonesia
- Region: South Sulawesi
- Native speakers: 170,000 (2010 census)
- Language family: Austronesian: Malayo-Polynesian; South Sulawesi; Makassaric; Coastal Konjo

Language codes
- ISO 639-3: kjc
- Glottolog: coas1295
- Map showing the distribution of the South Sulawesi languages in Sulawesi and Kalimantan. Coastal Konjo language is marked with number 6 in the Makassar languages group.
- Coordinates: 5°25′00″S 120°18′00″E

Coastal Konjo is an Austronesian language of Sulawesi, Indonesia, which belongs to the Makassaric branch of the South Sulawesi subgroup. It is spoken along the coast in the southeastern corner of South Sulawesi in the regencies of Sinjai, Bulukumba and Bantaeng. It is closely related to, but distinct from Highland Konjo, which also belongs to the Makassaric languages.

== Phonology ==
The following sound inventory is based on Friberg & Friberg (1991).

Vowels
	Front	Back
High	i	u
Mid	e	o
Low	a	

The vowel /a/ is realized as [ə] before geminate nasals.

Consonants
		Labial	Alveolar	Palatal	Velar	Glottal
Nasal		m	n	ɲ	ŋ	
Plosive/ Affricate	voiceless	p	t	t͡ʃ	k	ʔ
Plosive/ Affricate	voiced	b	d	d͡ʒ	ɡ	
Fricative			s			h
Semivowel				j	w	
Lateral			l			
Trill			r			

Only [ŋ] and [ʔ] can appear in final position. Words with underlying final /s/, /l/ or /r/ add an echo vowel, e.g. /nipis/ ['nipisi] 'thin'.

== Grammar ==
Personal pronouns in Coastal Konjo have one independent form, and three bound forms.

Personal pronouns
	free	ergative	absolutive	possessive
1.sg./1.pl.excl.	nakke	ku-	-a	-ku
1.pl.incl./2.honorific	gitte	ki-	-ki	-ta
2.familiar	kau	nu-	-ko	-mu
3.	ia	na-	-i	-na
