= Makassar languages =

Group of languages in Indonesia

Makassar
- Makassaric
- Geographic distribution: Indonesia (Sulawesi)
- Linguistic classification: Austronesian: Malayo-Polynesian; South Sulawesi; Makassar
- Subdivisions: Bentong; Coastal Konjo; Highland Konjo; Makassarese; Selayar

Language codes
- Glottolog: maka1310
- Map showing the distribution of the South Sulawesi languages in Sulawesi and Kalimantan. Languages within Makassar languages group, varying between number 6 to 10.
- Interactive map of Makassar languages, click the map Marker for further detail and navigation.

The Makassar languages are a group of languages spoken in the southern part of South Sulawesi Province, Indonesia, and make up one of the branches of the South Sulawesi subgroup in the Austronesian language family. The most prominent member of this group is Makassarese, with over two million speakers in the city of Makassar and neighboring areas.

The status of the Makassar languages, other than Makassarese, as distinct languages is not universally accepted. In older classifications, as well as in recent studies by local linguists, they are considered to be dialects of the Makassarese language.

== Languages ==
- Makassarese
- Bentong
- Coastal Konjo
- Highland Konjo
- Selayar

== Phonology ==
A characteristic feature of the Makassar languages is the occurrence of echo vowels with stems ending in final /r/, /l/ or /s/. E.g. /botol/ 'bottle' is realized as bótolo in Selayar and Coastal Konjo, and as bótoloʔ in Makassarese and Highland Konjo (the latter regularly adds a glottal stop to the echo vowel). This echo vowel is dropped if a suffix is added, but retained if followed by an enclitic.

	Makassarese	Selayar
base	/rantas/ rántasaʔ 'dirty'	/lambus/ lámbusu 'straight'
with suffix	/rantas/ + /-aŋ/ rantás-aŋ 'dirtier'	/lambus/ + /-aŋ/ lambús-aŋ 'straighter'
with enclitic	/rantas/ + /=aʔ/ rántasak=aʔ 'I am dirty'	/lambus/ + /=a/ lámbusu=a 'I am straight'

Konjo (both Coastal and Highland Konjo), Bentong, Selayar and the Labbakkang dialect of Makassarese have j /ɟ/ and /h/ where Makassarese (Maros, Goa, Takalar, Jeneponto, Bantaeng) has y /j/ and /w/. In some words, Coastal/Highland Konjo and Selayar have h corresponding to zero in Makassarese, e.g. Konjo/Selayar bahine ('female'), uhuʔ ('hair') vs. Makassarese baine, uʔ.

	Makassarese	Konjo	Selayar
pig	bawi	bahi	bahi
time	wattu	hattu	hattu
many, much	lowe, (Note: it written as loe, balao in standard orthography) (Note: dialect form) (jai)	lohe	lohe
rat, mouse	balawo	balaho	balaho
wait	tayang	tajang	tajang
wood	kayu	kaju	kaju
look, find	boya	hoja	boja
to make	bayu, (pareʼ)	haju	(buaʼ)

In Konjo languages, some initial b appears as /h/.

	Makassarese	Konjo	Selayar
to look, find	boya	hoja	boja
hot	bambang	hambang	bambang

== Lexical differences ==
	Makassarese			Coastal Konjo	Highland Konjo	Selayar
	Gowa (Standard)	Jeneponto	Bantaeng	Coastal Konjo	Highland Konjo	Selayar
to make	appareʼ		aʼbayu	aʼbaju	aʼbaju	aʼbuaʼ
to sit	ammempo	accidong		accidong	ammorong	attolong
hungry	cipuruʼ	paʼre		paʼre	paʼre	paʼre
rice field	tana	galung		galung	galung	galung
many, much	jai	loe		lohe	lohe	lohe
why	angngapa	angngura		angngura	anngura	angngura
friend	agang	urang		urang	urang	urang
water	jeʼneʼ		ere	ere	ere	jeʼneʼ
egg	bayao			bajao	tannoroʼ	tannoro
dog	kongkong		asu	asu	asu	asu
cat	miong	cammiʼ		cammiʼ, meong	meong	meong
leaf	lekoʼ		raung	raung	raung	taha
black	leʼleng			bolong	lotong	etang
white	keboʼ			pute	pute	pute
eight	sagantuju			karua	karua	karua
nine	salapang			salapang	salapang	kaʼassa
vegetable	gangang			utang	gangang	gangang
house	ballaʼ			ballaʼ, bola	bola	sapo
chicken	jangang			jangang	manuʼ	jangang

== See also ==
- Languages of Sulawesi
- Languages of Indonesia
