= Selayar language =

Language spoken in Indonesia

Selayar
- Basa Silajara
- Native to: Indonesia
- Region: Selayar Islands (South Sulawesi)
- Ethnicity: Selayar people
- Native speakers: 130,000 (2024)
- Language family: Austronesian: Malayo-Polynesian; South Sulawesi; Makassaric; Selayar

Language codes
- ISO 639-3: sly
- Glottolog: sela1260
- Map showing the distribution of the South Sulawesi languages in Sulawesi and Kalimantan. Selayar language is marked with number 9 in the Makassaric languages group.

Selayar (Basa Silajara) or Selayarese is a Malayo-Polynesian language spoken by approximately 130,000 people of the Selayar people on the Selayar Islands in the province of South Sulawesi, Indonesia. This language is egalitarian in its use, there are no levels of language, either rough or weak.

== Phonology ==
=== Vowels ===
	Front	Back
High	i	u
Mid	e	o
Low	a	

Vowels are lengthened when stressed and in an open syllable.

==== Nasalization ====
Nasalization extends from nasal consonants to the following vowels, continuing until blocked by an intonation break or a consonant other than a glottal stop:

[lamẽãĩʔĩ ãːsu] "A dog urinated on him."
[sassaʔ lamẽãĩʔĩ | ʔaːsu lataiːʔiʔi] "A lizard urinated on him, and a dog defecated on him."

=== Consonants ===
		Bilabial	Coronal	Palatal	Velar	Glottal
Nasal		m	n	ɲ	ŋ	
Plosive	prenasalized	ᵐb	ⁿd	ᶮɟ	ᵑɡ	
Plosive	voiced	b	d	ɟ	ɡ	
Plosive	voiceless	p	t̪		k	ʔ
Fricative			s			h
Lateral			l			
Rhotic			ɹ			

Of the coronals, the voiceless stop is dental, while the others are alveolar.

== Morphology ==
Selayarese intransitive verbs index pronominal arguments via an absolutive enclitic.

a'lumpa'=a
jump=1S
'I jump'

mangang=a
tired=1S
'I am tired'

In transitive verbs the less agent-like argument is indexed by the absolutive enclitic.

ku=isse'=i
1S=know=3S
'I know him'
