= List of regencies and districts of South Sulawesi =

The Districts of South Sulawesi are the administrative divisions of South Sulawesi, a province of Indonesia that is made up of 21 regencies (kabupaten) and 3 independent cities (kota), which are both in turn divided into districts called Kecamatan.

Five years after independence, the government issued Law No. 21 of 1950, which became the basis of the legal establishment for what was then the Sulawesi province. Ten years later, the government passed Law No. 47 of 1960 which endorsed the formation of the South/Southeast Sulawesi province. Four years after that, with Act No. 13 of 1964, the provinces of South Sulawesi and Southeast Sulawesi were separated. Forty years later, the South Sulawesi government was split into two, with the regencies of Majene, Mamasa, Mamuju, Pasangkayu, and Polewali Mandar having been separated off to form a new West Sulawesi province on 5 October 2004 under Act No. 26 of 2004.

== Regencies and cities ==
The South Sulawesi Province is composed of two major geographic regions (which have no administrative identity). The first - the southern half - consists of the southern peninsula itself and comprises sixteen regencies plus the independent cities of Makassar and Parepare. The second - the more mountainous and less densely populated northern half - now comprises five regencies plus the independent city of Palopo.

The area now within the northern region originally comprised just two regencies (Luwu and Tana Toraja), but three new regencies and a city have been created in this northern half since the establishment of the province. A new regency (Luwu Utara) was created on 20 April 1999 from the northern part of the existing Luwu Regency; a new city (Palopo) was created on 10 April 2002 from a further part of Luwu Regency; and on 25 February 2003 another regency (Luwu Timur) was formed from the eastern half of the Luwu Utara Regency. Following the splitting away of part (five regencies) of the original province to form a separate West Sulawesi Province in 2004, the remaining South Sulawesi Province was divided into twenty regencies (kabupaten) and three independent cities (kota), but a twenty-first regency (Toraja Utara) was formed on 24 June 2008 from the northern half of Tana Toraja Regency.

These regencies and cities are listed below with their areas and their populations as of the 2010 Census and 2020 Census, together with the official estimates as at mid 2025. The table also includes the number of districts (kecamatan) in each regency or city, its administrative capital and its Human Development Index for 2018.

Kode Wilayah	Name of City or Regency	Area in km^{2}	Pop'n Census 2000	Pop'n Census 2010	Pop'n Census 2020	Pop'n Estimate mid 2025	No. of districts	Capital	HDI 2018 Estimates
73.01	Selayar Islands Regency (Kepulauan Selayar)	1,163.38	103,596	122,055	137,071	144,230	11	Benteng	0.660 (Medium)
73.02	Bulukumba Regency	1,175.56	352,419	394,560	437,607	459,000	10	Bulukumba	0.677 (Medium)
73.03	Bantaeng Regency	390.95	158,632	176,699	196,716	207,650	8	Bantaeng	0.677 (Medium)
73.04	Jeneponto Regency	795.13	317,588	342,700	401,610	423,370	11	Bontosunggu	0.633 (Medium)
73.05	Takalar Regency	553.21	229,718	269,603	300,853	321,140	9	Pattallassang	0.660 (Medium)
73.06	Gowa Regency	1,812.99	512,876	652,941	765,836	826,960	18	Sungguminasa	0.688 (Medium)
73.07	Sinjai Regency	865.70	204,385	228,879	259,478	273,310	9	Sinjai	0.662 (Medium)
73.08	Bone Regency	4,568.03	648,089	717,682	801,775	837,100	27	Watampone	0.650 (Medium)
73.09	Maros Regency	1,443.79	272,116	319,002	391,774	419,150	14	Turikale	0.689 (Medium)
73.10	Pangkajene and Islands Regency (Pangkajene Dan Kepulauan, or "PanKep")	883.55	263,565	305,737	345,775	362,690	13	Pangkajene	0.677 (Medium)
73.11	Barru Regency	1,201.32	151,085	165,983	184,452	190,470	7	Barru	0.700 (High)
73.12	Soppeng Regency	1,385.55	219,505	223,826	235,167	240,420	8	Watansoppeng	0.676 (Medium)
73.13	Wajo Regency	2,505.49	357,720	385,109	379,079	391,460	14	Sengkang	0.685 (Medium)
73.14	Sidenreng Rappang Regency (or "SidRap")	1,935.33	238,419	271,911	327,920	333,520	11	Pangkajene; Sidenreng	0.706 (High)
73.15	Pinrang Regency	1,895.01	310,833	351,118	403,994	429,890	12	Pinrang	0.706 (High)
73.16	Enrekang Regency	1,806.82	166,307	190,248	225,172	241,670	12	Enrekang	0.721 (High)
73.71	Makassar (City)	177.17	1,130,384	1,338,663	1,423,877	1,473,910	15	Makassar	0.817 (Very High)
73.72	Parepare (City)	89.63	108,258	129,262	151,454	163,400	4	Parepare	0.771 (High)
73	Southern half	24,648.52	5,936,633	6,585,978	7,361,680	7,739,340	213		
73.17	Luwu Regency	2,901.70	398,131	332,482	365,608	389,260	22	Belopa	0.696 (Medium)
73.18	Tana Toraja Regency	2,043.62	392,726	221,081	280,794	295,350	19	Makale	0.676 (Medium)
73.22	North Luwu Regency (Luwu Utara)	7,422.26	431,680	287,472	322,919	341,520	12	Masamba	0.687 (Medium)
73.24	East Luwu Regency (Luwu Timur)	6,745.77	^{(a)}	243,069	296,741	316,890	11	Malili	0.721(High)
73.27	North Toraja Regency (Toraja Utara)	1,289.13	^{(b)}	216,762	261,086	282,240	21	Rantepao	0.684 (Medium)
73.73	Palopo (City)	272.89	^{(c)}	147,932	184,681	198,530	9	Palopo	0.773 (High)
73	Northern half	20,675.37	1,222,537	1,448,798	1,711,829	1,823,790	94		
73	Province Totals	45,323.89	7,159,170	8,034,776	9,073,509	9,563,130	307	Makassar	0.709 (High)

Notes: (a) The 2000 Census population for East Luwu Regency is included in the figure for North Luwu Regency, from which it was formed on 25 February 2003 (under Law No.7 of 2003).
(b) The 2000 Census population for North Toraja Regency is included in the figure for Tana Toraja Regency, from which it was formed on 26 November 2008 (under Law No.28 of 2008, following the publication of the report of Commission President Yudhoyono, numbered R.68/Pres/12/2007 on 10 December 2007, regarding the expansion of the twelve original districts and cities).
(c) The 2000 Census population for Palopo city is included in the figure for Luwu Regency, from which it was formed on 10 April 2002 (under Law No.11 of 2002).

***

== Districts ==
The 307 districts (kecamatan) of South Sulawesi are as follows, listed with the regencies or cities in which they are situated:

- Ajangale, Bone
- Alla Timur, Enrekang
- Alla, Sulawesi Enrekang
- Amali, Sulawesi, Bone
- Anggeraja Timur, Enrekang
- Anggeraja, Enrekang
- Angkona, Luwu Timur
- Arungkeke, Jeneponto
- Awan Rante Karua, Toraja Utara
- Awangpone, Bone
- Bacukiki, Pare-Pare
- Baebunta, Luwu Utara
- Bajeng, Gowa
- Bajo, Sulawesi, Luwu
- Balocci, Kepulauan Pangkajene
- Balusu, Barru
- Balusu, Toraja Utara
- Bangkala Barat, Jeneponto
- Bangkala, Jeneponto
- Bangkelekila, Toraja Utara
- Bantaeng, Bantaeng
- Bantimurung, Maros
- Baraka, Enrekang
- Baranti, Sidenreng Rappang
- Barebbo, Bone
- Barombong, Gowa
- Barru, Barru
- Baruppu, Toraja Utara
- Bassesangtempe, Luwu
- Batang, Jeneponto
- Batulappa, Pinrang
- Buki, Selayar (link to Indonesian article)
- Belawa, Sulawesi, Wajo
- Belopa, Luwu
- Bengo, Sulawesi, Bone
- Benteng, Selayar (link to Indonesian language article)
- Binamu, Jeneponto
- Biring Kanaya, Makassar
- Biringbulu, Gowa
- Bissappu, Bantaeng
- Bituang, Tana Toraja
- Bola, Indonesia, Wajo
- Bone-Bone, Luwu Utara
- Bonggakaradeng, Tana Toraja
- Bontobahari
- Bontoala, Makassar
- Bontocani, Bone
- Bontoharu, Selayar
- Bontomanai, Selayar
- Bontomarannu, Gowa
- Bontomatene, Selayar
- Bontonompo, Gowa
- Bontoramba, Jeneponto
- Bontosikuyu, Selayar
- Bontotiro, Bulukumba
- Bua Ponrang, Luwu
- Bua, Indonesia, Luwu
- Bulukumpa, Bulukumba
- Bulupoddo, Sinjai
- Bungaya, Gowa
- Bungoro, Kepulauan Pangkajene
- Buntao Rantebua, Tana Toraja
- Buntao, Toraja Utara
- Burau, Luwu Timur
- Camba, Sulawesi, Maros
- Cempa, Pinrang
- Cenrana, Bone
- Cenrana, Maros
- Cina, Bone
- Donri Donri, Soppeng
- Dua Boccoe, Bone
- Duampanua, Pinrang
- Duapitue, Sidenreng Rappang
- Enrekang Selatan, Enrekang
- Enrekang, Enrekang
- Eremerasa, Bantaeng
- Galesong Selatan, Takalar
- Galesong Utara, Takalar
- Ganra, Soppeng
- Gantarang, Bulukumba
- Gantarangkeke, Bantaeng
- Gilireng, Wajo
- Hero Lange-Lange, Bulukumba
- Kahu, Bone
- Kajang
- Kajuara, Bone
- Kalukuang Masalima, Kepulauan Pangkajene
- Kamanre, Luwu
- Kapala Pitu, Toraja Utara
- Keera, Wajo
- Kelara, Jeneponto
- Kesu, Toraja Utara
- Kindang, Bulukumba
- Kulo, Sidenreng Rappang
- Labakkang, Kepulauan Pangkajene
- Lalabata, Soppeng
- Lamasi, Luwu
- Lamuru, Bone
- Lanrisang, Pinrang
- Lappariaja, Bone
- Larompong
- Laronpong Selatan, Luwu
- Latimojong, Luwu
- Lau, Maros
- Lembang, Pinrang
- Libureng, Bone
- Lili Riaja, Soppeng
- Lili Rilau, Soppeng
- Limbong, Luwu Utara
- Liukang Tangaya, Kepulauan Pangkajene
- Liukang Tupabbiring, Kepulauan Pangkajene
- Ma'Rang, Kepulauan Pangkajene
- Maiwa Atas, Enrekang
- Maiwa, Enrekang
- Majauleng, Wajo
- Makale, Tana Toraja
- Makassar, Makassar
- Malangke Barat, Luwu Utara
- Malangke, Luwu Utara
- Malili, Luwu Timur
- Mallawa, Maros
- Mallusetasi, Barru
- Mamajang, Makassar
- Mandai, Maros
- Mandalle, Kepulauan Pangkajene
- Mangara Bombang, Takalar
- Manggala, Makassar
- Mangkutana, Luwu Timur
- Maniang Pajo, Wajo
- Mappakasunggu, Takalar
- Mappedeceng, Luwu Utara
- Mare, Bone
- Mario Riawa, Soppeng
- Mario Riwawo, Soppeng
- Mariso, Makassar
- Maritengngae, Sidenreng Rappang
- Maros Baru, Maros
- Maros Utara, Maros
- Marusu, Maros
- Masamba
- Mattiro Bulu, Pinrang
- Mattirosompe, Pinrang
- Mengkendek, Tana Toraja
- Minasa Te'ne, Kepulauan Pangkajene
- Moncongloe, Maros
- Nanggala, Toraja Utara
- Nuha, Luwu Timur
- Pajukukang, Bantaeng
- Palakka, Bone
- Paleteang, Pinrang
- Pallangga, Gowa
- Panakkukang, Makassar
- Panca Lautang, Sidenreng Rappang
- Panca Rijang, Sidenreng Rappang
- Pangkajene, Kepulauan Pangkajene
- Parangloe, Gowa
- Pasilambena, Selayar
- Pasimarannu, Selayar
- Pasimasunggu, Selayar
- Pasimasunggu Timur, Selayar
- Patallassang, Takalar
- Patampanua, Pinrang
- Patimpeng, Bone
- Penrang, Wajo
- Pitu Riase, Sidenreng Rappang
- Pitu Riawa, Sidenreng Rappang
- Pitumpanua
- Polobangkeng Selatan, Takalar
- Polobangkeng Utara, Takalar
- Poncang, Luwu
- Ponre, Bone
- Pujananting, Barru
- Pulau Sembilan, Sinjai
- Rampi, Luwu Utara
- Rantebua, Toraja Utara
- Rantepao, Toraja Utara
- Rantetayo, Tana Toraja
- Rappocini, Makassar
- Riau Ale, Bulukumba
- Rindingalo, Toraja Utara
- Sa'dan, Toraja Utara
- Sabbang Paru, Wajo
- Sabbang, Luwu Utara
- Sajoanging, Wajo
- Salomekko, Bone
- Saluputti, Tana Toraja
- Sangalla, Tana Toraja
- Sanggalangi, Toraja Utara
- Segeri, Kepulauan Pangkajene
- Seko, Luwu Utara
- Sesean Suloara, Toraja Utara
- Sesean, Toraja Utara
- Sibulue, Bone
- Sidenreng, Sidenreng Rappang
- Simbang, Maros
- Simbuang, Tana Toraja
- Sinjai Barat, Sinjai
- Sinjai Borong, Sinjai
- Sinjai Selatan, Sinjai
- Sinjai Tengah, Sinjai
- Sinjai Timur, Sinjai
- Sinjai Utara, Sinjai
- Sinoa, Bantaeng
- Somba Opu, Gowa
- Sopai, Toraja Utara
- Soppeng Riaja, Barru
- Soreang, Pare-Pare
- Sukamaju, Luwu Utara
- Suli, Luwu
- Suppa, Pinrang
- Takabonerate, Selayar
- Takkalalla, Wajo
- Tallinglipu Dende' Piongan Napo, Toraja Utara
- Tallo, Makassar
- Tamalanrea, Makassar
- Tamalatea, Jeneponto
- Tana Sitolo, Wajo
- Tanete Riaja, Barru
- Tanete Riattang Barat, Bone
- Tanete Riattang Timur, Bone
- Tanete Riattang, Bone
- Tanete Rilau, Barru
- Tanralili, Maros
- Tellu Limpoe, Bone
- Tellu Limpoe, Sinjai
- Tellu Siattinge, Bone
- Tellulimpo E, Sidenreng Rappang
- Telluwanua, Palopo
- Tempe, Wajo
- Tikala, Toraja Utara
- Tinggimoncong, Gowa
- Tiroang, Pinrang
- Tombolo Pao, Gowa
- Tomoni, Luwu Timur
- Tompobulu, Bantaeng
- Tompobulu, Gowa
- Tompu Bulu, Maros
- Tondon, Toraja Utara
- Tondong Talasa, Kepulauan Pangkajene
- Tonra, Bone
- Towuti, Luwu Timur
- Turatea, Jeneponto
- Turikale, Maros
- Ujung Bulu, Bulukumba
- Ujung Loe, Bulukumba
- Ujung Pandang, Makassar
- Ujung Tanah, Makassar
- Ujung, Pare-Pare
- Ulaweng, Bone
- Uluere, Bantaeng
- Wajo, Makassar
- Walenrang, Luwu
- Wara Selatan, Palopo
- Wara, Palopo
- Watang Pulu, Sidenreng Rappang
- Watang Sawitto, Pinrang
- Wotu, Luwu Timur
