= Selayar =

Selayar may refer to:

- Selayar Islands
- Selayar Island
- Selayar language
- Selayar Islands Regency
- Selayar Island, Lingga Archipelago, Riau Islands Province, Indonesia
