= H. Aroeppala Airport =

Airport in Kepulauan Selayar, Indonesia

H. Aroeppala Airport Bandar Udara H. Aroeppala
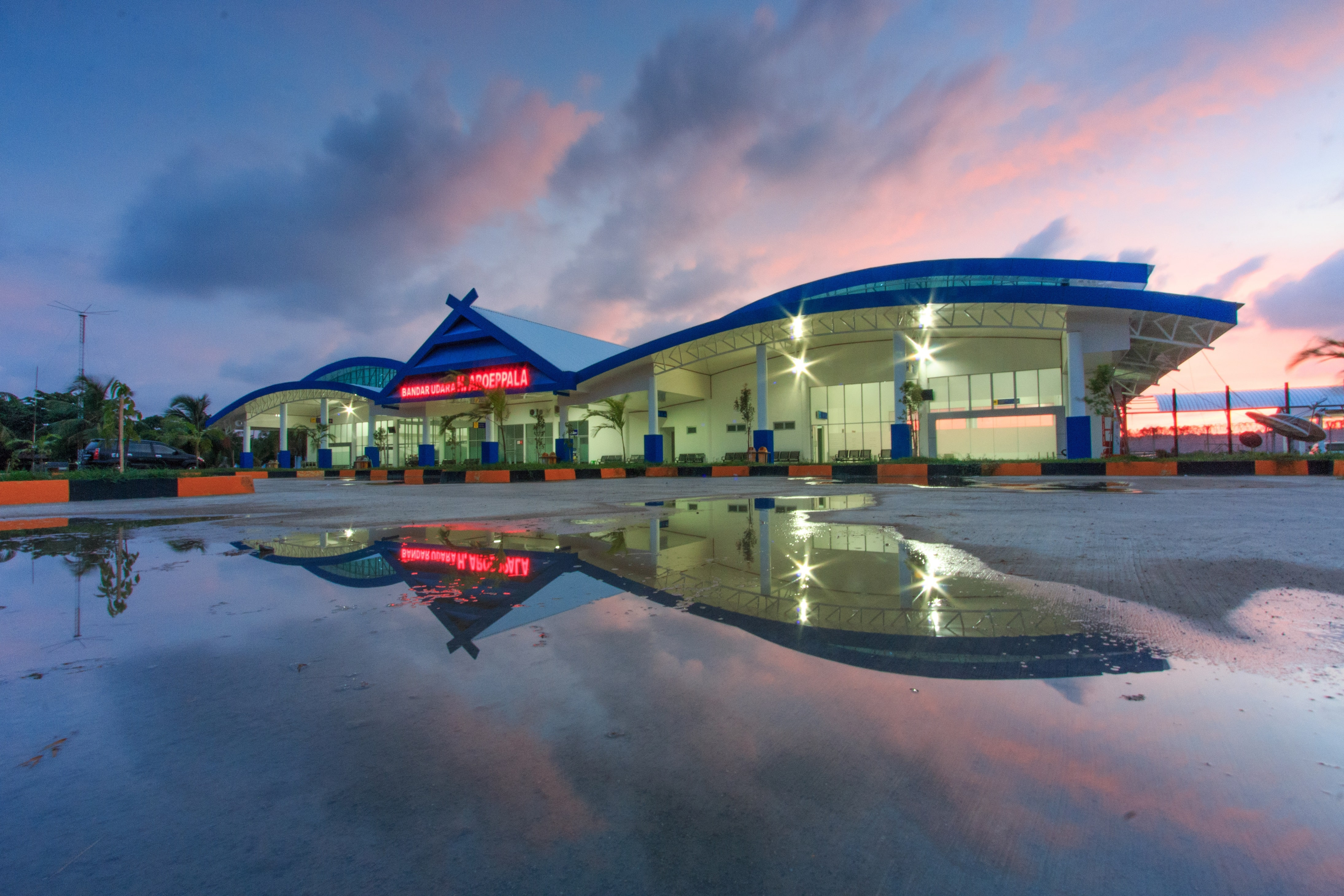
- IATA: KSR; ICAO: WAWH

Summary
- Airport type: Public
- Owner: Government of Indonesia
- Operator: Directorate General of Civil Aviation
- Serves: Selayar Islands
- Location: Bontoharu District, Selayar Islands Regency, South Sulawesi, Sulawesi, Indonesia
- Time zone: WITA (UTC+08:00)
- Elevation AMSL: 4 m (13 ft)
- Coordinates: 06°10′43″S 120°26′14″E

Map
- Location in Sulawesi Location in Indonesia

Runways
| Direction | Length | | Surface |
| Direction | m | ft | Surface |
|---|---|---|---|
| 16/34 | 1,950 | 6,398 | Asphalt |

Statistics (2024)
- Passengers: 24 (▼99.1%)
- Cargo (tonnes): N/A
- Aircraft movements: 2 (▼99.1%)
- Source: DGCA

H. Aroeppala Airport (IATA: KSR, ICAO: WAWH) is a domestic regional airport serving the Selayar Islands in South Sulawesi, Indonesia. The airport is named after Haji Aroeppala, a Selayarese politician and bureaucrat who served as Mayor of Makassar from 1960 to 1965. It is located in Bontoharu District, approximately 7 km (4.3 mi) from Benteng, the administrative seat of the Selayar Islands Regency. The airport serves as the main gateway by air to the Selayar Islands and surrounding areas, as well as the nearby Taka Bonerate National Park. As of 2026, flight services at the airport remain very limited, with only one airline, FlyJaya, operating scheduled flights to Makassar, the provincial capital of South Sulawesi. In the past, the airport was also served by airlines such as Aviastar, Citilink, Garuda Indonesia and Wings Air, all of which have since discontinued their services to Selayar.

== History ==
=== Construction and early history ===
Before the airport was constructed, Selayar could only be reached by ferry from mainland Sulawesi, with the journey from Bira Port in Bulukumba Regency taking approximately 2.5 hours. Travel from Makassar, the provincial capital of South Sulawesi, to Bira by road required an additional four to five hours. During periods of bad weather, ferry services may be suspended at short notice, as wave heights in the waters around Selayar can reach 4–5 m. The lengthy journey prompted the government to consider constructing an airport on Selayar to improve transportation access and connectivity to the region.

A proposal to construct a pioneer airport serving Selayar Island was first considered in the late 1990s by Akib Patta, the then-Regent of the Selayar Islands Regency. Following the planning phase, construction of the airport began in 1997 and was completed in 2000. It was inaugurated by then-Minister of Transportation Agum Gumelar on 17 September 2000, coinciding with National Development Day. When the airport began operations, it had a runway measuring only 900 m in length, which limited it to accommodating small aircraft, up to the size of the CASA C-212 Aviocar. One of the first airlines to operate scheduled services to the airport was Dirgantara Air Service (DAS), which operated three weekly flights to Makassar using Cessna aircraft.

By 2008, the runway had been extended to 1,600 m. Between 2009 and 2010, major development of the airport began, including the construction of a new passenger terminal and a further runway extension to 1,800 m. The extension enabled the airport to accommodate aircraft such as the Fokker 100. The airport's status was also upgraded from a pioneer airport to a domestic airport. At the time, plans were also being considered to introduce direct flights to Surabaya and Jakarta. The proposal was raised again in 2019 by the South Sulawesi provincial government, which advocated for the introduction of direct flights to Jakarta to attract visitors to the nearby Taka Bonerate National Park.

On 21 September 2011, Sabang Merauke Raya Air Charter (SMAC) launched the Makassar–Selayar–Bima route using the CASA C-212. However, the route was short-lived and was discontinued in early 2012 due to the poor condition of the aircraft, prompting the Ministry of Transportation to prohibit the airline from operating the route. The route was subsequently taken over by Aviastar in February 2013, which operated one weekly flight. On 27 March 2013, Merpati Nusantara Airlines launched the Makassar–Selayar route using the Xi'an MA60. However, this route was also short-lived, as the airline ceased operations on February 2014. The route was subsequently resumed by Wings Air, which began operating three weekly flights on 4 June 2014 using ATR 72 aircraft. At the time, Wings Air was also reportedly interested in launching a new route connecting Selayar with Labuan Bajo in East Nusa Tenggara.

=== Contemporary history ===
Between 2015 and 2020, additional airlines began serving the airport. Susi Air launched pioneer routes to Bima and Kendari in May 2017. Garuda Indonesia commenced flights from Makassar to Selayar on 26 March 2018, operating ATR 72-600 aircraft. The route was terminated on 24 January 2019. Citilink subsequently took over the route on 17 September 2020. TransNusa also operated the Makassar–Selayar route from 1 July 2018 until 19 December 2019.

During the COVID-19 pandemic, the airport was closed in June 2021 due to low passenger demand and stringent regulations governing air travel. Commercial services resumed in October of the same year, with Citilink and Wings Air resuming flights to Makassar. All commercial flights ceased again in December 2023, and the airport did not serve any commercial flights throughout 2024. Commercial services resumed on 20 March 2025, when Wings Air restarted flights to the airport. The service once again lasted only a few months before being discontinued in May due to low passenger occupancy. In September 2025, FlyJaya launched the Makassar–Selayar route using ATR 72-500 aircraft, with fares subsidized by the South Sulawesi provincial government.

The airport's development has been marred by allegations of corruption. The project was reportedly carried out improperly, resulting in construction work that deviated from the original plans and required standards. In October 2021, investigators identified significant potential state losses and named two suspects in connection with the case. Both were suspected of violating regulations in the construction of the project to bring the airport's runway strip into compliance with the required standards. The project was valued at Rp11 billion and was funded through the 2018 state budget (APBN) under the Ministry of Transportation. Investigators initially estimated that the faulty work had the potential to cause state losses of approximately Rp8.2 billion.

== Facilities and development ==
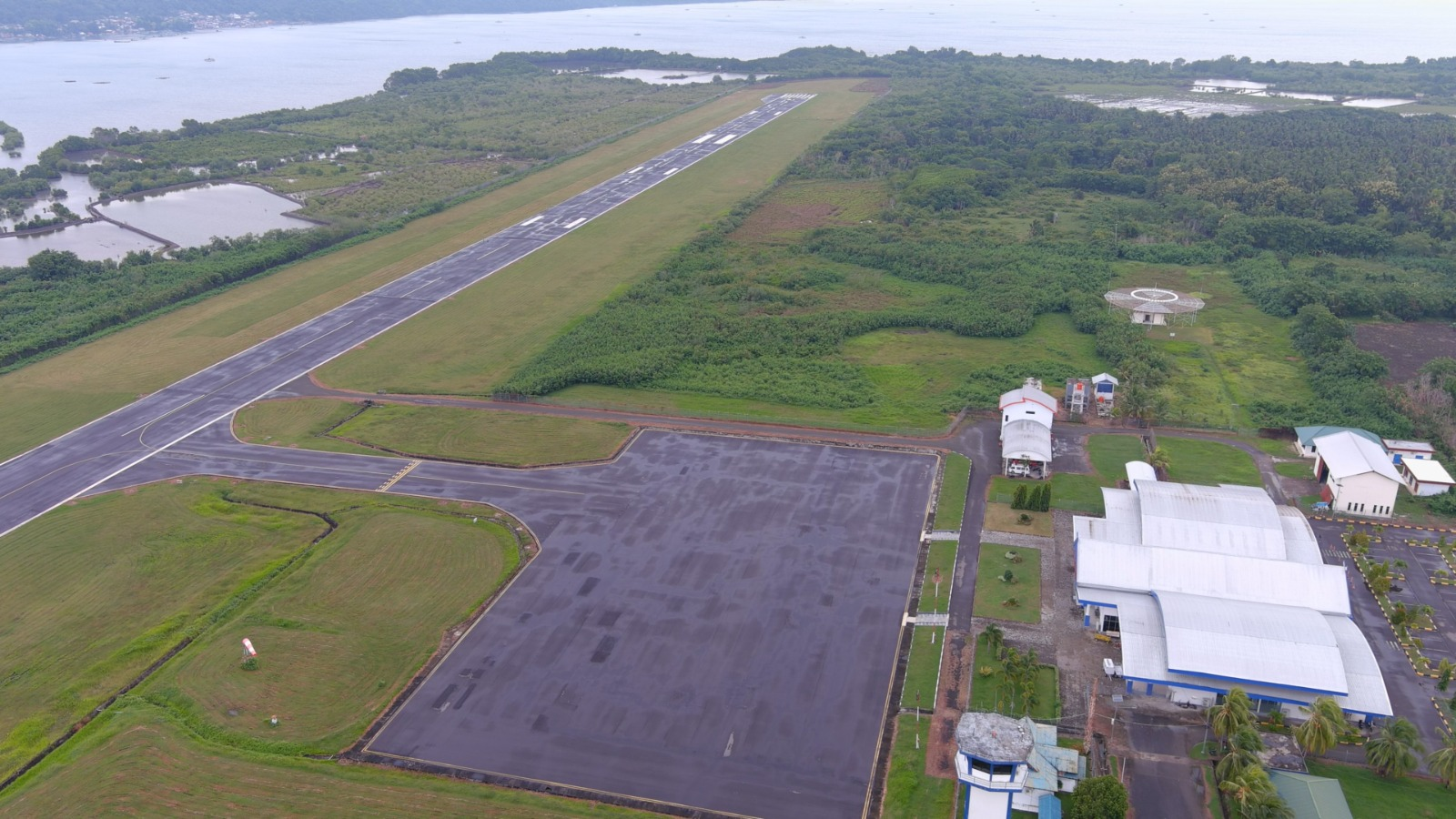
Aerial view of H. Aroeppala Airport

The airport has a 2,268 m² passenger terminal with an annual capacity of up to 10,000 passengers, while its boarding gate can accommodate up to 200 passengers at a time. The terminal was renovated in 2016 and completed and inaugurated by then-President Joko Widodo in December 2018, as part of a ceremony marking the inauguration of five other airport terminals in Sulawesi. It is equipped with basic passenger facilities, including check-in counters, departure gates, baggage carousels in the arrivals area, a smoking room, a lactation room, a prayer room, a VIP room, four toilets, including an accessible toilet, a canteen, and an information desk. The airport is also equipped with a mosque located within the passenger terminal complex. In addition to the passenger terminal, the airport is equipped with a 360 m² administrative building, a 298 m² Aircraft Rescue and Fire Fighting (PKP-PK) building, and a 4,100 m² parking area.

On the landside, the airport has a 1,950 m × 30 m runway capable of accommodating aircraft such as the ATR 72 and Fokker 100. Proposals have been discussed to extend the runway to 2,400 m, which would allow the airport to accommodate narrow-body aircraft such as the Boeing 737 and Airbus A320. The proposed extension is planned to be included in the National Strategic Projects (PSN) program and is intended to support Selayar's development as a Special Economic Zone (SEZ) in South Sulawesi. As of 2021, the process remained focused on plans to transfer ownership of the land from the provincial government to the central government to facilitate the proposed runway extension. The runway is also equipped with a Runway End Safety Area (RESA) measuring 90 m × 60 m. In addition, the airport has a single taxiway measuring 75 m × 20 m and an aircraft apron measuring 70 m × 128.6 m.

== Airlines and destinations ==
| Airlines | Destinations |
|---|---|
| FlyJaya | Makassar (resumes 4 November 2026) |

== Statistics ==
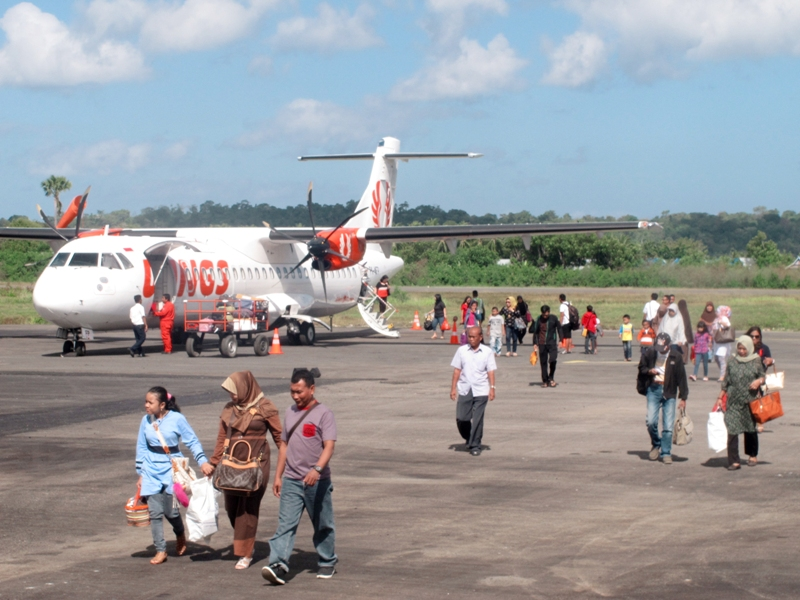
A Wings Air ATR 72 at H. Aroeppala Airport

Annual passenger numbers and aircraft statistics
| Year | Passengers handled | Passenger % change | Cargo (tonnes) | Cargo % change | Aircraft movements | Aircraft % change |
|---|---|---|---|---|---|---|
| 2006 | N/A | Steady | N/A | Steady | N/A | Steady |
| 2007 | 2,145 | Steady | N/A | Steady | 136 | Steady |
| 2008 | 1,353 | ▼36.9 | N/A | Steady | 110 | ▼19.1 |
| 2009 | 2,264 | ▲67.3 | 3.61 | Steady | 140 | ▲27.3 |
| 2010 | 1,560 | ▼31.1 | N/A | Steady | 114 | ▼18.6 |
| 2011 | 6,090 | ▲290.4 | 0.08 | Steady | 463 | ▲306.1 |
| 2012 | 12,767 | ▲109.6 | N/A | Steady | 608 | ▲31.3 |
| 2013 | 3,454 | ▼72.9 | N/A | Steady | 238 | ▼60.9 |
| 2014 | 16,849 | ▲387.8 | 32.17 | Steady | 550 | ▲131.1 |
| 2015 | 17,811 | ▲5.7 | 2.30 | ▼92.9 | 1,155 | ▲110.0 |
| 2016 | 24,449 | ▲37.3 | N/A | Steady | 828 | ▼28.3 |
| 2017 | 41,222 | ▲68.6 | N/A | Steady | 924 | ▲11.6 |
| 2018 | 69,243 | ▲68.0 | N/A | Steady | 1,345 | ▲45.6 |
| 2019 | 64,791 | ▼6.4 | N/A | Steady | 1,358 | ▲1.0 |
| 2020 | 25,047 | ▼61.3 | N/A | Steady | 531 | ▼60.9 |
| 2021 | 9,699 | ▼61.3 | N/A | Steady | 290 | ▼45.4 |
| 2022 | 4,624 | ▼52.3 | N/A | Steady | 108 | ▼62.8 |
| 2023 | 2,659 | ▼42.5 | N/A | Steady | 216 | ▲100.0 |
| 2024 | 24 | ▼99.1 | N/A | Steady | 2 | ▼99.1 |
^{Source: DGCA, BPS}
