= Sengkang (disambiguation) =

Sengkang is an urban planning area and residential district in Singapore.

Sengkang may also refer to:

- Sengkang, Indonesia, a town in South Sulawesi, the capital of Wajo Regency
- Sengkang, Johor, a town in Kulai district, Johor, Malaysia
