= Bonerate =

Bonerate may be,

- Pulau Bonerate
- Bonerate people
- Bonerate language

== See also ==
- Taka Bonerate Islands
