= Aethalida owadai =

Scientific classification
- Kingdom: Animalia
- Phylum: Arthropoda
- Clade: Pancrustacea
- Class: Insecta
- Order: Lepidoptera
- Superfamily: Noctuoidea
- Family: Erebidae
- Subfamily: Arctiinae
- Genus: Aethalida
- Species: A. owadai

Binomial name
- Aethalida owadai Dubatolov & Kishida, 2005

Species of moth

Aethalida owadai is a moth of the family Erebidae. It was described by Vladimir Viktorovitch Dubatolov and Yasunori Kishida in 2005. It is found on Selayar Island and Flores in Indonesia.

== Subspecies ==
- Aethalida owadai owadai Dubatolov & Kishida, 2005 (Indonesia: Selayar Island)
- Aethalida owadai floresiensis Spitsyn & I. Bolotov, 2016 (Indonesia: Flores)
