= Aethalida whiteheadi =

Scientific classification
- Domain: Eukaryota
- Kingdom: Animalia
- Phylum: Arthropoda
- Class: Insecta
- Order: Lepidoptera
- Superfamily: Noctuoidea
- Family: Erebidae
- Subfamily: Arctiinae
- Genus: Aethalida
- Species: A. whiteheadi

Binomial name
- Aethalida whiteheadi (Rothschild, 1910)

Synonyms
- Pericallia whiteheadi Rothschild, 1910

Species of moth

Aethalida whiteheadi is a moth of the family Erebidae. It was described by Walter Rothschild in 1910. It is found on Luzon and Palawan in the Philippines. The habitat consists of clearings in primary and secondary forests at altitudes ranging from 100 to 950 meters.

Adults have been recorded on wing in March, September and December.

== Taxonomy ==
The species was formerly treated as a synonym of Aethalida dora.
