= Taka Bonerate National Park =

National park

- IUCN category II (national park)
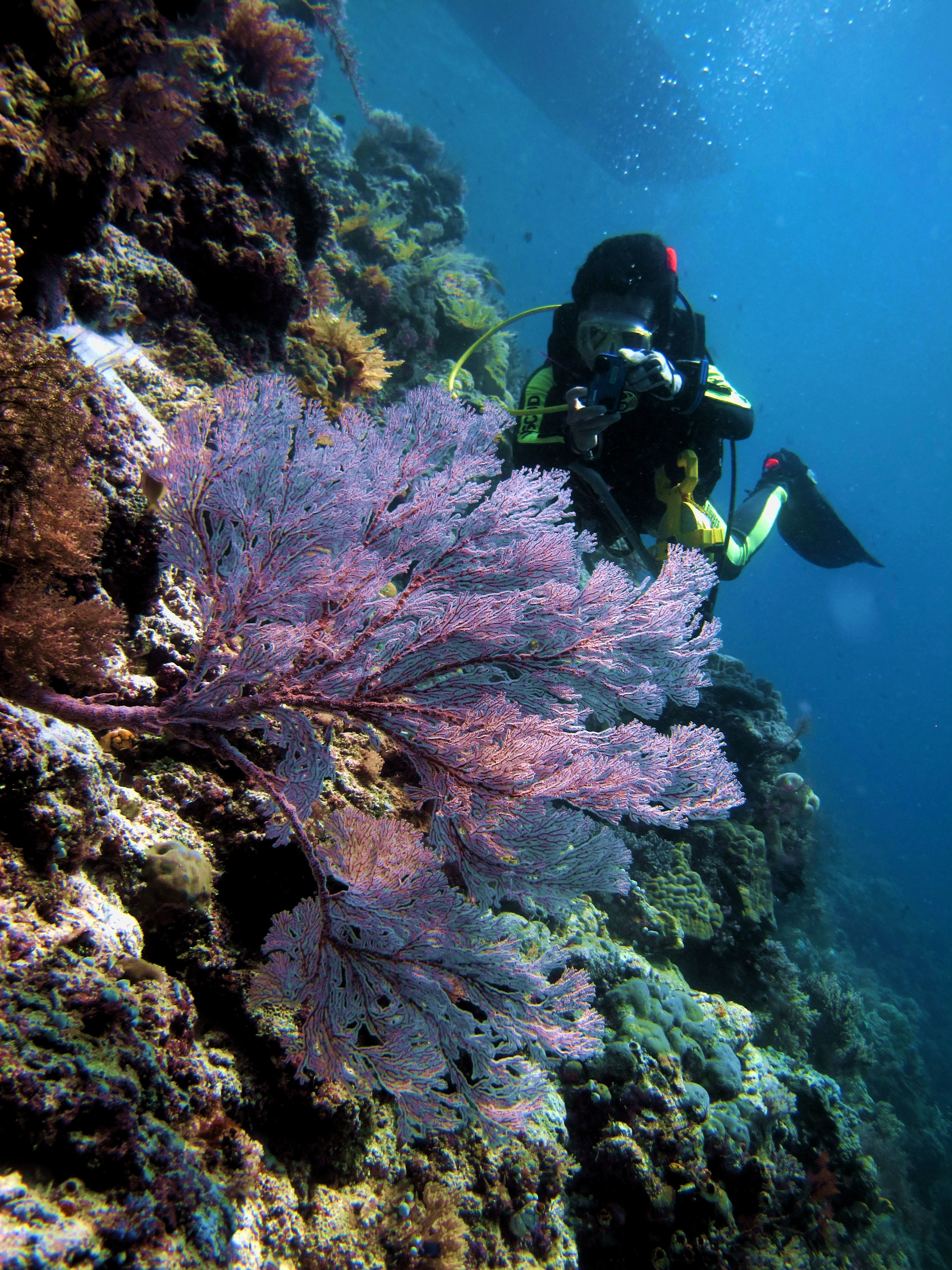
- Latondu Island in Taka Bonerate NP

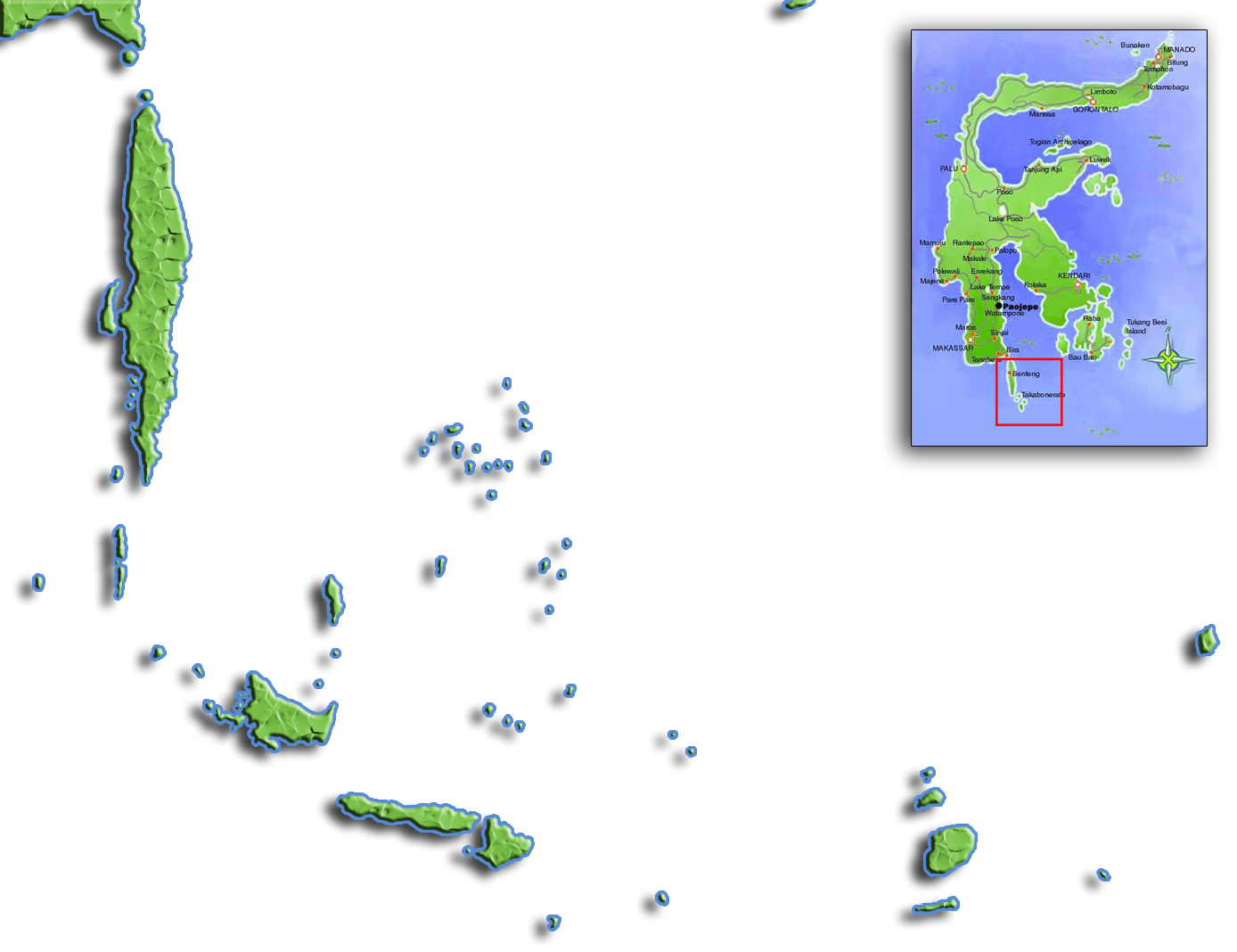
- Location within Selayar Islands Regency Location within Sulawesi Location within Indonesia
- Location: Selayar Islands Regency, South Sulawesi, Indonesia
- Nearest city: Benteng
- Coordinates: 6°41′S 121°9′E
- Area: 5,307 km^{2} (2,049 sq mi)
- Established: 1992
- Governing body: Ministry of Forestry

Taka Bonerate National Park is a marine park which includes the Takabonerate atoll islands, located in the Flores Sea, south of Sulawesi island of Indonesia.

The area, which consists of the atoll islands and surrounding marine area was granted national park protection status in 1992.

In 2015 the Taka Bone Rate National Park has been included in the UNESCO World Network of Biosphere Reserves.

== Geography ==
Taka Bone Rate is administered as part of Selayar Regency, South Sulawesi province. The atoll is located in Flores Sea, southeast off the coast from the southern "arms" of Sulawesi Island and to the east of Selayar Island. It is located west of Wakatobi islands and far north of Komodo island across the Flores Sea. The nearest large city is Makassar, from where it can be reached in about 16 hours by boat.

With an area of 530,765 hectares which has an atoll expanse of 220,000 hectares, Taka Bone Rate meaning 'coral islands over sand' is the biggest atoll in Indonesia, and Southeast Asia, and the third biggest in the world after Kwajalein Atoll and Suvadiva.

The atoll consists of separate table reefs enclosing a lagoon filled with massive reefs. The atoll has 21 islands, eight of which are inhabited. There are 15 islands for diving and snorkeling. The main island is Tinabo Island with 1.500x500 meters square and white smooth sandy beach as baby powder. Tinabo Island is 4 hours sail by rental boat from Benteng in Selayar Island. The best month to visit is March till mid-May and mid-September till December.

== Demography ==
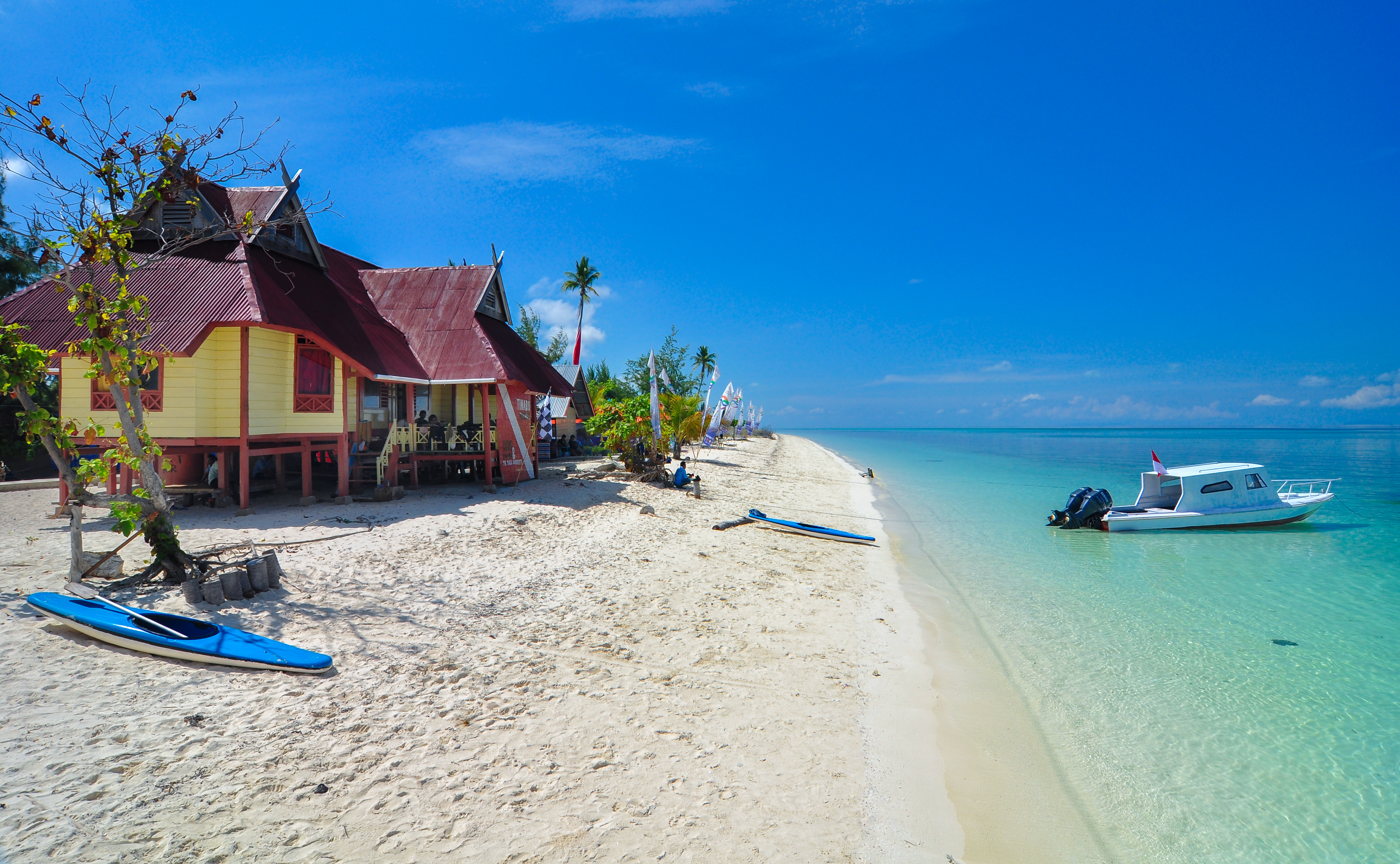
Tourist area in Taka Bonerate National Park

The natives of the atoll are the Bonerate people. They traditionally trade for fishery sea products from the Bajau in exchange for freshwater and other land supply. The Bonerate are predominantly Muslim, although with strong elements of traditional beliefs.

They speak the Bonerate language, a Celebic language, and like most languages of Indonesia part of the greater Austronesian languages. Their closest linguistic relations is with people in the neighbouring Buton, Wakatobi and Muna Island in Southeast Sulawesi. Most also speak Indonesian.

== Ecology ==
The atoll is of major ecological importance, with rich marine and bird life. The national park is considered to contain some of the world's highest marine biodiversity. According to the Indonesian Department of Forestry the atoll has 261 species of coral, 295 species of coral fish, 244 species of mollusc and other species such as hawksbill turtle (Eretmochelys imbricata), Pacific ridley turtle (Lepidochelys olivacea), and green turtle (Chelonia mydas).
