= Sabang Merauke Raya Air Charter =

IATA	ICAO	Call sign
-	SMC	SAMER
- Founded: 1969
- Ceased operations: 2011
- Hubs: Polonia International Airport
- Parent company: Merukh Enterprises
- Headquarters: Medan, Indonesia
- Website: http://smaccharter.weebly.com/

Sabang Merauke Raya Air Charter (SMAC) was an airline based in Medan, North Sumatra, Indonesia. It operated scheduled and chartered domestic passenger and cargo services, as well as pleasure and business flights. Its main base was Polonia International Airport, Medan. SMAC was listed in category 2 by the Indonesian Civil Aviation Authority for airline safety quality. The airline ceased operations in 2011.

== History ==
The airline started operating in 1969 as a joint venture partnership with Malaysian Air Charter (MAC). In 1972, it split from MAC and adopted the name Sabang Merauke Raya Air Charter (SMAC), which would remain its official name until the company ceased to exist. SMAC was fully owned by Merukh Enterprises.

In 2011, the Indonesian Directorate General of Civil Aviation (DGAC) suspended SMAC's air operating certificate (AOC) due to the fatal accident of a CASA NC-212 on Bintan Island. The plane crashed during a test flight, and all five passengers on board died.

A preliminary investigation into the accident found that:

1. The pilot in command was not qualified for that type of flight.
2. No permission was obtained to carry out a test flight.
3. A spare engine was carried on board during the flight.

The airline ended operations that same year.

== Fleet ==
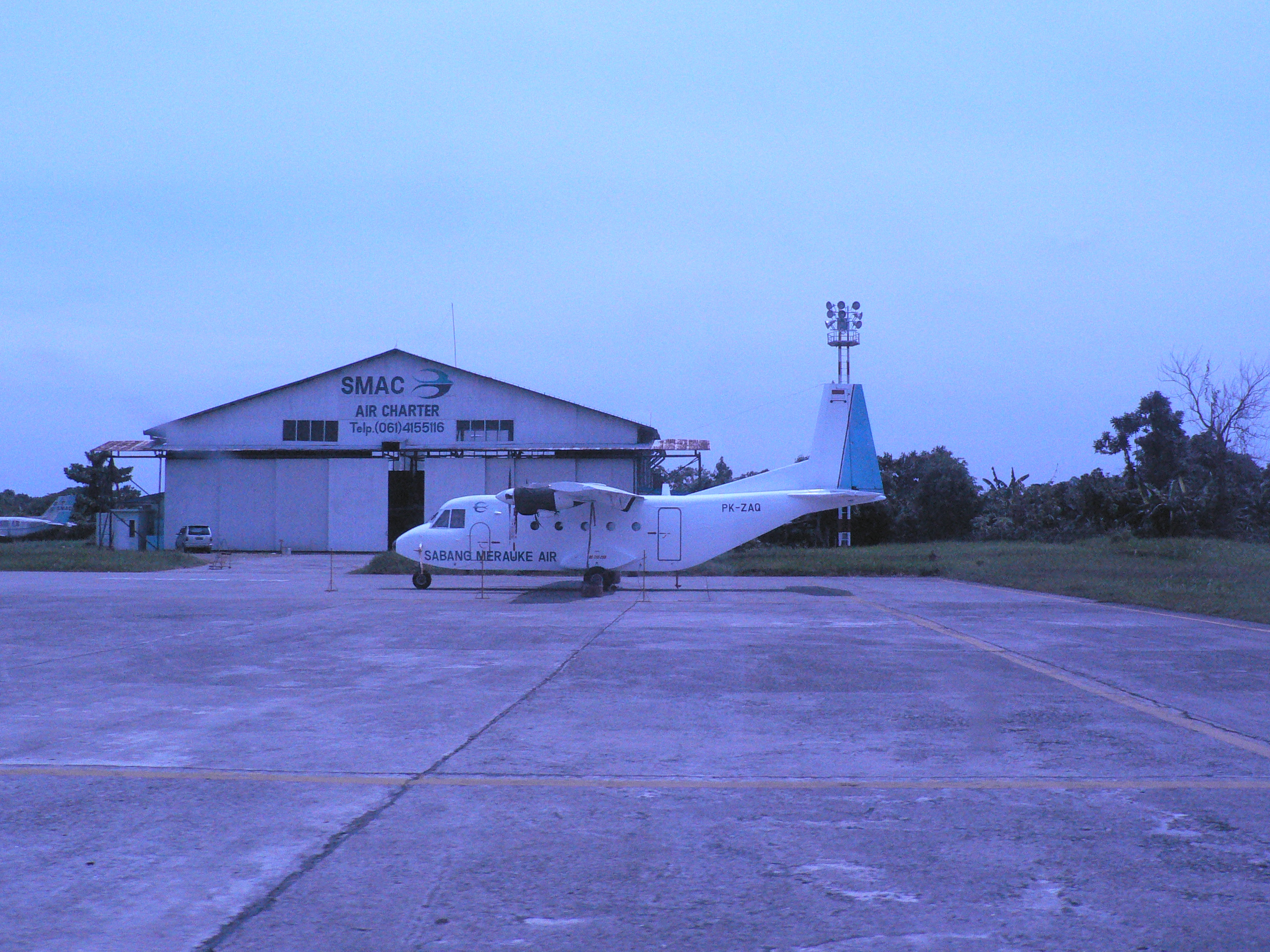
Sabang Merauke Air's NC-212-100 at Medan Polonia Airport

At the time of its closure, Sabang Merauke Raya Air Charter's fleet included:

- 2 Indonesian Aerospace NC-212-100 (one crashed)

The airline had also operated:

- 1 de Havilland Canada DHC-6 Twin Otter Series 300
- 1 Britten-Norman BN-2A Islander
- Piper PA-23 Aztec
- Piper PA-31 Navajo

== Former destinations ==
- Buol – Pogogul Airport
- Makassar – Sultan Hasanuddin International Airport
- Palu – Mutiara SIS Al-Jufrie Airport
- Selayar – H. Aroeppala Airport
- Toli Toli – Sultan Bantilan Airport

== Incidents ==
- On November 30, 2006, IPTN NC-212 PK-ZAI crashed on landing; no injuries or deaths were reported.
- On February 12, 2011, five people were killed when a CASA NC-212 Aviocar, belonging to SMAC, crashed on Bintan Island, Indonesia during a test flight.
