= Taka Bonerate Islands =

District in Selayar Islands Regency, South Sulawesi Province, Indonesia

Coordinates: 6°41′10″S 121°9′10″E

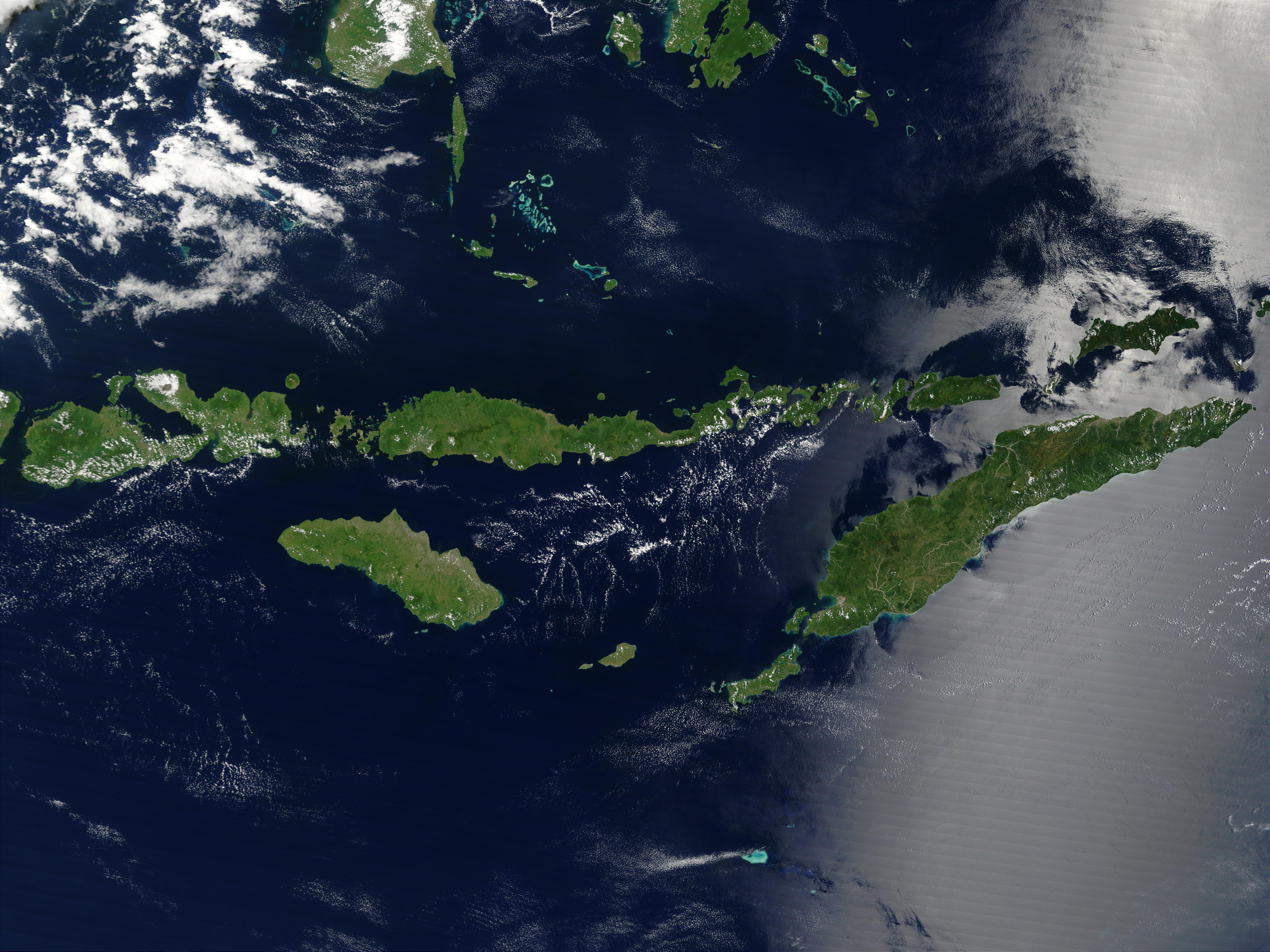
The Lesser Sunda Islands (with the Taka Bonerate Islands in the upper centre, north of Flores)

The Taka Bonerate Islands in Indonesia consist of 28 atoll islands (including Latondu, Rajuni, Tinabo, Pasi Telu, and Taka Lumungan), together with the larger island of Kayuadi lying west of the atoll. They lie about 3 to 4 hours by boat from Benteng, the administrative capital of the Selayar Islands. Together they make up the Takabonerate District of Selayar Regency in South Sulawesi Province. It is part of a National Marine Park, with dive sites, pelagic fishes, dolphins, turtles, many soft corals, sea fans. Also it is the third largest atoll in the world.

== See also ==
- Bone Sultanate
- Takabonerate Official Site
