= Aethalida rudis =

Scientific classification
- Kingdom: Animalia
- Phylum: Arthropoda
- Class: Insecta
- Order: Lepidoptera
- Superfamily: Noctuoidea
- Family: Erebidae
- Subfamily: Arctiinae
- Genus: Aethalida
- Species: A. rudis

Binomial name
- Aethalida rudis (Walker, 1864)

Synonyms
- Areas rudis Walker, [1865]; Aethalida distinguenda Walker, 1864 [1865]; Pericallia distinguenda ab. reducta Rothschild, 1914

Species of moth

Aethalida rudis is a moth of the family Erebidae. It was described by Francis Walker in 1864. It is found on Sulawesi in Indonesia.
