= Aethalida banggaiensis =

Scientific classification
- Domain: Eukaryota
- Kingdom: Animalia
- Phylum: Arthropoda
- Class: Insecta
- Order: Lepidoptera
- Superfamily: Noctuoidea
- Family: Erebidae
- Subfamily: Arctiinae
- Genus: Aethalida
- Species: A. banggaiensis

Binomial name
- Aethalida banggaiensis (Nieuwenhuis, 1948)

Synonyms
- Aethalida rudis banggaiensis

Species of moth

Aethalida banggaiensis is a moth of the family Erebidae. It was described by Nieuwenhuis in 1948. It is found on Banggai Island.
