= Aethalida quadrimaculata =

Scientific classification
- Domain: Eukaryota
- Kingdom: Animalia
- Phylum: Arthropoda
- Class: Insecta
- Order: Lepidoptera
- Superfamily: Noctuoidea
- Family: Erebidae
- Subfamily: Arctiinae
- Genus: Aethalida
- Species: A. quadrimaculata

Binomial name
- Aethalida quadrimaculata (Talbot, 1929)

Synonyms
- Pericallia quadrimaculata Talbot, 1929

Species of moth

Aethalida quadrimaculata is a moth of the family Erebidae. It was described by George Talbot in 1929. It is found on Sulawesi in Indonesia.
