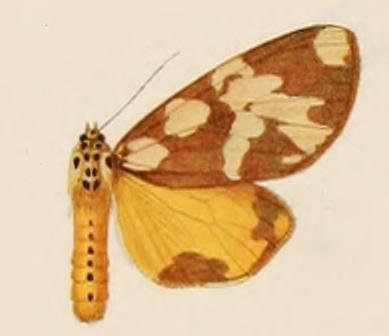
- Aethalida dora

Scientific classification
- Kingdom: Animalia
- Phylum: Arthropoda
- Class: Insecta
- Order: Lepidoptera
- Superfamily: Noctuoidea
- Family: Erebidae
- Subfamily: Arctiinae
- Subtribe: Spilosomina
- Genus: Aethalida; Walker, [1865]

Type species
- Aethalida distinguenda Walker, [1865] 1864

Synonyms
- Meringocera Felder, 1874

= Aethalida =

Genus of moths

Aethalida is a genus of tiger moths in the family Erebidae that occur in the Sundaland and Philippines.

== Species ==
- Aethalida banggaiensis (Nieuwenhuis, 1948)
- Aethalida borneana Holloway, 1988
- Aethalida conflictalis (Walker, 1864)
  - Meringocera plutonica Felder, 1874
- Aethalida dohertyi (Hampson, 1901)
- Aethalida dora (Semper, 1899)
- Aethalida hollowayi Dubatolov & Kishida, 2005
- Aethalida owadai Dubatolov & Kishida, 2005
- Aethalida pasinuntia (Stoll, 1782)
  - Meringocera tricolor Pagenstecher, 1888
  - Pangora burica Holland, 1900
  - Arctia caja amboinensis Swinhoe, 1916
  - Pericallia rudis albidior Rothschild, 1935
- Aethalida quadrimaculata (Talbot, 1929)
- Aethalida rudis (Walker, 1864)
  - Aethalida distinguenda Walker, 1864 [1865]
  - Pericallia distinguenda ab. reducta Rothschild, 1914
- Aethalida whiteheadi (Rothschild, 1910)
