= Aethalida conflictalis =

Scientific classification
- Kingdom: Animalia
- Phylum: Arthropoda
- Class: Insecta
- Order: Lepidoptera
- Superfamily: Noctuoidea
- Family: Erebidae
- Subfamily: Arctiinae
- Genus: Aethalida
- Species: A. conflictalis

Binomial name
- Aethalida conflictalis (Walker, 1864)

Synonyms
- Areas conflictalis Walker, 1864; Pericallia conflictalis; Meringocera plutonica Felder, 1874

Species of moth

Aethalida conflictalis is a moth of the family Erebidae. It was described by Francis Walker in 1864. It is found in the northern Maluku Islands.
