= Kayuadi Island =

Island in Indonesia

Native name: Pulau Kayuadi
- Interactive map of Kayuadi Island

Geography
- Coordinates: 6°48′56″S 120°47′56″E
- Archipelago: Selayar Islands

Kayuadi Island (Id:Pulau Kayuadi) is an island in the Selayar Islands of South Sulawesi, Indonesia. Most people on the island speak Selayar. The island's economy is based around agriculture, with cassava and banana being major crops. As of 1998, the harvesting of sea cucumbers (tripang) was a major occupation. Kayuadi is one of the few islands home to a smaller subspecies of reticulated python.
