= Aethalida pasinuntia =

Scientific classification
- Domain: Eukaryota
- Kingdom: Animalia
- Phylum: Arthropoda
- Class: Insecta
- Order: Lepidoptera
- Superfamily: Noctuoidea
- Family: Erebidae
- Subfamily: Arctiinae
- Genus: Aethalida
- Species: A. pasinuntia

Binomial name
- Aethalida pasinuntia (Stoll, 1782)

Synonyms
- Bombyx pasinuntia Stoll, 1782; Pericallia pasinuntia; Meringocera tricolor Pagenstecher, 1888; Pangora burica Holland, 1900; Arcia caja amboinensis Swinhoe, 1916; Pericallia rudis albidior Rothschild, 1935

Species of moth

Aethalida pasinuntia is a moth of the family Erebidae. It was described by Stoll in 1782. It is found in the southern Moluccas.
