= Aethalida dohertyi =

Scientific classification
- Kingdom: Animalia
- Phylum: Arthropoda
- Class: Insecta
- Order: Lepidoptera
- Superfamily: Noctuoidea
- Family: Erebidae
- Subfamily: Arctiinae
- Genus: Aethalida
- Species: A. dohertyi

Binomial name
- Aethalida dohertyi (Hampson, 1901)

Synonyms
- Pericallia dohertyi Hampson, 1901

Species of moth

Aethalida dohertyi is a moth of the family Erebidae. It was described by George Hampson, a British entomologist, in 1901. It is found on the Sangir Islands.
