= Wajo Regency =

Regency in South Sulawesi, Indonesia

Coordinates: 4.1264°S 120.0319°E

Wajo Regency Kabupaten Wajo
- Regency
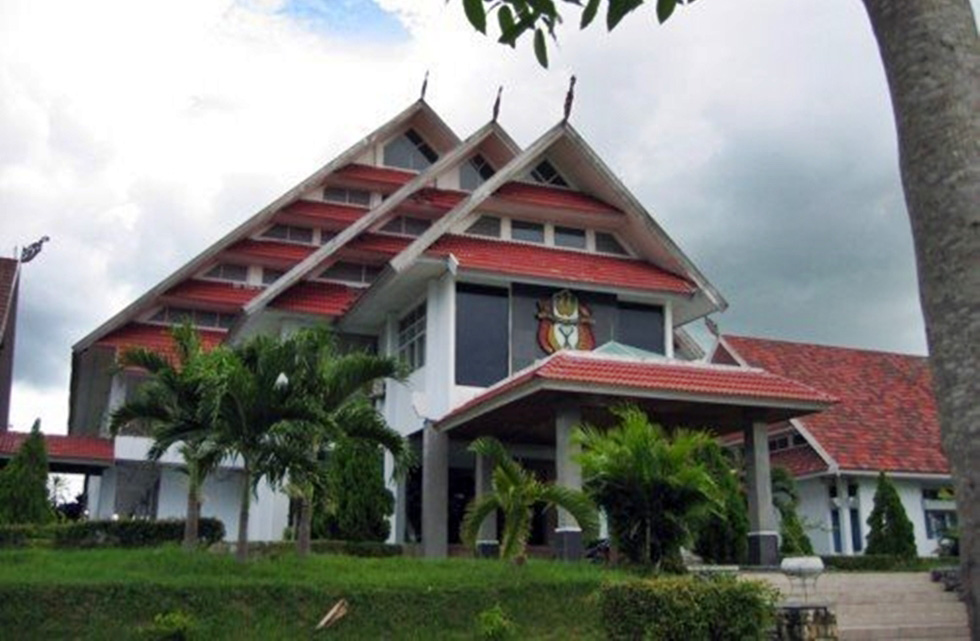
- Wajo Regent's Office

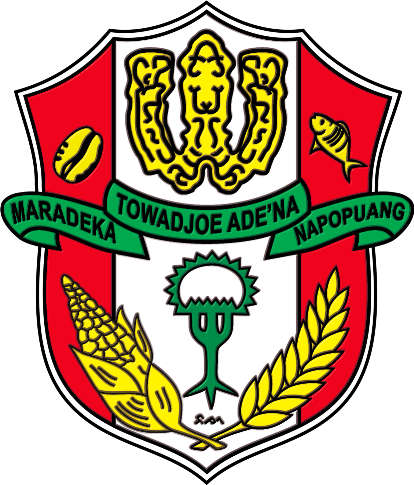
- Coat of arms
- Motto: Maradeka Towadjoe Ade'na Napopuang
- Location within South Sulawesi
- Country: Indonesia
- Province: South Sulawesi
- Capital: Sengkang

Government
  - Regent: Andi Rosman
  - Vice Regent: Baso Rahmanuddin

Area
  - Total: 2,608.72 km^{2} (1,007.23 sq mi)

Population (mid 2025 estimate)
  - Total: 400,878
  - Density: 153.668/km^{2} (397.999/sq mi)
- Time zone: UTC+8 (WITA)
- Area code: (+62) 485
- Website: http://wajokab.go.id

Wajo Regency (Buginese: ᨓᨍᨚ, romanized: Wajo’, Buginese pronunciation: [waɟoʔ]) is a regency (kecamatan) in South Sulawesi Province of Indonesia. It covers a land area of 2,608.72 km^{2} and had a population of 384,694 at the 2010 Census, and 379,079 at the 2020 Census; the official estimate as of mid 2025 was 400,878 (comprising 195,645 males and 205,233 females). Established in 1959, Wajo Regency has its seat of government (capital) in the town of Sengkang, part of the urban area of Tempe, which is situated in the eastern shore of Lake Tempe, South Sulawesi's largest inland lake.

== History ==
The modern Wajo Regency was established on 4 July 1959, covering the land area of the former Kingdom of Wajoq.

== Administration ==
The Wajo Regency in 2025 (as in 2010) comprises fourteen administrative Districts (Kecamatan), tabulated below with their areas and their populations at the 2010 Census and the 2020 Census, together with the official estimates as at mid 2025. The table also includes the location of the district administrative centres, the number of administrative villages in each district (totaling 142 rural desa and 48 urban kelurahan), and its postcode.

Kode Wilayah	Name of District (kecamatan)	Area in km^{2}	Pop'n Census 2010	Pop'n Census 2020	Pop'n Estimate mid 2025	Admin centre	No. of desa	No. of kelurahan	Post code
73.13.01	Sabbangparu	153.38	25,785	24,365	25,353	Kota Baru	12	3	90961
73.13.06	Tempe ^{(a)}	46.92	61,053	64,320	69,439	Sengkang	-	16	90811: 90918
73.13.02	Pammana	154.45	31,205	30,712	32,250	Maroanging	14	2	90971
73.13.11	Bola	178.63	19,385	19,435	20,776	Solo	10	1	90984
73.13.03	Takkalalla	157.43	20,612	19,981	20,654	Peneki	11	2	90981
73.13.04	Sajoanging	173.75	18,678	17,525	18,310	Jalang	6	3	90982
73.13.12	Penrang	138.39	15,530	14,799	15,894	Doping	9	1	90983
73.13.05	Majauleng	222.06	31,207	30,713	31,812	Paria	14	4	90991
73.13.08	Tanasitolo	168.66	39,280	39,324	41,248	Tancung	15	4	90951
73.13.07	Belawa	227.52	31,924	30,153	31,702	Menge	6	3	90953 ^{(b)}
73.13.09	Maniangpajo	226.52	16,012	15,762	17,085	Anabanua	5	3	90952
73.13.13	Gilireng	196.68	11,031	10,875	11,580	Gilireng	8	1	90954
73.13.14	Keera	374.12	21,734	20,237	21,777	Keera	9	1	90993
73.13.10	Pitumpanua	180.25	41,673	40,878	42,998	Siwa	23	4	90992
	Totals	2,608.72	385,109	379,079	400,878	Sengkang	142	48	

Note: (a) urban centre, comprising all kelurahan. (b) except for the village of Lepangeng, which has a postcode of 90913.
