= Aethalida borneana =

Scientific classification
- Kingdom: Animalia
- Phylum: Arthropoda
- Clade: Pancrustacea
- Class: Insecta
- Order: Lepidoptera
- Superfamily: Noctuoidea
- Family: Erebidae
- Subfamily: Arctiinae
- Genus: Aethalida
- Species: A. borneana

Binomial name
- Aethalida borneana Holloway, 1988

Species of moth

Aethalida borneana is a moth of the family Erebidae. It was described by Jeremy Daniel Holloway in 1988. It is found on Borneo.
