= Selayar Islands Regency =

Regency in South Sulawesi, Indonesia

Selayar Islands Regency Kabupaten Kepulauan Selayar
- Regency
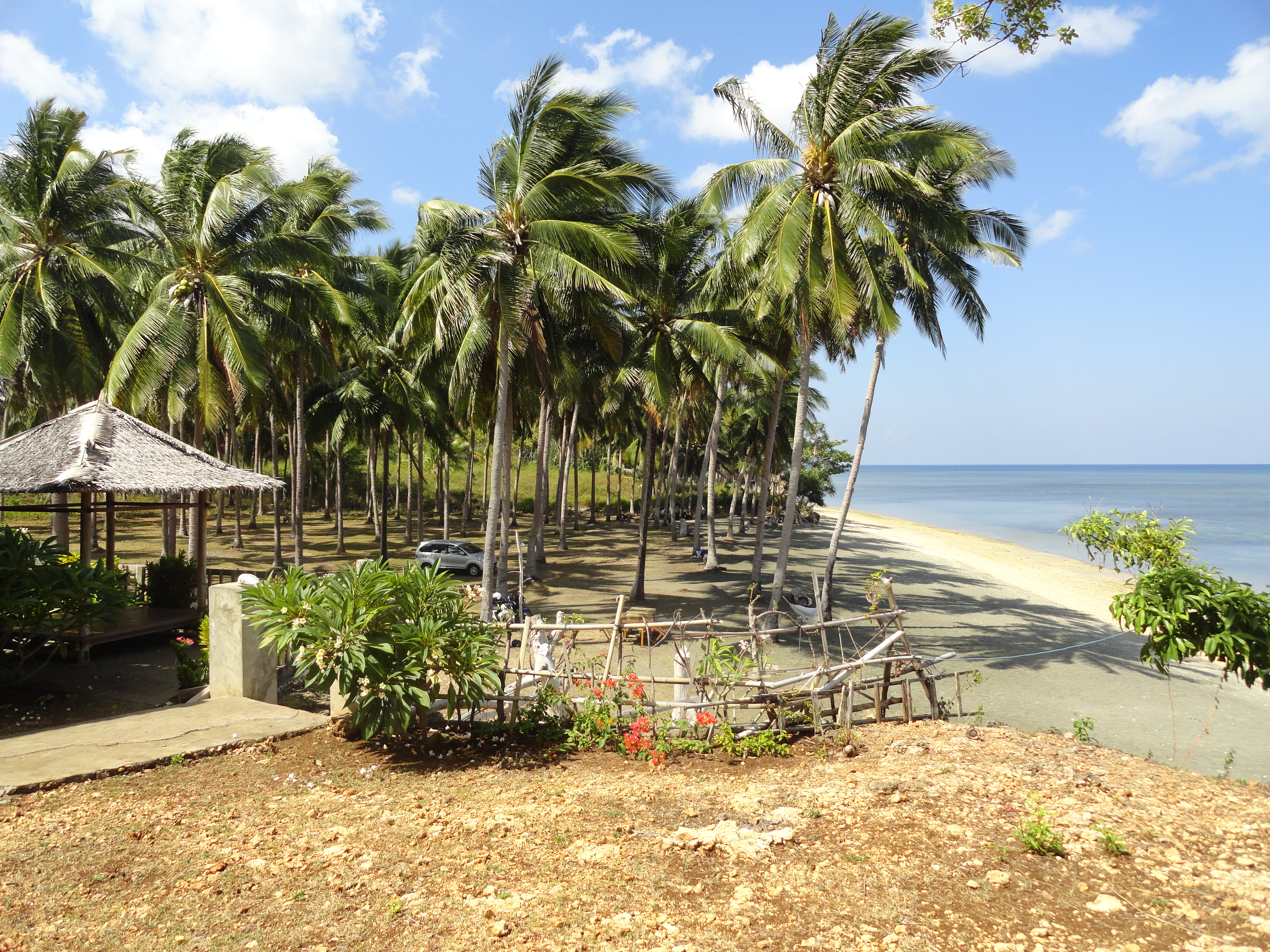
- Bungalow on a Beach on the West coast of Selayar Island

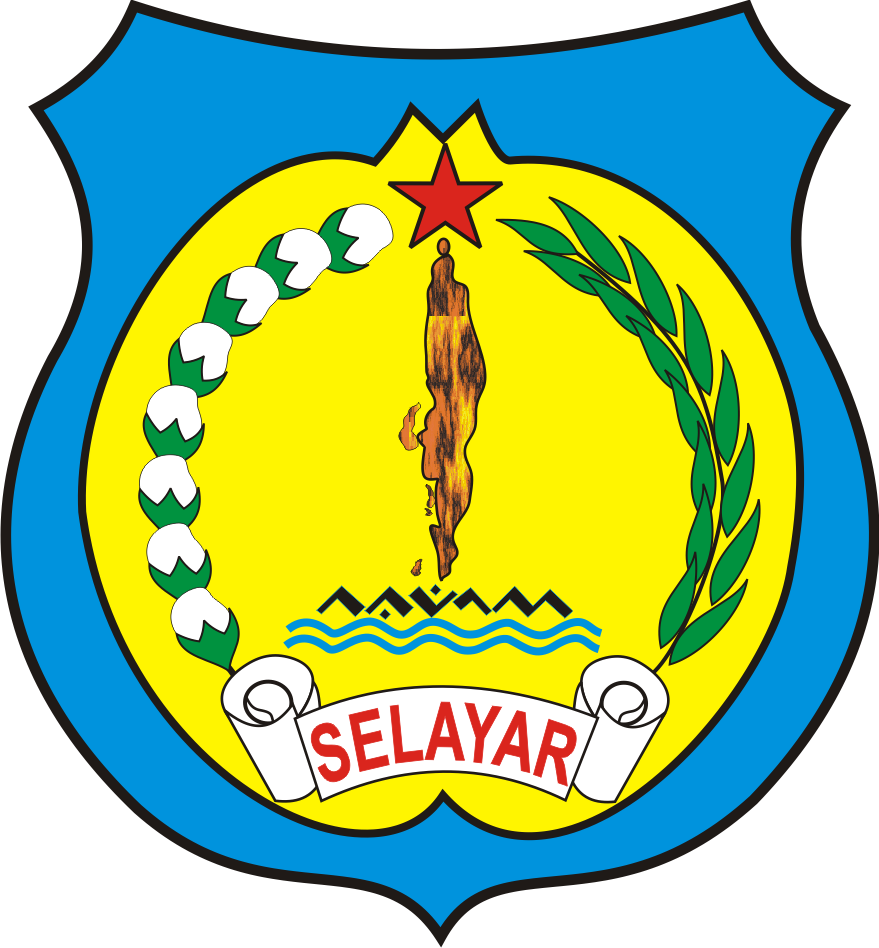
- Coat of arms
- Nickname: Tanadoang
- Motto: Selayar Mapan Mandiri
- Location within South Sulawesi

- Location in Sulawesi and Indonesia Selayar Islands Regency (Indonesia)
- Coordinates: 6.81667°S 120.8°E
- Country: Indonesia
- Region: Sulawesi
- Province: South Sulawesi
- Anniversary: 29 November 1605; 420 years ago
- Capital: Benteng

Government
  - Regent: Muhammad Natsir Ali
  - Vice Regent: Muhtar

Area
  - Total: 1,357.03 km^{2} (523.95 sq mi)

Population (mid 2025 estimate)
  - Total: 143,580
  - Density: 105.80/km^{2} (274.03/sq mi)
- Time zone: UTC+8 (ICST)
- Postcode: 92812
- Area code: (+62) 414
- Vehicle registration: DD
- Website: kepulauanselayarkab.go.id

The Selayar Islands Regency (Selayar: Silàjara Selayar pronunciation: [siˈlaɟara], Makasar: ᨔᨗᨒᨐᨑ, romanized: Silàyara’, Makasar pronunciation: [siˈlajaraʔ]) is a regency of Indonesia in South Sulawesi province that covers the Selayar Islands, which lie southeast of the southern peninsula of Sulawesi. The archipelago consists of the group's main island (Selayar Island), which is surrounded by 41 smaller islands around its coast; further to the southeast lies a widespread group of islands, including the smaller but still substantial islands of Pasimassunggu, Pasimarannu and Pasilambena in the far south, and the huge atoll of Takabonerate (itself containing 28 named islands). The regency covers a land area of 1,357.03 km^{2} (with an associated maritime area of 9,146.66 km^{2}), and had a population of 103,596 at the 2000 Census, 122,055 at the Census of 2010 and 137,071 as of 2020. The official estimate for mid 2025 was 143,580 (comprising 70,659 males and 72,921 females). The administrative centre is the town of Benteng on Selayar Island. The Selayar Straits separate the regency from Sulawesi island.

== Administration ==
=== Administrative districts ===
The Selayar Islands Regency is divided into eleven districts (kecamatan), tabulated below with their populations at the 2010 Census and the 2020 Census, together with the official estimates for mid 2025. The table also includes the locations of the administrative centres ('capitals') of the districts, the numbers of villages (a total of 81 rural desa and 7 urban kelurahan) and named islands within each district, and its post code(s).

Kode Wilayah	Name of District (kecamatan)	Area in km^{2}	Pop'n Census 2010	Pop'n Census 2020	Pop'n Estimate mid 2025	Admin centre	No. of villages	No. of islands	Post code(s)
73.01.07	Pasimarannu	195.33	8,959	10,492	11,167	Bonerate	8	9	92862
73.01.09	Pasilambena	114.88	6,786	8,005	8,815	Kalaotoa	6	13	92863
73.01.06	Pasimassunggu	131.80	7,625	8,638	9,520	Kembang Ragi	7	21	92861 ^{(a)}
73.01.08	Taka Bonerate ^{(b)}	49.30	12,296	13,484	15,251	Batang	9	17	92860
73.01.10	Pasimassunggu Timur (East Pasimassunggu)	67.14	7,307	7,866	8,230	Bontobulaeng	6	2	92861
	Southern sector ^{(c)}	558.45	42,973	48,485	52,983		36	62	
73.01.05	Bontosikuyu	248.22	14,332	15,303	16,182	Harapan	12	21	92855
73.01.02	Bontoharu ^{(d)}	128.12	12,484	14,608	15,586	Bontobangun	8 ^{(e)}	4	92811
73.01.01	Benteng (town)	24.63	21,344	24,849	24,536	Benteng	3 ^{(f)}	-	92812
73.01.04	Bontomanai	136.42	12,226	13,703	14,052	Polebungin	10	-	92851
73.01.11	Buki	68.14	6,125	6,742	6,850	Buki	7	-	92851: 92854
73.01.03	Bontomatene ^{(g)}	193.05	12,571	13,381	13,391	Batangmata	12 ^{(h)}	5	92854
	Selayar Island sector ^{(i)}	798.58	79,082	88,586	90,597		52	30	

Notes: (a) except the desa of Bontosaile, which has a postcode of 92811. (b) Taka Bonerate District includes the atoll of that name, together with Kayuadi Island to its west.
(c) in the south of the regency, these five districts form the smaller island groups to the south and south-east of Selayar Island, running west to east.
(d) including the small offshore islands of Pulau Pasi, Pulau Gusung, Pulau Gusungtallang and Pulau Batuampangan off the west coast of Selayar Island.
(e) including 2 kelurahan – Bontobangun and Putabangun. (f) comprising 3 kelurahan – Benteng, Benteng Selatan and Benteng Utara. (g) including the offshore island of Pulau Pasitanete to the north of Selayar Island and 4 smaller islands.
(h) including 2 kelurahan – Batangmata and Batangmata Sapo. (i) these six districts, listed here from south to north, constitute the main island (Selayar Island) and include the small islands off its coast.

=== Regent ===
The following are the names of the Leader / Regent of the Selayar Islands since 1739 until now :

Colonization Period VOC
No	Name	Designation / Position	year of Assignment	Handover Years
1	W. Coutsier	Resident	1739	1743
2	Bargraf	Resident	1743	1753
3	D. J. Tempesel	Resident	1753	1757
4	A. Revenabers	Resident	1757	1757
5	J. C. Helmkamp	Resident	1757	1757
6	H. Burggraff	Resident	1757	1758
7	J. B. Bekker	Resident	1758	1764
8	M. van Rossen	Resident	1764	1766
9	J. H. Voll	Resident	1766	1780
10	L. J. Swart	Resident	1780	1781
11	Awetys	Resident	1781	1789
data sources : www.selayaronline.com

Netherlands East Indies era
No	Name	Designation / Position	year of Assignment	Handover Years
12	S. Jassen	Resident	1789	1801
13	H. C. H. Anrhe	Resident	1801	1806
14	S. Jassen	Resident	1806	1807
15	H. C. Rosebon	Resident	1807	1820
16	G, W. Muller	Resident	1820	1824
17	J. C. B. Baren	Asisten Resident	1824	1825
18	Bakman Klerk	W. D. Resident	1825	1827
19	J. C. Rad N. Barge	W. D. Resident	1827	1830
20	H. Mulder	W. D. Resident	1830	1839
21	J. L. Mulder	Gesag Herbber	1839	1843
22	Trompburg	Gesag Herbber	1843	1848
23	P. H. van Heyest	Gesag Herbber	1848	1851
24	J. AJ. Voll	Gesag Herbber	1851	1855
25	W. Delancy	Gesag Herbber	1855	1857
26	G. A. van Kesteran	Gesag Herbber	1857	1857
27	A. H. Swaring	W. D. Controleuer	1857	1859
28	J. W. Kroller	Gesag Herbber	1859	1860
29	G. A. van Kerteran	Ambel Mibesteur	1860	1863
30	W. DE. Lancy	Controleur 2 EKL	1863	1865
31	A. L. H. A. Negel	Controleur 2 EKL	1865	1867
32	W. F. Sikman	Controleur 2 EKL	1867	1870
33	A. C. F. Burlet	Controleur 2 EKL	1870	1873
34	J. F. Schenk Muisen	Controleur 1 EKL	1873	1873
35	D. F. vanbram Morris	Controleur Vanmei	1873	1876
36	H. C. Begeardt	Controleur Vanmei	1876	1877
37	G. A. L. W. Sol	Controleur 2 EKL	1877	1878
38	P. D. Wiggers	Controleur 2 EKL	1878	1878
39	R. H. D. Fongelbert	Controleur 1 EKL	1878	1881
40	A. J. Baren Quarles	Controleur 1 EKL	1881	1882
41	A. A. Schuuten	Controleur 2 EKL	1882	1884
42	W. G. Coenen	Asp. Controleur	1884	1885
43	J. C. E. T Rom	Controleur 1 EKL	18 December 1885	18 May 1887
44	E. A. Klerk	Controleur 1 EKL	18 May 1887	17 July 1888
45	Th Krusen	Controleur 1 EKL	17 July 1888	17 June 1889
46	J. van Hassteri	Controleur 2 EKL	17 June 1889	16 October 1889
47	F. Wiggers	Controleur 2 EKL	16 October 1889	April 1894
48	D. C. Boek	Controleur 1 EKL	April 1894	April 1895
49	G. J. Kopman	Controleur 2 EKL	April 1895	7 January 1899
50	H. J. Kregers	Controleur 2 EKL	7 January 1899	9 August 1901
51	B. G. A. J van Binter	Controleur 2 EKL	18 October 1901	13 January 1903
52	H. H. Lubliek Weddik	Asp. Controleur	9 May 1903	13 November 1903
53	O. M. Goedhart	Controleur	13 November 1903	11 February 1904
54	P. A. Qudemans	Controleur	13 June 1904	18 August 1905
55	H. R. Adesma	Asp. Controleur	18 August 1905	6 March 1906
56	L. R. Wenthold	Asp. Controleur	8 March 1906	21 June 1907
57	J. J. Lena	Asp. Controleur	21 June 1907	29 June 1910
58	G. L. Barents	Asp. Controleur	29 June 1910	6 July 1912
59	R. A. W. Schrouder	Asp. Controleur	6 July 1912	29 August 1912
60	E. E. W. C. Sehrekreden	Asp. Controleur	29 August 1912	2 February 1914
61	D. J. C. Kreeber	Asp. Controleur	2 February 1914	2 June 1916
62	B. J. M. Baden	Gesaghebber	2 June 1916	26 January 1919
63	C. M. Buys	Controleur	27 January 1919	6 January 1920
64	J. T. Misandolle	Controleur	6 January 1920	1 June 1920
65	A. M. Ballot	Controleur	1 June 1920	13 December 1920
66	H. T. Lanting	WD. Controleur	13 December 1920	28 April 1921
67	H. C. Groenestein	Gesaghebber	28 April 1921	5 May 1922
68	W. D. J. van Andel	FD. Controleur	5 May 1922	21 January 1925
69	S. L. E. van Woendenburg	Controleur	21 January 1925	10 July 1925
70	C. F. Schoeder	Gedepl Gesaghebber	10 July 1925	20 July 1925
71	F. B. R. van Resum	Asp. Controleur	20 July 1925	18 August 1925
72	J. H. W. van Den Missen	Asp. Residen Titulair	18 August 1925	16 December 1925
73	H. J. Woest Hoer	Controleur	16 December 1925	16 May 1926
74	S. Stuensma	Controleur	16 May 1926	20 April 1927
75	J. B. M. Delion	Controleur 1 EKL	20 April 1927	7 July 1928
76	H. J. Hoeetra	Controleuriekl B.B	7 July 1928	26 January 1929
77	J. Koester	Controleuriekl B.B	26 January 1929	23 December 1929
78	D. J. A. Vander Vliot	Gesaghebber 1 EKL	23 December 1929	17 October 1932
79	A. Twerde	Controleuriekl B.B	17 October 1932	17 January 1933
80	J. W. D. Monti	Gedip Gesaghebber	17 January 1933	18 February 1936
81	Dr. OH. Noetebom	Controleur	18 February 1936	11 October 1937
82	J. M. van Liye	Controleur	11 October 1937	22 February 1939
83	G. J. Wolf Hoff	Controleur	22 February 1939	21 July 1939
84	J. A. Willeman	WD. Controleur	21 July 1939	25 July 1939
85	J. M. van Keekeh	FD. Controleur	25 July 1939	28 August 1940
86	W. Klaus	Gedip Gesaghebber	28 August 1940	1 November 1941
87	W. Heeybeer	Controleur	1 November 1941	29 April 1942
data sources : www.selayaronline.com

Second World War Japanese occupation
No	Name	Designation / Position	year of Assignment	Handover Years
88	M. Opoe Patta Boendoe	Guntjo Sodai	29 April 1942	21 June 1943
89	Momono	Bunken Kanriken	21 June 1943	13 May 1944
90	T. Misouti	Bunken Kanriken	13 May 1944	14 September 1945
91	M. Opoe Patta Boendoe	Bunken Kanriken	14 September 1945	11 February 1946
data sources : www.selayaronline.com

Transition from Japanese occupation
No	Name	Designation / Position	year of Assignment	Handover Years
92	W.H. Ayboer	Controleur	11 February 1946	9 March 1946
93	T. J. Halvedrusse	Controleur	9 March 1946	5 February 1947
94	J. van Bodegong	Controleur	5 February 1947	21 June 1947
95	C. H. Mollen	Controleur	21 June 1947	30 August 1947
data sources : www.selayaronline.com

Period States Government of the Republic of Indonesia
No	Name	Designation / Position	year of Assignment	Handover Years
96	Muh. Ali Krg. Bonto	Bertuurshoofd	30 August 1947	3 April 1950
97	Andi Achmad	Bertuurshoofd	3 April 1950	15 June 1950
98	Tadjuddin Dg. Matjora	vice KPN	15 June 1950	29 June 1950
99	Aroeppala	Bertuurshoofd	29 June 1950	20 October 1951
data sources : www.selayaronline.com

Period of Government of the Republic of Indonesia
No	Name	Designation / Position	year of Assignment	Handover Years
100	Abd. Karim	vice KPN	20 October 1951	5 May 1952
101	Muh. Arsyad	KPN	5 May 1952	11 June 1953
102	Abd. Karim	vice KPN	11 June 1953	14 August 1953
103	Djamaluddin	KPN	14 August 1953	18 July 1955
104	Bustam Dg. Sitaba	KPN	18 July 1955	1 December 1956
105	Marcus Pong Manda	KPN	1 December 1956	4 March 1960
106	Andi Matja Amirullah	Regent	4 March 1960	10 April 1965
107	Drs. Patta Tjora	Pds. Regent	10 April 1965	5 August 1965
108	Drs. A. H. Dg. Marimba	Regent	5 August 1965	6 November 1968
109	M. Amin Dg. Suroresiden	Pel. Tgs. Regent	6 November 1968	1 May 1969
110	Abd. Rauf Rahman	Regent	1 May 1969	25 January 1971
111	A. Palioi	Regent	25 January 1971	18 November 1974
112	H. Andi Bachtiar	Pd. Regent	18 November 1974	14 September 1975
113	Drs. Anas Achmad	Regent	14 September 1975	16 December 1983
114	Drs. H. A. Achmad Natsir	Pel. Tgs. Regent	16 December 1983	10 July 1984
115	Ismail	Regent	10 July 1984	10 July 1989
116	Drs. Z. Arifin Kammi	Regent	10 July 1989	11 July 1994
117	Drs. H. M. Akib Patta	Regent	11 July 1994	11 August 1999
118	H. Mirdin Kasim, SH, M.Si	Pj. Regent	11 August 1999	29 December 1999
119	Drs. H. M. Akib Patta	Regent	29 December 1999	29 December 2004
120	H. A. Syamsul Alam Mallarangeng	Pj. Regent	29 December 2004	30 October 2005
121	Drs. H. Syahrir Wahab, MM	Regent	30 October 2005	30 October 2015
122	Drs. H. Syamsibar, MM	Pj. Regent	30 October 2015	17 February 2016
123	H. M. Basli Ali	Regent	17 February 2016	17 February 2021
124	Marjani Sultan	Pih. Regent	17 February 2021	26 February 2021
125	H. M. Basli Ali	Regent	26 February 2021	in post
data sources : www.selayaronline.com

== Demography ==
Population growth charts Selayar Islands Regency

data sources : Selayar Islands Regency in figures 2010

== Sea turtle village ==
Kampung Penyu (Sea turtle village) in Bontomanai district is sea turtle conservation area under supervision of Taka Bone Rate National Park.

== Gallery ==
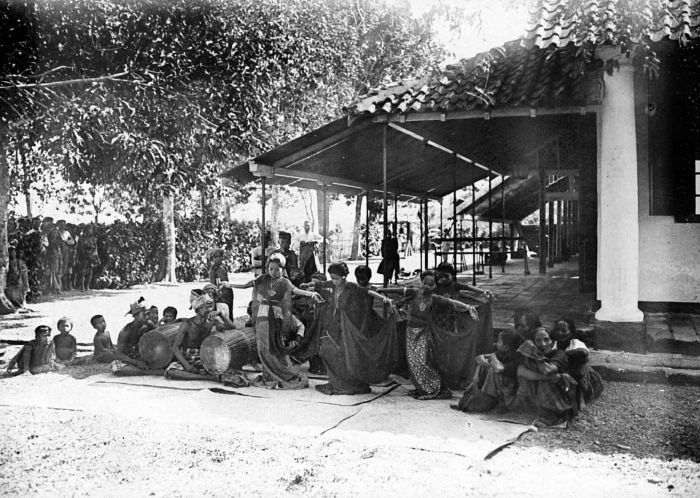

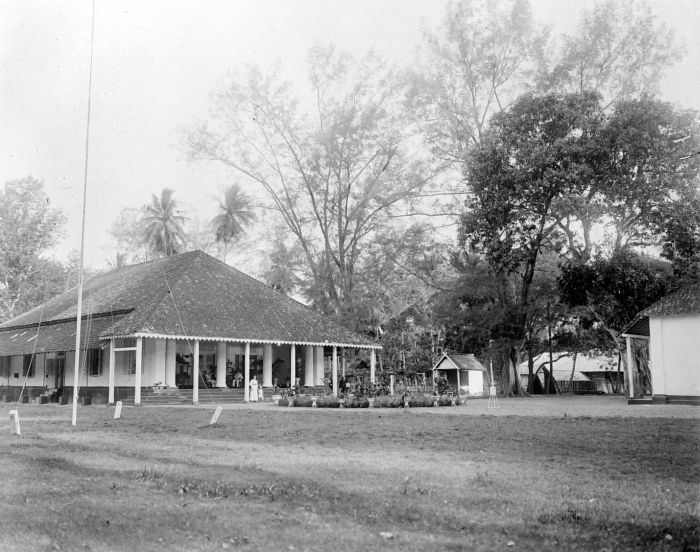

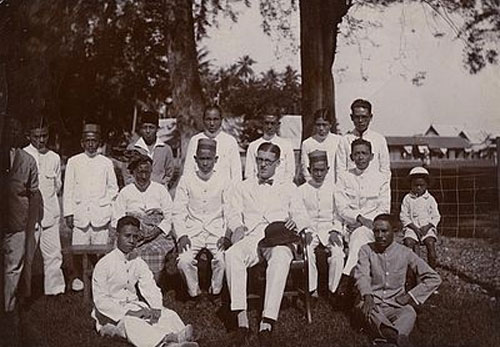

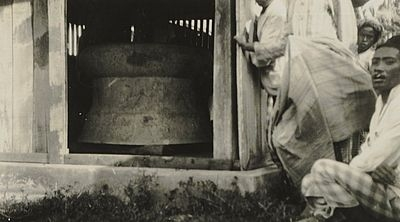

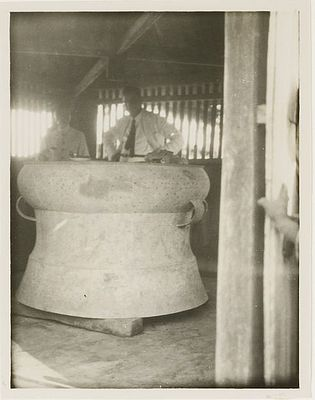

== See also ==
- H. Aroeppala Airport
