= Larompong =

- Kecamatan and town
- Location in Sulawesi Larompong (Indonesia)
- Coordinates: 3°30′56″S 120°21′8″E
- Country: Indonesia
- Province: South Sulawesi
- Regency: Luwu Regency
- Time zone: UTC+7 (WIB)

Larompong is a small town and kecamatan in the southern part of the Luwu Regency of South Sulawesi, Indonesia. The town is located on the eastern coast of South Sulawesi on the Gulf of Boni, north by road from Pitumpanua. The Sampano River (Salo Sampano) flows through this area and into the sea south of the town. Larompong is inhabited by the Wajo peoples who also speak a dialect of the Wajo language.

== History ==
Larompong belonged historically to the Kingdom of Luwu, now the regency of the same name. Larompong was defended by 500 Luwu troops under Daeng Mattola but fled when the allied army approached. In July 1676, the Datu Luru chased Daeng Mattola out of the region.
