= Lake Tempe =

Lake in Indonesia

Tempe
- Location within Sulawesi
- Location: South Sulawesi, Indonesia
- Coordinates: 4°6′20″S 119°56′49″E
- Type: Floodplain
- Basin countries: Indonesia
- Surface area: 350 km^{2} (140 sq mi)
- Max. depth: 5 m (16 ft)
- Surface elevation: 5 m (16 ft)

Lake Tempe (Indonesian: Danau Tempe) is a lake in South Sulawesi, Indonesia. It is located at 4°6′20″S 119°56′49″E. The town of Sengkang is situated to the east of the lake. The lake is the biggest lake in South Sulawesi.

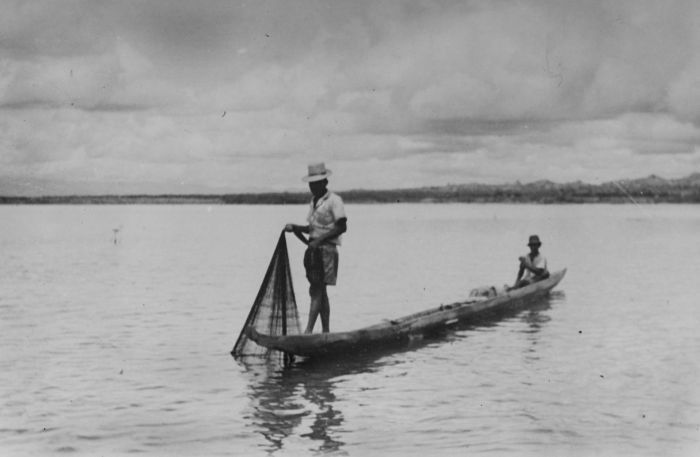
Fishermen on Lake Tempe (1948-1949)

== See also ==
- List of lakes of Indonesia
