= Sengkang, Johor =

Town in Kulai district, Johor, Malaysia

Coordinates: 2°16′N 102°41′E

Sengkang is a town in Tangkak District, Johor, Malaysia. The local authority of town is Ledang Municipal Council.
