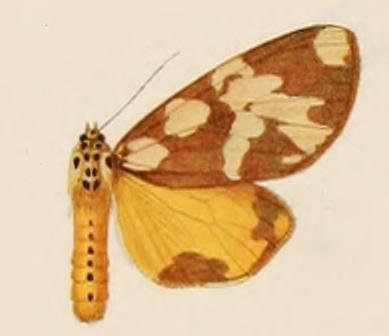
- Aethalida Dora

Scientific classification
- Domain: Eukaryota
- Kingdom: Animalia
- Phylum: Arthropoda
- Class: Insecta
- Order: Lepidoptera
- Superfamily: Noctuoidea
- Family: Erebidae
- Subfamily: Arctiinae
- Genus: Aethalida
- Species: A. dora

Binomial name
- Aethalida dora (Semper, 1899)

Synonyms
- Pangora dora Semper, 1899; Pericallia dora

= Aethalida dora =

Species of moth

Aethalida dora is a moth of the family Erebidae described by Georg Semper in 1899. It is found on Mindanao in the Philippines. The habitat consists of clearings in primary forests at altitudes ranging from 200 to 1,300 meters (660 to 4,270 ft).

Adults have been recorded on wing from April to May and from July to December.
