= Pitumpanua =

- Kecamatan and town
- Location in Sulawesi Pitumpanua (Indonesia)
- Coordinates: 3°48′0″S 120°20′9″E
- Country: Indonesia
- Province: South Sulawesi
- Regency: Wajo Regency
- Time zone: UTC+7 (WIB)

Pitumpanua is a small town and kecamatan in the Wajo Regency of South Sulawesi Province, Indonesia. The town is located on the eastern coast of South Sulawesi on the Gulf of Boni. The Keera River (Salo Keera) flows through this area and into the sea.

== History ==
Historically, Pitampanua was inhabited by the Wajo peoples who in the 18th century faced hostility in the region. On September 5, 1915, a Christian mission was sent into Pitumpanua.
