= Sengkang, Indonesia =

Capital of Wajo Regency, South Sulawesi Province, Indonesia

Coordinates: 4°7′35″S 120°1′55″E

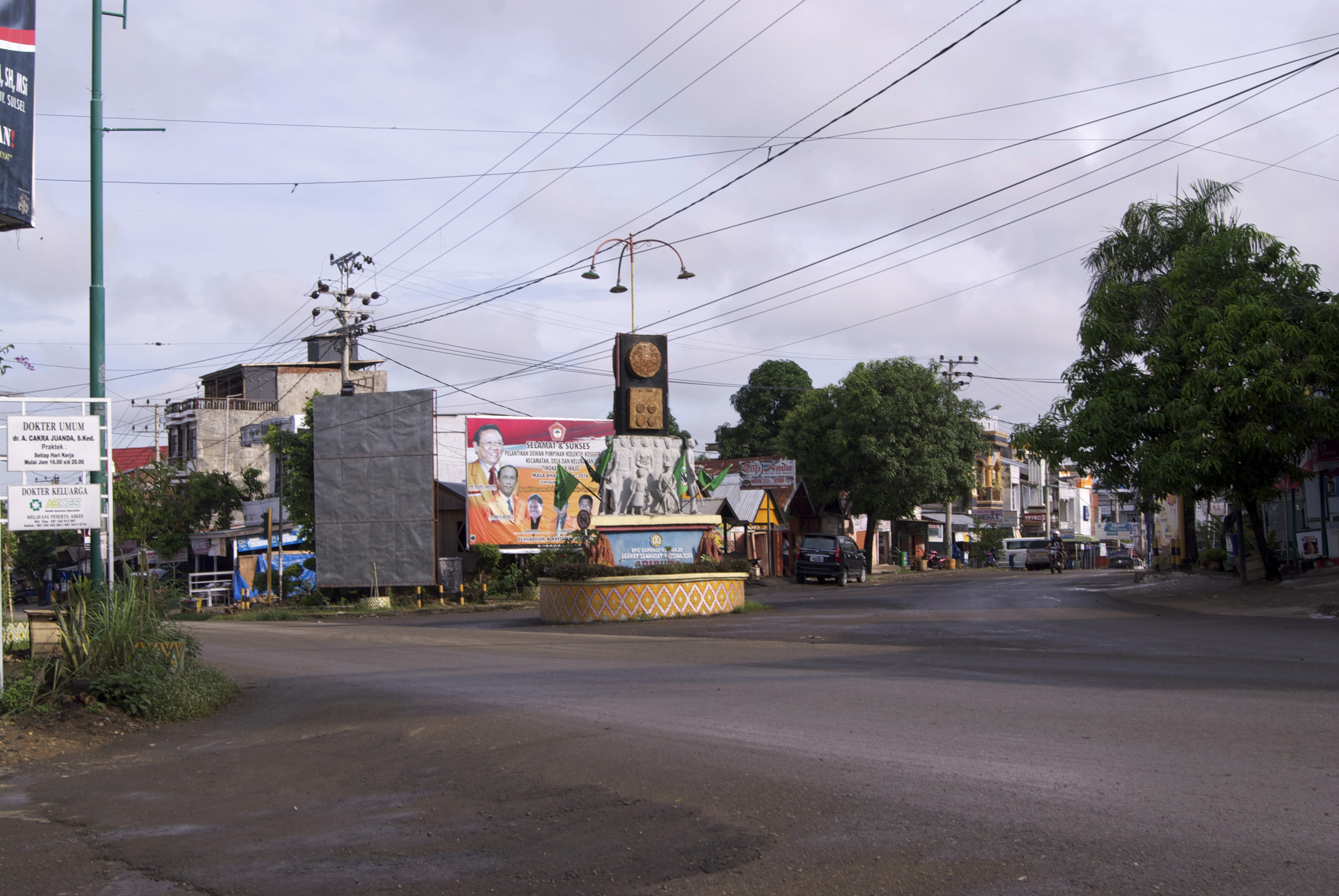
The town centre of Sengkang

Sengkang is a town in the South Sulawesi province of Indonesia and it is the seat (capital) of Wajo Regency. It lies on the east side of Lake Tempe. The Tempe District which includes Sengkang and its adjacent urban area covers 46.92 km^{2} and held 64,320 inhabitants at the 2020 Census, rising to an estimated 69,439 in mid 2025, divided among 16 urban villages (kelurahan), of which Sengkang is the most central.

== Climate ==
Sengkang has a tropical rainforest climate (Af) with moderate to heavy rainfall year-round.

Climate data for Sengkang
Month	Jan	Feb	Mar	Apr	May	Jun	Jul	Aug	Sep	Oct	Nov	Dec	Year
Mean daily maximum °C (°F)	30.1 (86.2)	30.2 (86.4)	30.6 (87.1)	31.0 (87.8)	31.1 (88.0)	30.7 (87.3)	30.5 (86.9)	31.3 (88.3)	31.8 (89.2)	32.3 (90.1)	31.5 (88.7)	30.5 (86.9)	31.0 (87.7)
Daily mean °C (°F)	26.5 (79.7)	26.7 (80.1)	26.9 (80.4)	27.1 (80.8)	27.2 (81.0)	26.6 (79.9)	26.0 (78.8)	26.3 (79.3)	26.7 (80.1)	27.3 (81.1)	27.3 (81.1)	26.8 (80.2)	26.8 (80.2)
Mean daily minimum °C (°F)	23.0 (73.4)	23.3 (73.9)	23.2 (73.8)	23.2 (73.8)	23.3 (73.9)	22.5 (72.5)	21.5 (70.7)	21.4 (70.5)	21.7 (71.1)	22.4 (72.3)	23.1 (73.6)	23.2 (73.8)	22.7 (72.8)
Average rainfall mm (inches)	139 (5.5)	123 (4.8)	120 (4.7)	210 (8.3)	237 (9.3)	197 (7.8)	186 (7.3)	130 (5.1)	125 (4.9)	109 (4.3)	113 (4.4)	162 (6.4)	1,851 (72.8)
Source: Climate-Data.org

== Gallery ==
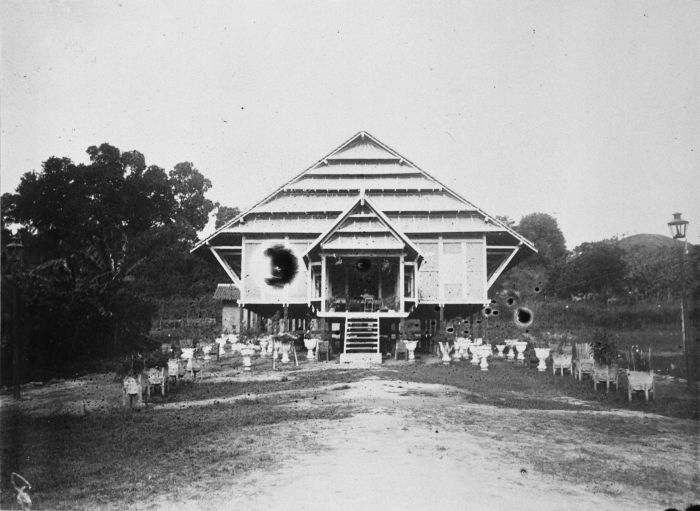
The palace of a prince in Sengkang in the 1930s

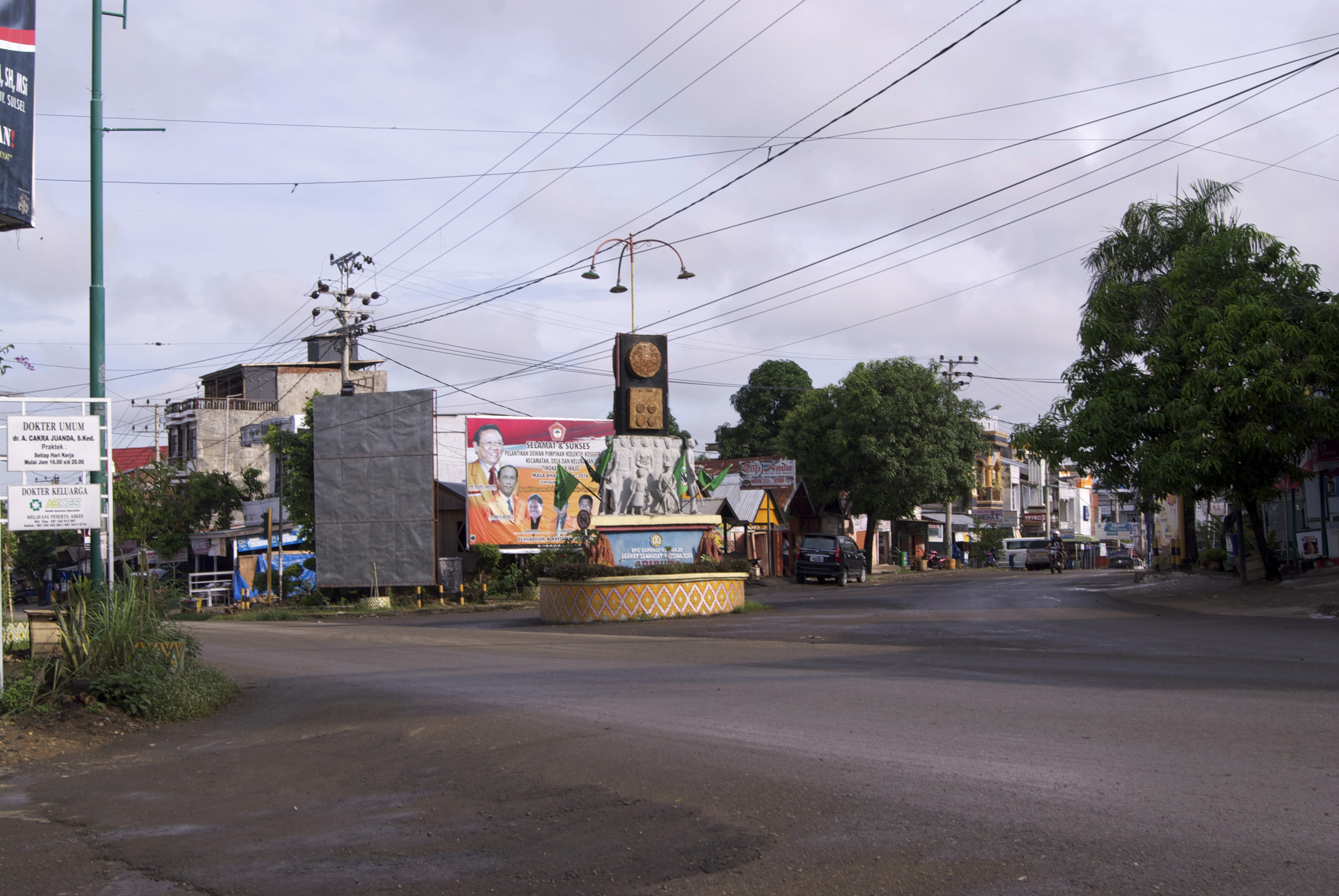
The town centre of Sengkang
