= Selayar Strait =

- Selat Selayar (Indonesian)
- Sulawesi island and Selat Strait
- Coordinates: 5°37′36″S 120°26′37″E
- Type: strait
- Basin countries: Indonesia
- References: Selat Selayar: Indonesia National Geospatial-Intelligence Agency, Bethesda, MD, USA

Selayar Strait separates Selayar Island from Cape Bira of the main island South Sulawesi Province, Indonesia. Within the strait lies Kambing Island and Pulau Pasitanete. Ferry is operating between islands in Selayar Strait.
