= Selayar Islands =

Archipelago in Indonesia

Coordinates: 6°0′S 120°30′E

Selayar or Saleyer (Indonesian: Kabupaten Selayar, Dutch: Saleijer), is an archipelago of South Sulawesi province, Indonesia. It lies in the Flores Sea, between Sulawesi and Flores, around 150 km southeast of the major city of Makassar. Kabupaten Selayar is the Regency, covering 1,357 km^{2} with a population of about 139,145 in mid 2022. There are 73 islands, the main one being Selayar Island. To the east lies Pulau (Island) Kalaotoa and Pulau Karompa Lompo (in Sulawesi Tenggara province), and to the west lies Kepulauan Sabalana (the Sabalana Islands). It is a biodiverse diving site.

== Islands ==
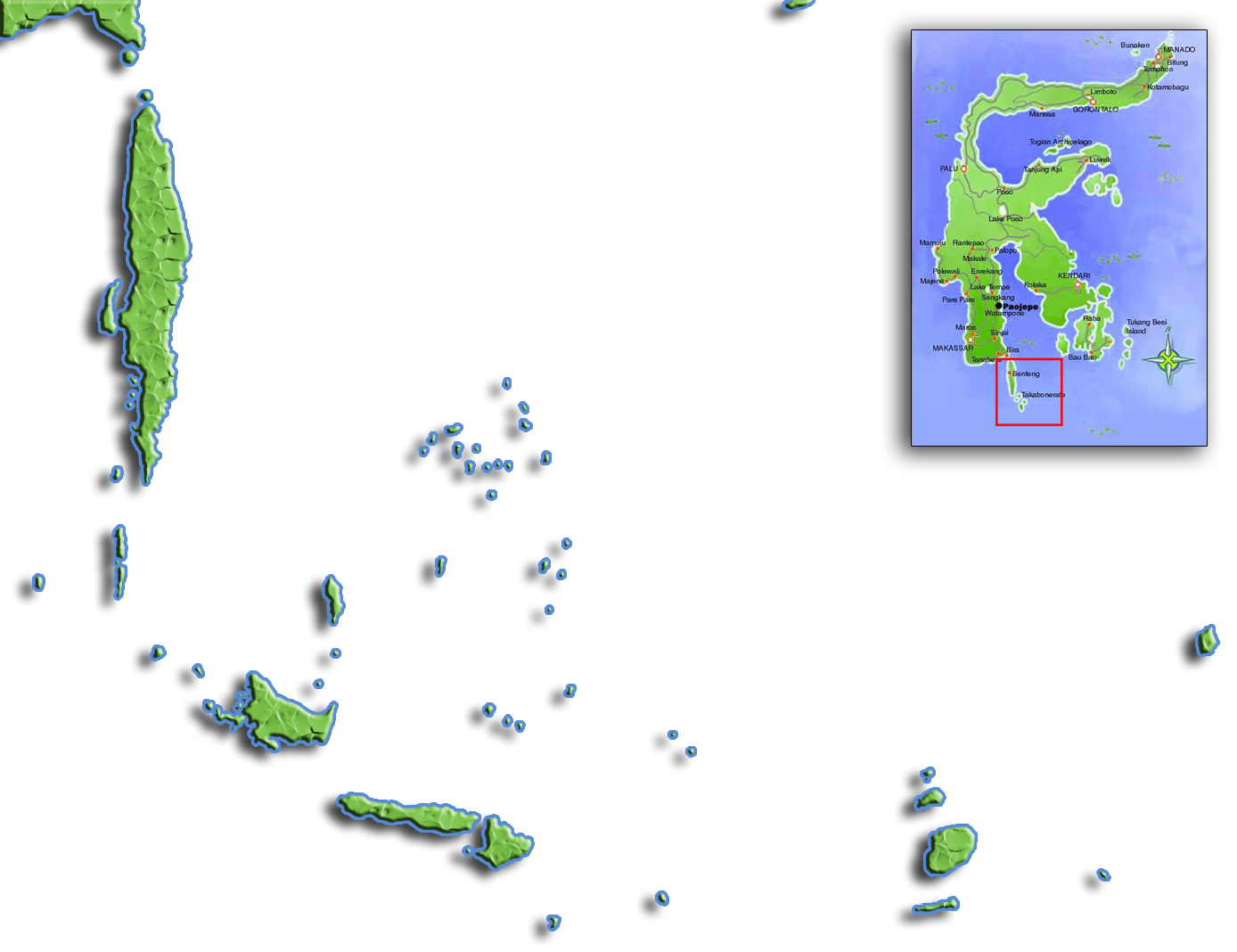
Map showing the location of the islands

- Selayar Island
- Pulau Pulasi
- Pulau Tambalongang
- Pulau Tanah Jampea
- Pulau Batu
- Pulau Kayuadi
- Pulau Panjang
- Macan Islands Islands include Latondu, Rajuni, Timabo, Pasi Tallu, and Taka Lamungan.
- Pulau Kalao
- Pulau Bonerate
- Bahuluang

The Selayar Strait (Selat Selayar) is more than 100 fathoms deep and, with a strong current, is dangerous for native ships to navigate. The strata of Selayar Island are all sedimentary rocks: coraline limestone, occasionally sandstone; everywhere, except in the north and north-west, covered by a fertile soil. The watershed is a chain running throughout the island from N. to S., reaching in Bontona Haru 5840 ft.,\ and sloping steeply to the east coast.

== Demographics ==
The Selayar Islands population, mainly a mixture of Selayar, Makassar, Bugis, Bajau peoples, and the migrants of Luwu and Butonese peoples, is estimated in mid 2021 at 89,147 on the main island and 48,827 on the islands to the southeast of it. They speak the several Makassaric languages (mainly Selayar and Makassar) and are for the most part nominally Muslims (though many non-Muslim customs survive) and support themselves by agriculture, fishing, seafaring, trade, the preparation of salt (on the south coast) and weaving. Raw and prepared cotton, tobacco, trepang, tortoise-shell, coconuts and coconut oil, and salt are exported. There is frequent movement between the area and other parts of Sulawesi as well as to other parts Indonesia. For that reason, and also because of its excellent horses and numerous water buffaloes, the Salayar Islands are often compared with the Kangean Islands in Madura, being of the same importance to Sulawesi as is Madura to Java.

== See also ==
- Wonderful Selayar - Tourism '
