= Benteng, Selayar Islands =

Benteng
- Town
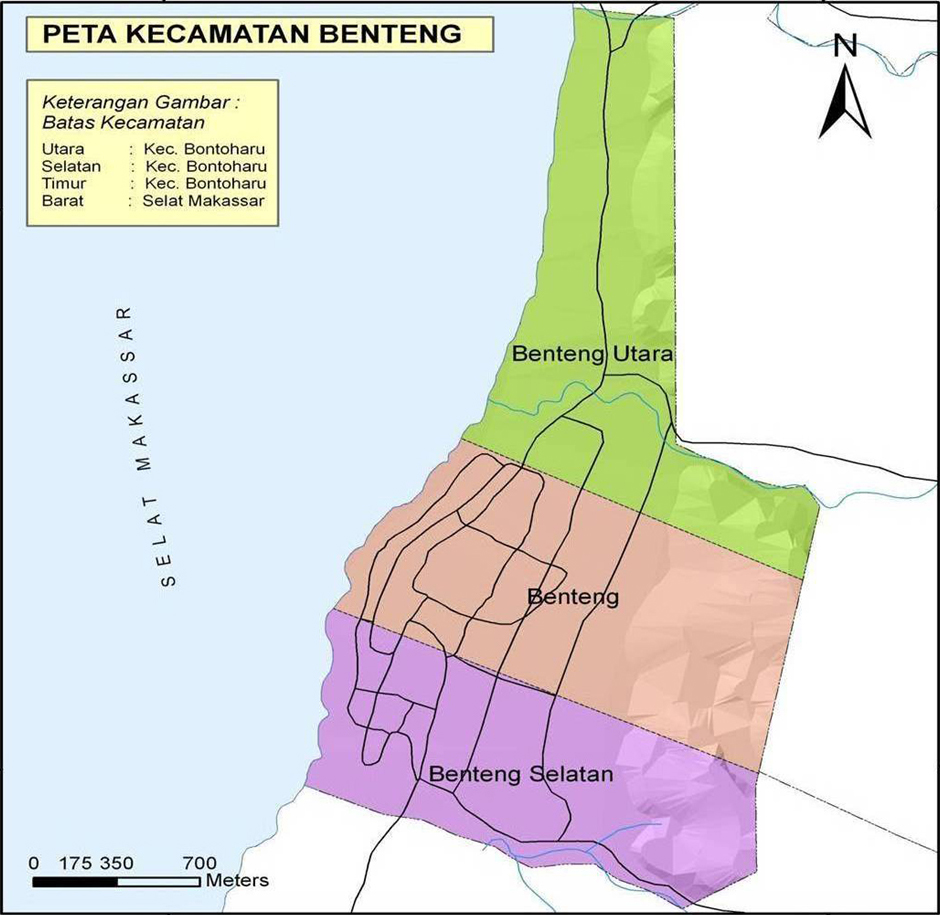
- Map of Benteng

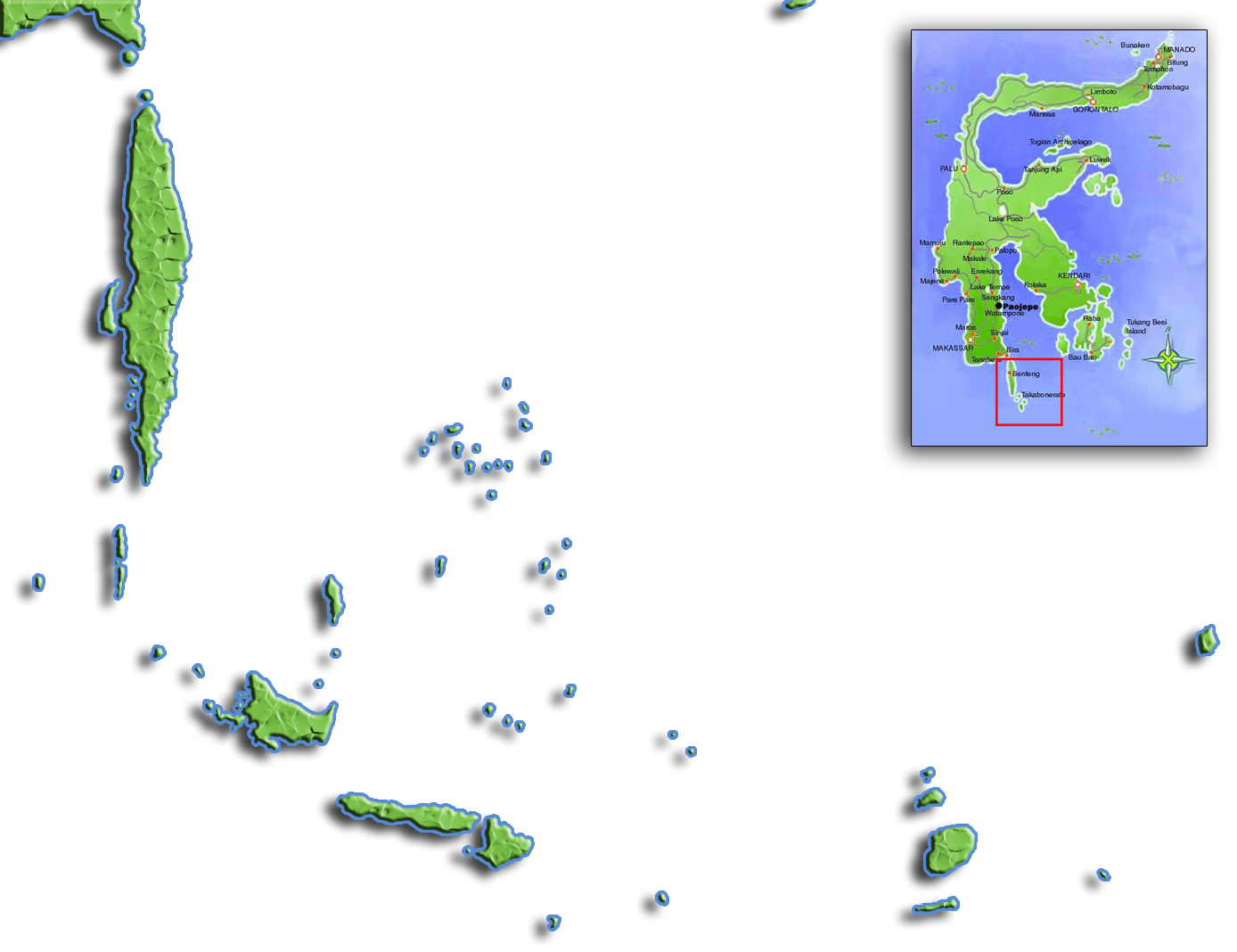
- Location in Selayar Islands Regency, Sulawesi and Indonesia Benteng (Sulawesi) Benteng (Indonesia)
- Coordinates: 6°7′10.73″S 120°27′59.88″E
- Country: Indonesia
- Province: South Sulawesi
- Regency: Selayar Islands Regency

Area
  - Total: 24.63 km^{2} (9.51 sq mi)

Population (mid 2022 estimate)
  - Total: 25,297
  - Density: 1,027/km^{2} (2,660/sq mi)
- Time zone: UTC+8 (ICST)
- Postcode: 92812
- Area code: (+62) 414
- Vehicle registration: DD

Benteng is a town and an administrative district in the Selayar Islands Regency, South Sulawesi, Indonesia. It is the administrative capital of the Selayar Islands Regency and is located on the seafront where the means of transport from outside the closest is Benteng Pier. The nearest airport and is the only airport H. Aroeppala Airport located in Padang few miles south of Benteng Bontosunggu precisely in the village, Bontoharu District, Selayar Islands Regency. It had a population of 21,344 at the 2010 Census and 24,849 at the 2020 Census; the official estimate as at mid 2022 was 25,397.

== Demographics ==
Population growth charts Benteng District

Year	Pop.	±%
2006	17,973	—
2007	18,174	+1.1%
2008	18,540	+2.0%

Year	Pop.	±%
2009	18,860	+1.7%
2010	21,344	+13.2%

Source: Kepulauan Selayar Dalam Angka 2010

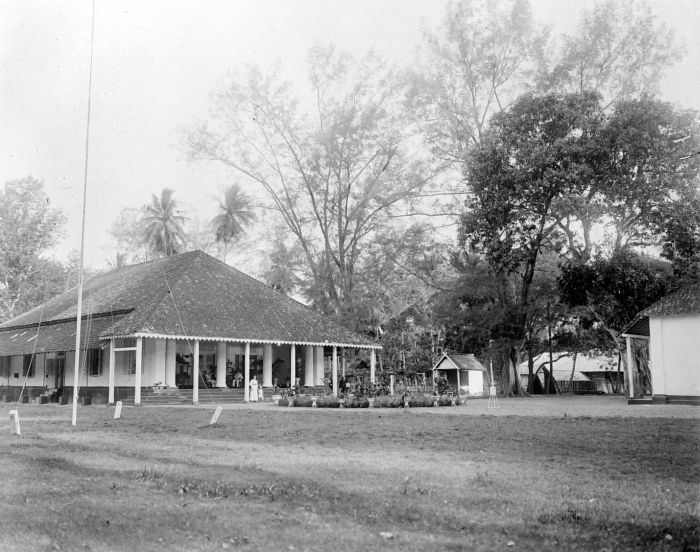
Home office district Selayar Islands Regency in 1900

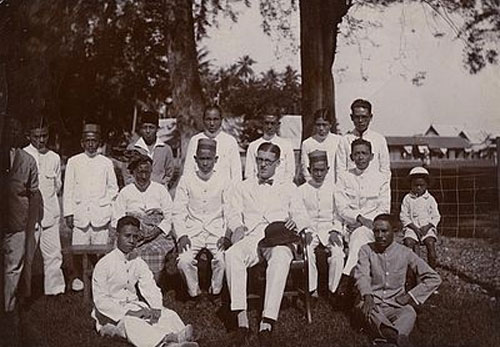
Youth Field Benteng in 1923
