= Selayar Island =

Island in South Sulawesi, Indonesia

Selayar
- Location within Sulawesi

Geography
- Location: South East Asia
- Coordinates: 6°0′0″S 120°30′0″E
- Area: 798.58 km^{2} (308.33 sq mi)

Administration
- Indonesia
- Province: South Sulawesi
- Largest settlement: Benteng

Demographics
- Population: 89,993 (mid 2022 estimate)
- Pop. density: 112.7/km^{2} (291.9/sq mi)

Selayar is the main island of the Selayar Islands (Kepulauan Selayar). It lies off the coast of Cape Bira of South Sulawesi Province. The Selayar Straits separate it from the mainland of Sulawesi. Its principal town is Benteng, while much smaller towns to the south are Tanabau, Padang, Tile-tile, Pariangan, Galung, Layolo, Pa'garangang, Barangbarang, to Appattanah. To the north are Parak, Barugayya, Batangmata, Onto, and finally Bonelohe. The island is over 50 miles (80 km) long and very narrow at the northern and southern ends; its area is 798.58 km^{2} (308.33 sq mi). Benteng is the starting point for diving tours.

== Nearby dive sites ==
From Benteng, there are:

- Pulau Kambing (Goat Island), is located in the Selayar Straits. It has white-tipped and black-tipped sharks, bumhead parrotfishes, scorpionfishes, cuttlefish or an octopus and with luck the zebra batfish.
- Selayar Atoll: 10 min to 1 hour, slopes down to 16 m (52 ft), sandy bottom, sea slugs, Napoleon fishes, pipe fishes, Dugong.
- Selayar East: 1 to 2 hours, pelagic fishes, sometimes manta rays.

== Other sites ==
- Mountain View: at Puncak. 1-hour trip uphill. From here you can see both the eastern part and western part of Selayar's beaches. When the wind blows from the west in Oct-March, Selayarese on the west side buys fish from the eastern part, as big waves smash the west side. And vice versa when the wind blows from the east in April - Sept, the big wave hits the eastern side. People can choose the best place for diving, snorkeling, or fishing all over the year on this island.
- Farmer Villages: 1 hour south from Benteng you can find Galung and Pariangang villages. Here people farm traditionally.

== See also ==
- Selayar Islands — for dive sites not in the immediate region around the island.
- Wonderful Selayar — for Tour & Travel sites
