= Embaloh language =

Austronesian language spoken in Kalimantan, Indonesia

Embaloh
- Malo, Maloh, Matoh, Mbaloh, Memaloh, Palin, Pari, Sangau, Sanggau
- Native to: Indonesia
- Region: West Kalimantan
- Ethnicity: Tamambaloh Dayak
- Native speakers: (10,000 cited 1991)
- Language family: Austronesian: Malayo-Polynesian; South Sulawesi; Bugis–Tamanic; Tamanic; Embaloh
- Dialects: Kalis

Language codes
- ISO 639-3: emb
- Glottolog: emba1238
- Map showing the distribution of the South Sulawesi languages in Sulawesi and Kalimantan, Tamanic languages colored in dark purple with Embaloh language is in number 3.

Embaloh (Maloh, Tamambaloh) is an Austronesian (Dayak) language spoken in West Kalimantan, Indonesia. Apart from Taman, it is not close to other languages on Borneo, but rather belongs to the South Sulawesi languages closest to Buginese. Many speakers of Embaloh also speak Iban, leading to the adoption of some Iban loanwords into Embaloh.

This language is mostly spoken in Kapuas Hulu Regency of West Kalimantan in the districts of Nanga Embaloh, Embaloh Hilir and Embaloh Hulu.

The Kalis dialect (Kalis Maloh) may be a distinct language.

== Sample text ==
Notes: Normalized orthography with ng and ' instead of ŋ and superscript ʔ (^{ʔ}).

"Aisi antuun indi' mantoan ulu'ulu'. Bopu' poang kule'a dakatoaniak ulu'ulu'," kaingka lalo i Lang Kibo. "Ona'kin, ti'kin matoan bapi!"
"These ghosts never stop asking. I'm getting fed up with their questions to me", said Lang Kibo. "Just watch it, if you started to ask again!"

—

== Bibliography ==
- K. Alexander Adelaar and Nikolaus Himmelmann, The Austronesian languages of Asia and Madagascar. Routledge, 2005.
