= Putussibau =

- Town
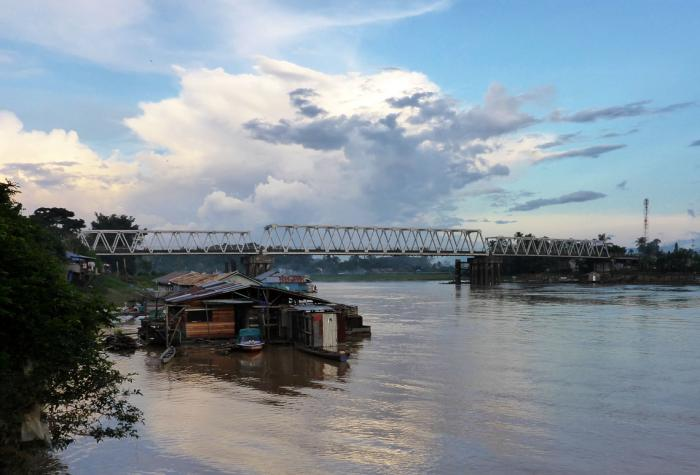
- Bridge linking Putussibau town proper with settlements south of the Kapuas River.

- Location of the town in Kalimantan
- Coordinates: 0°51′27″N 112°55′30″E
- Country: Indonesia
- Province: West Kalimantan
- Regency: Kapuas Hulu Regency
- District: North Putussibau
- Established: 1 June 1895

Area
  - Total: 139.3 km^{2} (53.8 sq mi)

Population (2015 est.)
  - Total: 12,459
- Time zone: UTC+7 (WIB)
- Postcode: 78716
- Area code: +62 567

Putussibau is an Indonesian town in Kapuas Hulu Regency, West Kalimantan. It sits on the river Kapuas, with the main part of the town located on the right banks, or north, of the river. Officially an administrative village (Kelurahan Putussibau Kota) within North Putussibau District, the urban settlement sprawls outside of the primary boundaries to the opposite bank of the river. Official estimates from Statistics Indonesia places the population of the town proper at 12,459 in 2015.

Formerly a remote village prior to its selection as a colonial outpost in 1895, the town grew into its present population acting as a market town far upstream on the Kapuas River. Today, it is the seat and economic center of the regency.

== Etymology ==
The name Putussibau originated from the words putus (to break/split) and Sibau, which is the name of a nearby tributary of the Kapuas which in turn derives its name from the a tree from the Nephelium genus. According to local folklore, a Sibau tree once fell and split the river and hence gave name to the town.

== History ==
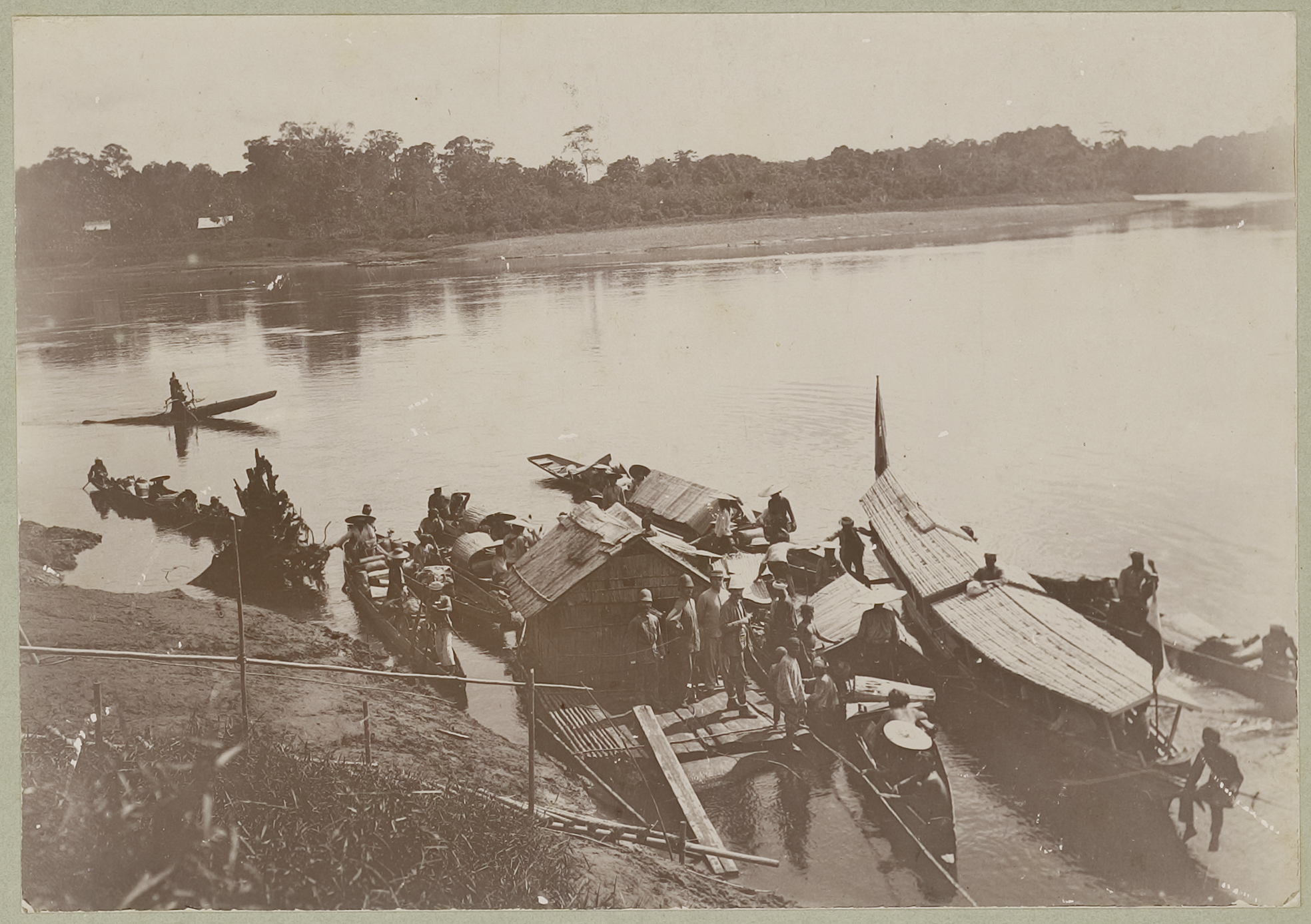
A Dutch expedition departing from Putussibau, 1896.

The area around the source of Kapuas were originally inhabited by the Taman Dayaks. Around the 7th to 8th centuries, an Indianized Hindu kingdom was established by a Kutai noble at modern Selimbau. Initially a small state, the kingdom slowly grew to cover one-fifths of modern West Kalimantan (about 30,000 km^{2}) by the late 19th century. Modern Putussibau was included in Selimbau's territories, and the area received an influx of Kayan Dayaks.

In 1823, the authorities of Dutch East Indies based in Batavia signed a treaty with Selimbau which recognized the latter's sovereignty over what is today Kapuas Hulu Regency. Later on, the colonial authorities began meddling in the kingdom's internal affairs and eventually seized power, with a formal annexation complete by 1925. During the period, at the late 19th century Putussibau was a remote village under threat by headhunters and visited by Chinese and Malay merchants. In 1895, the colonial government chose the site as an outpost to both govern the region and to combat headhunting.

Following the Japanese occupation and Indonesian independence, the town became part of West Kalimantan province. The Kapuas Hulu Regency was established in 1953, and Putussibau has been its capital since. A bridge spanning the Kapuas was built in 1993 connecting the roads on both banks of the river, allowing road access from Putussibau to other towns on the left bank of the river.

== Geography ==
The town is located at the northeastern part of West Kalimantan, close to the Indonesia-Malaysia border. The regency it is part of covers nearly 30,000 square kilometers and is located far inland. With a distance of 400 km from the provincial capital of Pontianak, it is closer to the Malaysian city of Kuching which is located 300 km away. The territory administered by the kelurahan measures 139.3 square km, excluding other villages that also form parts of the urban settlement but also covers much larger amounts of jungle and farmland.

With its source nearby, Kapuas flows south of the town proper and splits the urban area into a northern and southern portion, which are connected by a bridge across the large river. The confluence with the Sibau River is just upstream of Putussibau. The town is also seat of the regency and the district.

=== Climate ===
Putussibau has a tropical climate, and is classified Af according to the Köppen climate classification. The average annual rainfall is 4231 mm.

Climate data for Putussibau
Month	Jan	Feb	Mar	Apr	May	Jun	Jul	Aug	Sep	Oct	Nov	Dec	Year
Mean daily maximum °C (°F)	29.9 (85.8)	30.1 (86.2)	30.8 (87.4)	31.3 (88.3)	31.6 (88.9)	31.4 (88.5)	31.4 (88.5)	31.4 (88.5)	31.4 (88.5)	31.3 (88.3)	30.9 (87.6)	30.4 (86.7)	31.0 (87.8)
Daily mean °C (°F)	26.1 (79.0)	26.2 (79.2)	26.6 (79.9)	27.0 (80.6)	27.2 (81.0)	26.9 (80.4)	26.7 (80.1)	26.8 (80.2)	26.9 (80.4)	26.9 (80.4)	26.7 (80.1)	26.3 (79.3)	26.7 (80.1)
Mean daily minimum °C (°F)	22.3 (72.1)	22.3 (72.1)	22.5 (72.5)	22.7 (72.9)	22.9 (73.2)	22.4 (72.3)	22.1 (71.8)	22.2 (72.0)	22.4 (72.3)	22.5 (72.5)	22.5 (72.5)	22.3 (72.1)	22.4 (72.4)
Average precipitation mm (inches)	404 (15.9)	390 (15.4)	284 (11.2)	375 (14.8)	325 (12.8)	275 (10.8)	246 (9.7)	311 (12.2)	399 (15.7)	428 (16.9)	365 (14.4)	429 (16.9)	4,231 (166.7)
Source: Climate-Data.org

== Demographics ==
The administrative village of Putussibau proper (Kelurahan Putussibau Kota) is inhabited by 12,459 residents within 3,555 households in 2015 according to Statistics Indonesia. The sex ratio of the kelurahan is 111, with a population density of 89.44 per square km. However, urban sprawl spreads to other areas on both sides of the Kapuas, in total forming part of 6 villages within the North and South Putussibau districts with a population sum of about 29,000.

The majority of the population are Muslims, but there are Christian (both Catholic and Protestant) and Confucian minorities.

== Economy and facilities ==
Putussibau is a market town serving the sparsely populated region, with the North Putussibau District alone covering 5,204.8 square kilometres yet only inhabited by slightly over 26,500 people in 2020 (of which over 12,000 live in Putussibau Town proper, with around another 6,000 in the urban sprawl). The South Putussibau District covers another 5,352.33 square kilometres and had just over 23,100 inhabitants in 2020 (the majority of the area formerly comprised the separate Hulu Kapuas District, which has since been merged into South Putussibau District).

It is also the last market town in the flow of the Kapuas, with no other major settlements further upstream. Due to its proximity with the Danau Sentarum and Betung Kerihun national parks, it is also a local center of ecotourism.

Most public facilities in the district, including schools and a hospital, are located in the town proper. STIT Iqra Putussibau, an Islamic educational science institute, operates in the town. The town is served by the nearby Pangsuma Airport, which is located outside the official boundaries of the town although it is only about 3.7 km away. Throughout 2016, the airport accommodates over 73,000 passengers.
