= Tamanic languages =

Tamanic
- Geographic distribution: West Kalimantan
- Ethnicity: Tamanic Dayaks
- Linguistic classification: Austronesian: Malayo-Polynesian; South Sulawesi; Bugis–Tamanic; Tamanic
- Subdivisions: Embaloh; Taman

Language codes
- Glottolog: tama1334
- Map showing the distribution of the South Sulawesi languages in Sulawesi and Kalimantan, Tamanic languages in dark purple.

The Tamanic languages are a small group of languages of Kapuas Hulu Regency, West Kalimantan spoken by the respective subgroups of Dayaks: Embaloh (incl. Kalis) and Taman (Taman Dayak).

The Tamanic languages are not closely related to other languages on Borneo. Instead, they belong to the South Sulawesi languages, most probably in one branch together with Buginese. It is still unclear how did the languages exactly arrive into their present homelands at the deep interiors of West Kalimantan.

== Sound changes ==
Here is a list of sound changes from Proto-Malayo-Polynesian into various Tamanic languages.

=== Consonants ===
- Phonemic mergers:
  - *D merges into d.
  - *j merges into s, but merges into d following *n.
  - *h, *q merge into ∅, however, in word-final positions their outcomes still differ.
  - *z merges into d.
- Lenition in intervocalic positions:
  - *-b- > -w- (sometimes deletes).
  - *-d- > -r- (original *D and *z are also affected).
  - *-ŋ-, *-k- > -∅- in Taman (*takut > ataut).
  - When geminated or following a nasal consonant, the original phonemes remain.
- *l is assimilated to r before r in the same or following syllable (*ulaR > urar "snake").
  - In Taman, *r is further dissimilated to n after *r (urar : uran).
- Development of the final glottal stop (-ʔ) of mostly unexplained origin.
  - *-q > -ʔ, but *-h > *-∅
  - Other occurrences are hypothesized from an original Proto-Malayo-Polynesian phoneme -ʔ.

=== Vowels ===
- *aya, aV > *a: (qi Daya > Embaloh ira:)
  - In Taman, it was sometimes reflected as ɛ: (Malay lain > lɛ:n).
- *u was dissimilated to i before *u in the following syllable (*tumpul > timpul "blunt").
- *ay, *ey, and *aw, as well as *ew, were monophthongized into e and o, respectively.
- *-iq and *-uq became -e and -o respectively.

== West Kalimantan groups ==
Some Tamanic-speaking Dayak ethnic subgroups and their respective languages in West Kalimantan province, Indonesia:

Group	Language	Regency
Kalis	Kalis	Kapuas Hulu
Lau'	Lau'	Kapuas Hulu
Tamambaloh	Tamambaloh	Kapuas Hulu
Taman	Taman	Kapuas Hulu

== Exclusive innovation vocabulary in the South Sulawesi language family or Buginese ==
There are many lexical similarities with the languages of South Sulawesi, for example:

	Proto-Malayo- Polynesian	Proto-South- Sulawesi	Buginese	Embaloh	Taman
nose	*qijuŋ	*illoŋ	iŋəʔ	iŋar	iŋir
self	*diʀi	*kal-aw-e	ale	kale	?
outside	*uda	*saliwAn	saliwəŋ	saluan	saluan
tooth	*ipən	*isi	isi	isi	isi
sleep	*tuDuʀ	*tindo	tinro	tindoʔ	tindoʔ
wake up	*baŋun	*səddiŋ	səddiŋ	asadiŋ	sadiŋ
above; top	*babaw	*babo	asəʔ	aset	?
forget	*lupa	-	lilu	liluʔ	liluʔ
world	-	*lino	lino	lino	?
orphan	-	-	biu	biu	?
rainbow	-	-	tarauʔ	tataraʔueʔ	?
