= Datah Dian, Kapuas Hulu =

Datah Dian
- Location in West Kalimantan and Indonesia Datah Dian (Indonesia)
- Coordinates: 0°53′19.22″N 113°2′22.26″E
- Country: Indonesia
- Province: West Kalimantan
- Regency: Kapuas Hulu Regency
- District: North Putussibau District
- Elevation: 135 ft (41 m)

Population (2010)
  - Total: 856
- Time zone: UTC+7 (Indonesia Western Standard Time)

Datah Dian is a village in North Putussibau district, Kapuas Hulu Regency in West Kalimantan province, Indonesia. Its population is 856.

== Climate ==
Datah Dian has a tropical rainforest climate (Af) with heavy to very heavy rainfall year-round.

Climate data for Datah Dian
Month	Jan	Feb	Mar	Apr	May	Jun	Jul	Aug	Sep	Oct	Nov	Dec	Year
Mean daily maximum °C (°F)	29.9 (85.8)	30.1 (86.2)	30.7 (87.3)	31.1 (88.0)	31.5 (88.7)	31.2 (88.2)	31.3 (88.3)	31.3 (88.3)	31.3 (88.3)	31.1 (88.0)	30.8 (87.4)	30.4 (86.7)	30.9 (87.6)
Daily mean °C (°F)	26.1 (79.0)	26.1 (79.0)	26.6 (79.9)	26.8 (80.2)	27.1 (80.8)	26.7 (80.1)	26.7 (80.1)	26.7 (80.1)	26.8 (80.2)	26.7 (80.1)	26.5 (79.7)	26.4 (79.5)	26.6 (79.9)
Mean daily minimum °C (°F)	22.3 (72.1)	22.2 (72.0)	22.5 (72.5)	22.6 (72.7)	22.8 (73.0)	22.3 (72.1)	22.1 (71.8)	22.1 (71.8)	22.3 (72.1)	22.4 (72.3)	22.3 (72.1)	22.4 (72.3)	22.4 (72.2)
Average rainfall mm (inches)	401 (15.8)	386 (15.2)	291 (11.5)	381 (15.0)	333 (13.1)	279 (11.0)	251 (9.9)	319 (12.6)	404 (15.9)	432 (17.0)	371 (14.6)	433 (17.0)	4,281 (168.6)
Source: Climate-Data.org
