= Taman language (Indonesia) =

Language of Indonesia

Taman
- Native to: Indonesia
- Region: West Kalimantan
- Ethnicity: Taman Dayak
- Native speakers: 30,000 (2007)
- Language family: Austronesian: Malayo-Polynesian; South Sulawesi; Bugis–Tamanic; Tamanic; Taman

Language codes
- ISO 639-3: tmn
- Glottolog: tama1335
- Map showing the distribution of the South Sulawesi languages in Sulawesi and Kalimantan, Tamanic languages colored in dark purple with Taman language is in number 4.

Taman is an Austronesian (Dayak) language of Borneo. Alongside Embaloh, it comprises the Tamanic branch of the South Sulawesi language family.

This language is mainly spoken in Kapuas Hulu Regency of West Kalimantan.
