= Pegon script =

Javanese-Arabic script

Pegon script اَكسارا ڤَيڮَون
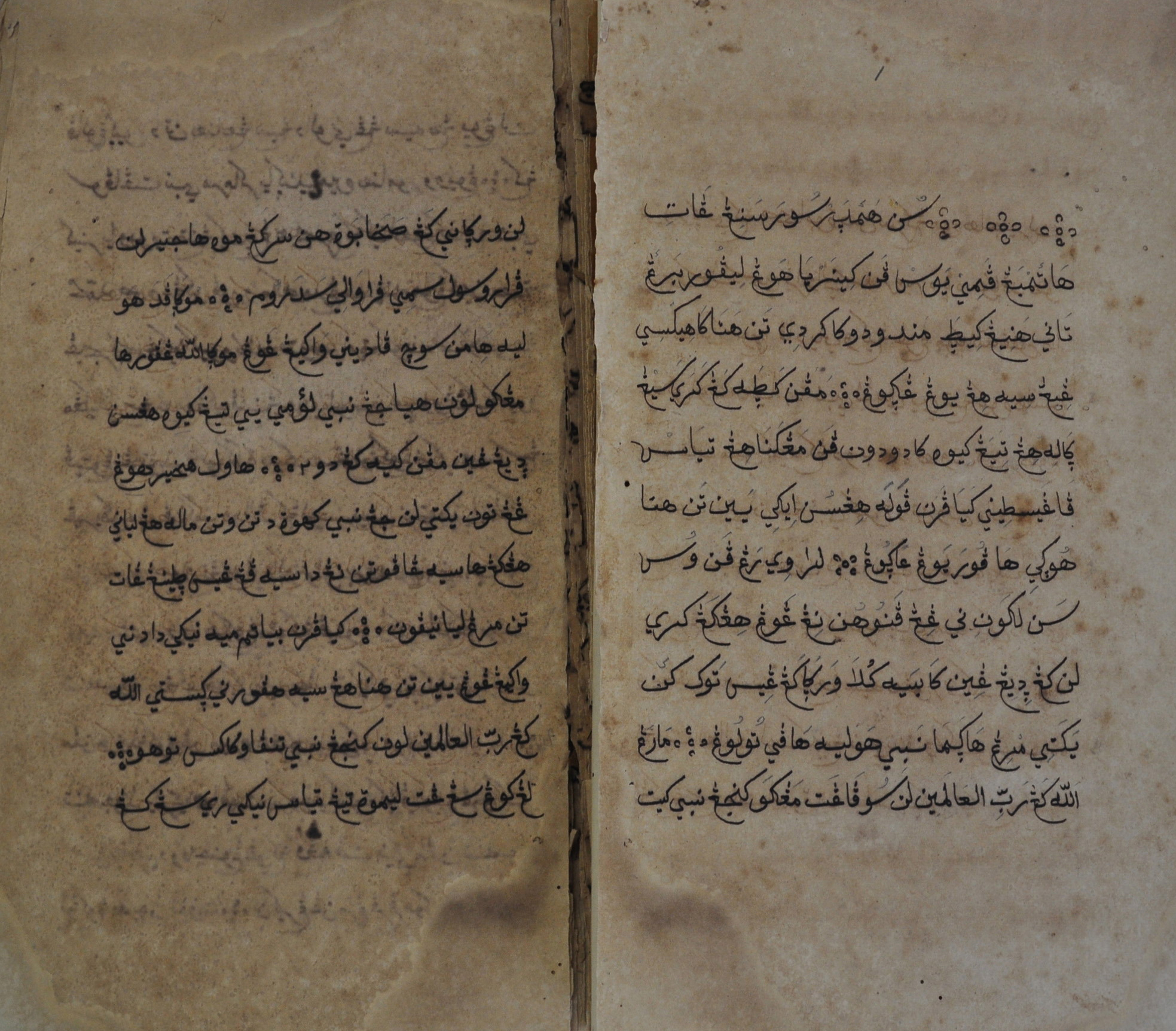
- Babad Diponegoro written in Pegon (manuscript at National Library of Indonesia)
- Script type: Abjad
- Period: c. 1300 CE to the present
- Direction: Right-to-left
- Languages: Javanese; Sundanese; Madurese; Indonesian

Related scripts
- Parent systems: Proto-Sinaitic: Phoenician; Aramaic; Nabataean; Arabic; Pegon script
- Sister systems: Jawi script Buri Wolio; Serang Script; Sorabe alphabet

Part of a series on

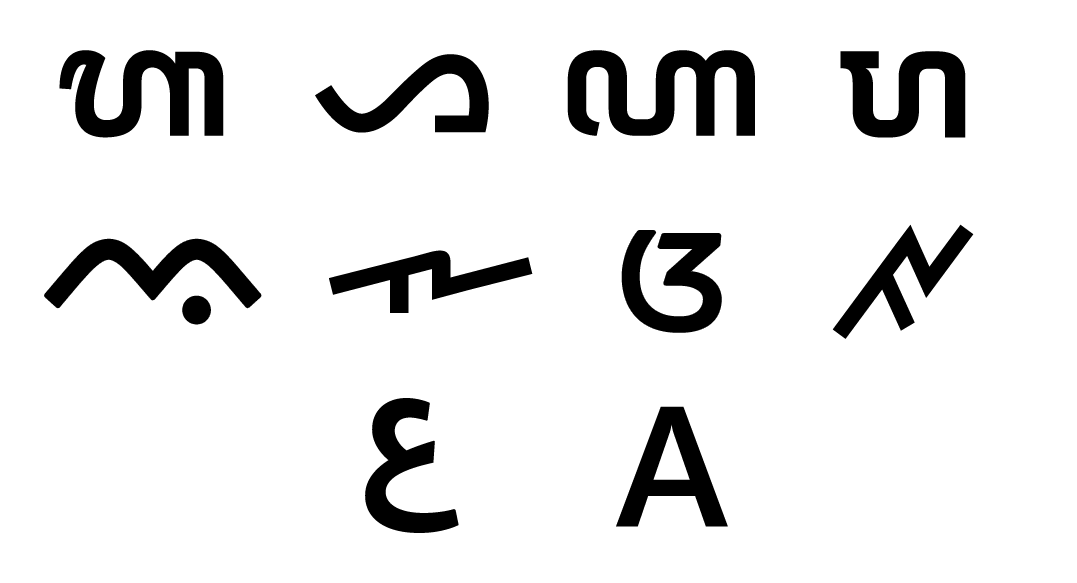

Writing systems used in Indonesia
Abugida (Brahmic)
- Balinese
- Batak
- Buda
- Javanese
- Kawi
- Lontara (Satera Jontal, Mbojo)
- Makasar
- Sasak
- Sundanese (Old Sundanese)
- Ulu (Incung, Komering, Lampung, Lembak,
- Ogan, Pasemah, Rejang, Serawai)
Abjad
- Buri Wolio
- Jawi
- Jawoe
- Pegon
Alphabet
- Latin (Van Ophuijsen, Suwandi, EYD)
Others
- Alifuru
- Bonda
- Cia-Cia
- Bilang-bilang
- Dunging
Related
- List of writing systems of Indonesia
- Languages of Indonesia

Pegon (Javanese and Sundanese: اَكسارا ڤَيڮَون, romanized: Aksara Pégon; also known as اَبجَد ڤَيڮَون, Abjad Pégon; Madurese: أبجاْد ڤَيگو, Abjâd Pèghu) is a modified Arabic script used to write the Javanese, Sundanese, and Madurese languages, as an alternative to the Latin script or the Javanese script and the Sundanese script. It was used in a variety of applications, from religion, to diplomacy, to poetry. But today particularly, it is used for religious (Islamic) writing and poetry, particularly in writing commentaries of the Qur'an. Pegon includes letters that are not present in Modern Standard Arabic. Pegon has been studied far less than its Jawi counterpart which is used for Malay, Acehnese and Minangkabau.

In the past few decades, the Indonesian language has grown in its prominence and role as the national language of Indonesia. Thus, publishing institutions associated with religious schools have further developed new teaching material, in order to expand the use of Pegon script to Indonesian language as well. The Indonesian language, being a variety of Malay, has also been written by the sister script of Pegon, Jawi.

== Etymology ==
The word Pegon originated from the Javanese word pégo, meaning "deviate", due to the practice of writing the Javanese language with Arabic script, which was considered unconventional by Javanese people.

== History ==
One of the earliest dated examples of the usage of Pegon may be Masa'il al-ta'lim, a work on Islamic law written in Arabic with interlinear translation and marginal commentary in Javanese. The manuscript is dated 1623 and written on dluwang, a paper made from the bark of the mulberry tree.

== Letters ==
Pegon uses the original letters of the Arabic script plus an additional seven letters to represent native Javanese sounds not present in Arabic: ⟨چ⟩, dha ⟨ڎ⟩, ⟨ڟ⟩, ⟨ڠ⟩, ⟨ڤ⟩, ⟨ڮ⟩, and ⟨ۑ⟩. One additional letter is used in foreign loanwords ⟨ۏ⟩ /v/. These new letters are formed by the addition of dots to base letter forms. Pegon is not standardized and variation can be seen in how these additional letters are represented, most commonly in the position of the dots (above or below) and the number of dots (one, two or three). In more recent teaching material, additional letters have been added in order to use the script for writing Indonesian language.

ʾalif ا IPA: /ə/ /a, ɔ/	bā ب IPA: /b/	tāʾ ت IPA: /t/	ṡaʾ ث IPA: /s/ (Note: Mainly used in Arabic or other foreign loanwords)	jīm ج IPA: /d͡ʒ/	ca چ IPA: /t͡ʃ/	ḥāʾ ح IPA: /h/
khāʾ خ IPA: /x/	dāl د IPA: /d/	żāl ذ IPA: /z/	dha ڎ IPA: /ɖ/	rāʾ ر IPA: /r/	zāi ز IPA: /z/	sīn س IPA: /s/
syīn ش IPA: /ʃ/	ṣād ص IPA: /s/	ḍād ض IPA: /d/	ṭāʾ ط IPA: /t/	tha ڟ IPA: /ʈ/	ẓāʾ ظ IPA: /z/	ʿain ع IPA: /ʔ/
ġain غ IPA: /ɣ/	nga ڠ IPA: /ŋ/	fāʾ ف IPA: /f/	pa ڤ ف IPA: p	qāf ق IPA: /q/	kaf ك IPA: /k/ /ʔ/	gaf ڬ ڮ IPA: /g/
lām ل IPA: /l/	mīm م IPA: /m/	nūn ن IPA: /n/	nya ۑ ڽ IPA: /ɲ/	wāu و IPA: /w/ /u, o, ɔ/	hāʾ ه IPA: /h/	yāʾ ي IPA: /j/ /i, e, ɛ/

== Representation of vowels ==
=== Vowel diacritics ===
Arabic script is an impure abjad, meaning that for the most part, only consonants are written. Arabic has three vowels, which may be short or long. There are three letters in Arabic (ا ,و ,ي) that can also represent long vowels, but in general, short vowel diacritics are only used in religious texts and texts meant for beginner learners. The phonology of Javanese, Sundanese, and Madurese is quite different. There are six vowels, and no marking of vowel length. So, the script has been adapted by using the vowel diacritics in conjunction with و ,ي, and ا to fully represent the vowels of the languages of Java.

The prevalence of diacritic marking in Pegon varies from marking every letter, to being present only to differentiate particular vowel sounds. A version of the script which uses few diacritics, is called bare or bald (Javanese: ڮونڎول; ꦒꦸꦤ꧀ꦝꦸꦭ꧀, romanized: gundhul). To a fluent reader, the base letters are often sufficient to recognise word, rendering the diacritics unnecessary. So, for example, the word "Indonesia" may be written fully vocalised, (اِنْڎَوْنَيْسِيْيَا, Indhonésia) or bare (إنڎَونَيسييا). It is increasingly common in printed books to only consistently use the e-pepêt, with the other diacritics only used when disambiguation is needed.

Full marking of letters is common in most formal texts, including religious texts and historic diplomatic manuscripts.

Vowel diacritics
fatḥah ◌َ (Note: The diacritics ⟨◌َ⟩, ⟨◌ِ⟩ and ⟨◌ُ⟩ are sometimes used on their own to represent the independent vowels a, i, and u, especially in religious texts.) (Note: A fatḥah differentiates ⟨é⟩ from ⟨i⟩ or ⟨o⟩ from ⟨u⟩)	kasrah ◌ِ	ḍammah ◌ُ	pepet ۤ◌ (Note: Different from a maddah ◌ٓ, which historic texts sometimes distinguish from ۤ◌.)	sukūn ◌ْ (Note: A sukūn indicates that a consonant is part of the preceding syllable and not the beginning of a new one.)

=== Syllables ===
A vowel at the beginning of a word is indicated by the letter alif ⟨ا⟩, plus diacritic, and a follow-up letter ⟨و⟩ or ⟨ي⟩ if required. If present, the follow-up letter is written with a sukun to indicate that it is part of the first syllable and not the start of a new one. A vowel following a consonant (such as the letter ⟨ك⟩ in the example below), a following vowel is indicated by diacritics but without the letter alif.

Vowel syllables
vowel		◌َ a IPA: /a/, /ɔ/ (Note: In the prestige dialect of Surakarta, ⟨a⟩ is pronounced [ɔ] in word-final open syllables, and in any open penultimate syllable before such an [ɔ].)	◌ِ i IPA: /i/	◌ُو u IPA: /u/	◌َي e, ai IPA: /e/, /ɛ/	◌َو o, au IPA: /o/, /ɔ/	ۤ◌ ê IPA: /ə/
word initial	bare	أ ا + ء	إ ء + ا	او	اَيـ	اَ	اۤ
word initial	vocalised	اَ ◌َ + ا (Note: The bare version of this vowel may also appear in vocalised texts.)	اِ ◌ِ + ا	اُوْ ◌ُ + او ◌ْ +	اَيْـ اَيـ ◌ْ +	اَوْ‌ + اَ ◌ْ + و +	اۤ
ك + vowel	bare	كا	كي	كو	كَي	كَو	كۤ
ك + vowel	vocalised	كَا	كِيْ	كُوْ	كَيْ	كَوْ	كۤ

=== Consonant clusters ===
In pegon, consonant clusters are written in two ways. In clusters that consist of a nasal consonant followed by a liquid consonant, such as [mr], [ml], or [ŋl], or of an obstruent consonant followed by a plosive consonant, such as [tr], [pl], or [by], the first consonant is modified by an epenthetic e-pepet ⟨ۤ◌⟩.

When a consonant cluster consists of a nasal consonant followed by a plosive consonant, like [nj], [mb], or [nd], a prothetic alif is added to the beginning of the cluster.

Some consonant clusters
with epenthetic ۤ◌					with prothetic اَ		
كۤر kr	كۤل kl	مۤل ml	ڠۤل ngl	سۤر sr	اَنْج nj	اَمب mb	اَند nd

=== Vowel sequences ===
Vowel sequences follow certain general conventions. Variations besides these are also commonly seen in various books and manuscripts.

Vowel sequences (both bare and vocalised forms)
bare						vocalised					
اأ aa	ائَي ae	اأۤ aê	ائي ai	أَوْ ao	أو au	◌َاأ aa	◌َائَيْ ae	◌َااۤ aê	◌َائِيْ ai	◌َاَوْ ao	◌َاُوْ au
◌َيئا ea	◌َييا ea	يئَو eo	يئو eu	ۤ◌ئي êi		◌َيْئَا ea	◌َيْيَا ea	◌َيْئَوْ eo	◌ِيْئُوْ eu	ۤ◌ئِيْ êi	
ييا ia	يئي ii	يئَو io	◌َووا oa	ووا ua	ؤو uu	◌ِيْيَا ia	◌ِيْئِيْ ii	◌ِيْئَوْ io	◌َوْوَا oa	◌ُوْوَا ua	◌ُؤُوْ uu

== Reduplication ==
In Pegon script, reduplication is represented with a numeral ٢ or a hyphen. If the word has a prefix, the duplicated base word is simply repeated after a hyphen. Otherwise, a ٢ indicates that the word is reduplicated. If the word has a suffix, the ٢ is placed between the base word and the suffix.

Sample Javanese words, showing reduplication.
vocalized	bare	transliteration	meaning
تٓمْبُوْڠ۲	تٓمبوڠ۲	tembung-tembung	words
اَڠْڮَوْتَا۲نَيْ	اڠڮَوتا۲نَي	anggota-anggotané	member who
كَاسُوْرُوْڠ-سُوْرُوْڠ	كاسوروڠ-سوروڠ	kasurung-surung	encouragement

== Sundanese Pégon ==
The Sundanese language has a slightly different system in writing Pegon compared to its Javanese equivalent. While Javanese Pegon has extra letters for writing consonants Sundanese does not have such as dha ⟨ڎ⟩ and tha ⟨ڟ⟩, Sundanese also has the vowel /ɨ/ (eu), Sundanese also does not glottalise final k, unlike Javanese.

=== Consonants ===
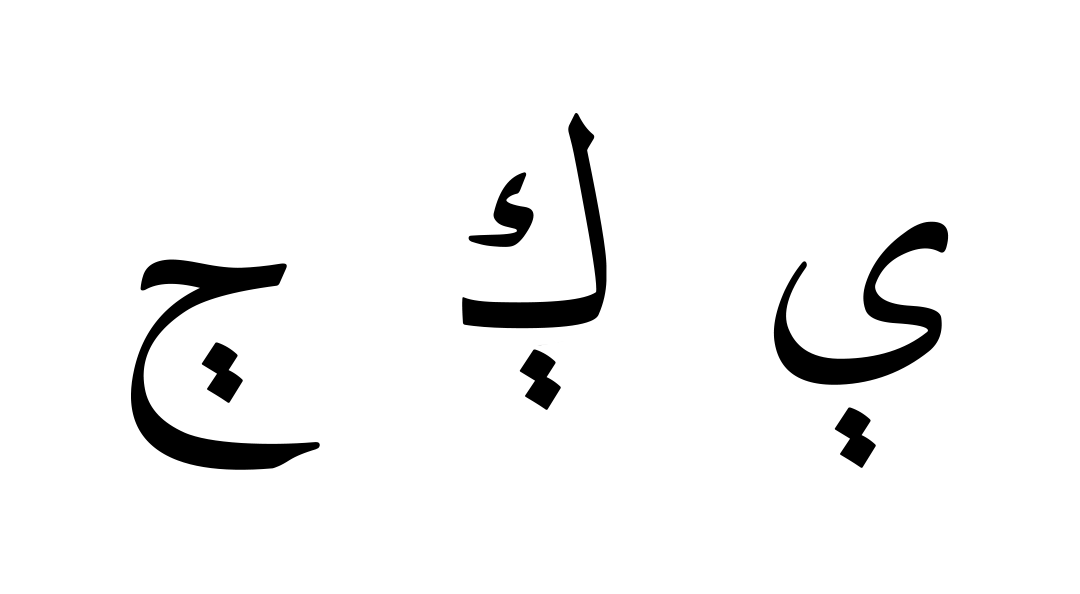
Variants of Sundanese Pegon ca, ga, ya, written using two vertical dots

While Sundanese Pegon is usually written similarly to Javanese Pegon, in some manuscripts and writings, several characters differs, specifically ca ⟨چ⟩ and ga ⟨ڮ⟩, where they are written with two vertical dots instead of three.

Kaganga Order
ka ك IPA: /k/	ga ڮ IPA: /g/	nga ڠ IPA: /ŋ/	ca چ IPA: /t͡ʃ/	ja ج IPA: /d͡ʒ/	nya ۑ IPA: /ɲ/
ta ت IPA: /t/	da د IPA: /d/	na ن IPA: /n/	pa ف IPA: /p, f/	ba ب IPA: /b/	ma م IPA: /m/
ya ي IPA: /j/	ra ر IPA: /r/	la ل IPA: /l/	wa و IPA: /w/	sa س IPA: /s/	ha ه IPA: /h/

Hijaiyah Order
alif ا IPA: /a/ /ə, ɨ/	ba ب IPA: /b/	ta ت IPA: /t/	tsa ث IPA: /s/ (Note: Mostly used to write Arabic loans)	jim ج IPA: /d͡ʒ/	ca چ IPA: /t͡ʃ/	ha ح IPA: /h/	kho خ IPA: /x/
dal د IPA: /d/	dzal ذ IPA: /z/	ro ر IPA: /r/	zai ز IPA: /z/	sin س IPA: /s/	syin ش IPA: /ʃ/	shod ص IPA: /s/	dhod ض IPA: /d/
tho ط IPA: /t/	zho ظ IPA: /z/	ain ع IPA: /ʔ/	ghoin غ IPA: /ɣ/	nga ڠ IPA: /ŋ/	pa, fa ف IPA: /p, f/	qof ق IPA: /q/	kaf ك IPA: /k/
gaf ڮ IPA: /g/	la ل IPA: /l/	ma م IPA: /m/	na ن IPA: /n/	nya ۑ IPA: /ɲ/	ha ه IPA: /h/	wa و IPA: /w/ /u, ɔ/	ya ي IPA: /j/ /i, ɛ/

=== Vowels ===
For word-initial vowels, the letter alif ⟨ا⟩ is used with the approriate diacritic mark, ain ⟨ع⟩ is only used if the word is an Arabic loan.

Vowel syllables
vowel		◌َ a IPA: /a/	◌ِ i IPA: /i/	◌ُو u IPA: /u/	◌َي é IPA: /ɛ/	◌َو o IPA: /ɔ/	ۤ◌ e, eu IPA: /ə, ɨ/
word initial	bare	أ ا + ء	إ ء + ا	او	اَيـ	اَ	اۤ
word initial	vocalised	اَ ◌َ + ا (Note: The bare version of this vowel may also appear in vocalised texts.)	اِ ◌ِ + ا	اُوْ ◌ُ + او ◌ْ +	اَيْـ اَيـ ◌ْ +	اَوْ‌ + اَ ◌ْ + و +	اۤ
ك + vowel	bare	كا	كي	كو	كَي	كَو	كۤ
ك + vowel	vocalised	كَ	كِ	كُ	كَيْ	كَوْ	كۤ

Diphthongs or stand-alone vowels next to another vowel are written with ⟨ي⟩ or ⟨و⟩ as placeholder consonants, depends on how its pronounced, this does not apply to duplicate vowels, they are written with a hamzah ⟨ء⟩ instead.

Sample Sundanese words, bare script
Pegon	Transliteration		Meaning
Pegon	Literal	Actual	Meaning
چاريَوس	cariyos	carios	story
إيٓ	iyeu	ieu	this
مويه	muwih	muih	to return
سٓأۤر	seueur	seueur	many

While the letters wau ⟨و⟩ and ra ⟨ر⟩ in Arabic are isolated letters, in Sundanese texts, these letters are often written connecting to the next letter, usually when followed by the letter ha ⟨ہ⟩.

== Madurese Pèghu ==
The Madurese language has a more complicated phonology than other Javanese languages. It includes the vowel /ɤ/ (â) and a wider range of glottal stops than Javanese or Sundanese. The Arabic script as adapted to Madurese, known as Pèghu, had some differences from other versions of Pegon, and is always written vocalized using diacritics.

=== Consonants ===
Madurese has more consonants than its neighboring languages, including voiceless unaspirated, voiceless aspirated, and voiced unaspirated, but with the exception of dh, aspirated consonants in Madurese Pèghu are represented by the same letters as their unaspirated counterparts.

چ c	ڊ ḍ (Note: As seen here, Madurese place one dot underneath these letters.)	ڟ ṭ	ڠ ng	ڤ p	ࢴ g	ۑ ny

=== Vowels ===
Vowels at the beginning of a word are indicated by the letter alif ⟨ا⟩ or ain ⟨ع⟩ with the appropriate diacritic, and a follow-up letter ⟨و⟩, ⟨ي⟩, or ⟨ء⟩, if required. Usually, this follow-up letter is written with a zero-vowel diacritic (sukūn), to indicate that it is part of the first syllable, and not part of a new one.

Word-initial vowels
a اَ ,أ IPA: /a/ or /ɔ/	i عِي IPA: /i/	u اُوْ IPA: /u/	è عَي IPA: /e/ or /ɛ/	o عَوْ ,اُو IPA: /o/ or /ɔ/	e اۤ IPA: /ə/	‘ ء IPA: /ʔ/

Vowels following the consonant ك
ka كَا	kâ کۤا	ki كِيْ	ku كُوْ	kè كَيْ	ko كَوْ	ke كۤ

== Gorontalo Pegon ==
=== Consonants ===
Gorontalo, a language spoken on the north of Sulawesi has its own Pegon tradition. Gorontalo has a slightly different set of consonant sounds than the other users of Pegon script, namely prenasalized consonants, [mb], [nt], and [ngg], which are written as digraphs.

چ c	ڠ ng	ڠڭ ngg	ف p	ڭ g	مب mb	نت nt	ۑ ny

=== Vowels ===
Vowel notation in Gorontalo is where their Pegon tradition diverges from the languages on the Java Island. There are three major differences. First, there is no distinguishing between "e-pepêt" (schwa) and "e-taling" (regular /e/ or /ɛ/ sound). Secondly, both "e" and "o" are written and indicated with "pepêt" (◌ࣤ/◌ࣦ) diacritics, where the placement (above or below) determines whether it is [o] or [e] respectively. Thirdly, matres lectionis (the letters alif, waw, and ya in their role as vowel) are rarely used, only in specific contexts such as vowel length or writing of a loanword. In this regard, Gorontalo Pegon is similar to Buri Wolio (another traditional Arabic script, further south on Sulawesi Island)

Vowels following the consonant ك
ka كَ / كَا	ki كِ / كِي	ku كُ / كُو	ke كࣤ / كࣤي	ko كࣦ / كࣦو

== Comparison of Pegon and Jawi ==
The orthographic rules of Jawi and Pegon differ, with Jawi spelling being much more standardised than Pegon. Pegon tends to write all vowel sounds of native words explicitly, either with full letters or diacritics, whereas Jawi spelling sometimes omits alif in certain positions where an /a/ would be pronounced, and other vowel sounds may not be written explicitly.

For those additional letters representing sounds not present in Arabic, some letters have the same appearance in both Jawi and Pegon, while others differ. Pegon also has two additional letters for sounds native to Javanese which are not present in Malay. Also the form of kaf used differs between the two varieties with Pegon using the Arabic form, while Jawi uses the Persian form.

Letter differences between Pegon and Jawi
Pegon	dha ڎ dh IPA: /ɖ/	tha ڟ th IPA: /ʈ/	kaf ك k IPA: /k/	ga ڮ g IPA: /g/	nya ۑ ny IPA: /ɲ/	va ۏ v IPA: /v/
Jawi	-	-	ک	ݢ	ڽ	ـۏ

== Transliteration ==
The United States Library of Congress published a romanization standard of Jawi and Pegon in 2012.

== Examples ==
=== Indonesian ===
Explanation of Qalqalah in Indonesian, Pegon script, non-vocalized
كتراڠن:
قلقلة، اياله ممنتولكن بوۑي حرف، يايت سلالو برسوار الاڬي على قدرڽ، سأوله٢ تيدق بنر٢ ماتى، كتيكا ماتی اتو وقف (برهنتی) هُورُوفڽ ادا ٥ حرف، إياله: ق - ط - ب - ج - د
قلقلة ايت ترباڬی ۲ باڬیان، ایاله: ۱- قلقلة صغرى (كچيل) ٢- قلقلة كبرى (بسار)
Keterangan:
Qalqalah, ialah memantulkan bunyi huruf, yaitu selalu bersuara lagi ala qadarnya, seolah-olah tidak benar-benar mati, ketika mati atau waqaf (berhenti). Hurufnya ada 5 huruf, ialah: Qaf - Tho - Ba - Jim - Dal
Qalqalah itu terbagi 2 bagian, ialah: (1) Qalqalah sugra (kecil), (2) Qalqalah kubro (besar)
Explanation:

Qalqalah is the act of bouncing a letters' sound (which usually has a sound) as if it doesn't really stop, when stopping (while reciting the Qur'an). There are 5 letters, which are: Qaf - Ta - Ba - Jeem - Dal

Qalqalah is divided into two parts, which are: (1) Small Qalqalah, (2) Big Qalqalah

=== Sundanese ===
John 3:16 in Sundanese, Pegon script, vocalized
کَرَنَ سَكِتُوْ مِئَسِهْنَ الله کَا اَلَمْ دُونْیَا مُوڠْڮَهْ دَوڠْكَفْ کَا مَفَرِنْ فُوْترَء نُوْ نُوڠْڮَلْ سُوْفَیَا اُوڠْڮَلْ۲ جَلْمَ نُوْ فۤرْچَیَا کَا دِۑَا هَمَوْ چِلَكَ سَرْتَ مۤنَڠْ هِرُوفْ نُوْ لَڠْڮۤڠْ
Karana sakitu miasihna Allah ka alam dunya, munggah dongkap ka maparin Putra nu nunggal; supaya unggal-unggal jalma nu percaya ka dinya hamo cilaka, sarta menang hirup nu langgeng
For God so loved the world, that he gave his only begotten Son, that whosoever believeth in him should not perish, but have everlasting life.

Al-Baqarah 69 in Sundanese, Pegon script, non-vocalized
مڠك اونجوكن بني اسرائيل موڬا ڠدعا ڬوستي بواة عبدي سديا كفڠيران ڬوستي سفيا مفرن كتراڠن فڠيران كا عبدي سدي انو كومها روفنا ايت سفي مڠك نمبالن نبي موسى سئيا٢نا الله نمبالن الله سئيا٢نا ايت سفي ايت كود سفي انو كونيڠ انو كچدا كونيڠنا انو ڠاڬبور چرا امس روفنا ايت سفي انو متك بوڠه متك رسف ايت سفي كا سكابيه انو نڠالي تنا لنترن كاچدا الوسنا سرة كچدا برسيه روفنا
Mangka unjukeun Bani Israil muga ngadu’a Gusti buat abdi sadaya ka Pangeran Gusti supaya maparin katerangan Pangeran ka abdi sadaya anu kumaha rupana éta sapi mangka nembalan Nabi Musa saenya-enyana Allah nembalan Allah saenya-enyana éta sapi éta kudu sapi anu konéng anu kacida konéng na anu ngagebur cara emas rupana éta sapi anu matak bungah matak resep éta sapi ka sakabéh anu ningali tina lantaran kacida alusna sarta kacida beresih rupana
Then the Children of Israel said: "Pray to Your Lord for us so that He may tell us on what color the cow was." Then Prophet Moses answered: "Indeed Allah said: Verily, the cow must be yellow, a true yellow that shines like gold, so that everyone who sees it will be filled with joy, for that color is grand and clean."

=== Gorontalo ===
A short story from the time of the Prophet Muhammad, Pegon script (mandatorily vocalized.)
لࣤتࣤمْبِيْلُ تِلࣤ حَلِيْمَهْ اُوَلِيࣤ مَالَيِلَيِتࣤلࣤ فࣤنُ لࣤ اَللهُ تَعَالَى دُئࣤلَا اࣤلِيࣤ وࣤلࣤ تࣤوْتُلࣤلَا اِلࣤمَتَ لࣤنَبِيُّ الله ۝ تࣤمࣤوْمࣤوْلِيࣤمَئࣤ تُتُولِيࣤتُتُ يِيࣤ تࣤدُلَهࣤي تُوَوُ نَبِيُّ الله يِتࣤ مَايِلُمُوَلࣤلࣤ مَئࣤ وࣤلࣤ وُتَتِيࣤ ڠࣤوْڠࣤتُتُوَ وࣤلِيࣤ تَڠْڬُلِيࣤ تࣦي ضُمْرَة وَوُ بࣤومَئࣤ لࣤلَمِ مَيِ بَتَدࣦ تࣤتِهࣦدُ بࣦلࣦ لِمࣤڠࣤلِيࣤ ۝
Lotombilu tilo Halimah uwaliyo ma layi-layitolo ponu lo Allahu taala duola oliyo wolo tonulola umopiyohu wolo tonulola ilomata lo Nabiyullah SAW. Tomomoliyo mao tutuliyotutu todulahe tuwawu Nabiyullah yito mayilumuwalao wolo wutatiyo ngotilutuwa woliyo ta tanggula te Dhumurah wawu bomao molami mayi batade totihedu bele limongoliyo.
Lotombilu (Halimah) expresses profound gratitude and praise to Allah Ta‘ala for the mercy and blessings bestowed upon her, and she faithfully follows the path and teachings of the Prophet Muhammad (peace be upon him). She recounts in detail the life of the Prophet during her care and describes her experiences while living in Dhumurah (likely the name of a region or locality).

== See also ==
- Jawi script
