= Lontara =

Indonesian palm-leaf manuscripts

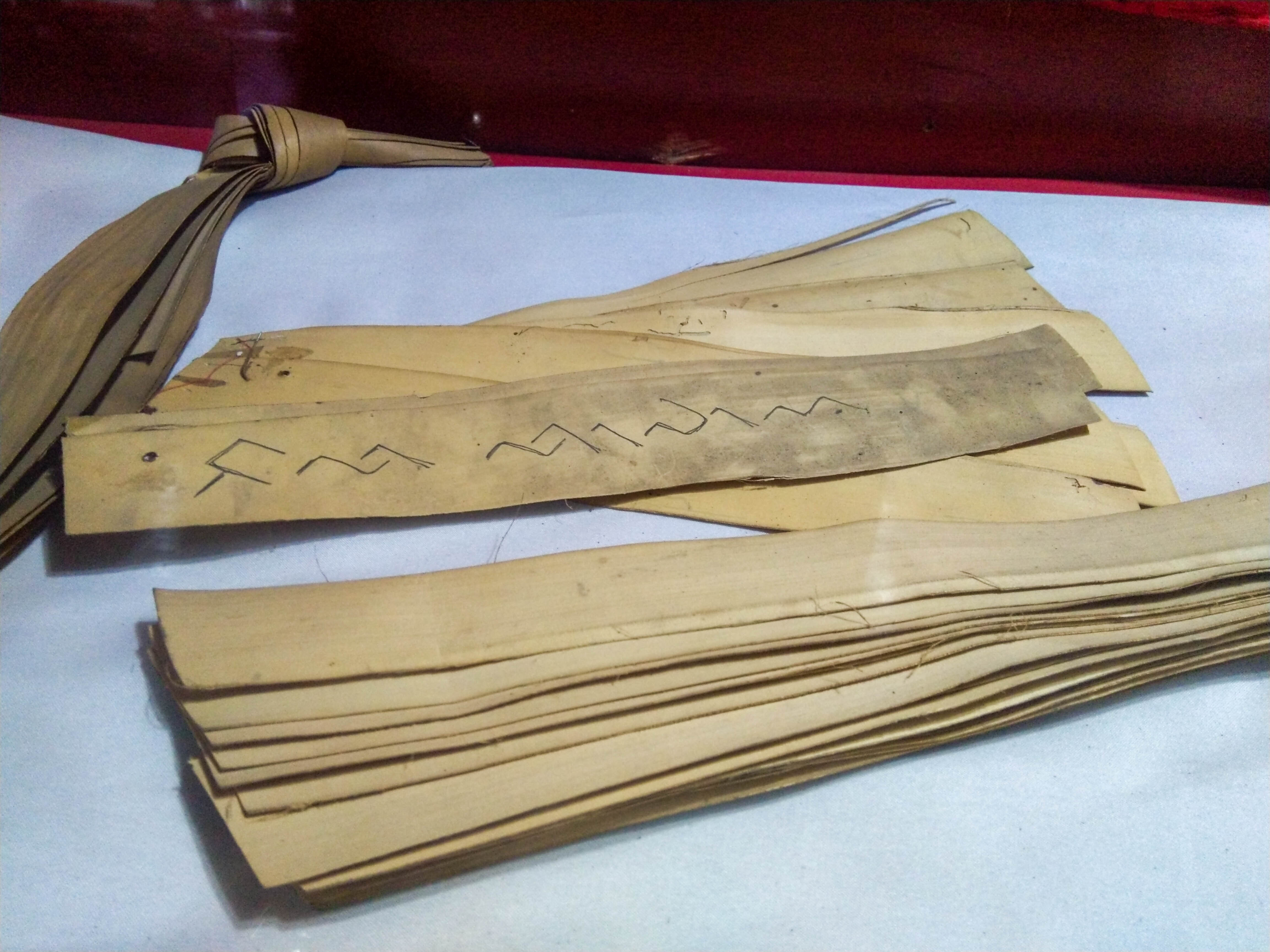
Lontara manuscript at the Balla Lompoa Museum

Lontara or lontaraq (ᨒᨚᨈᨑ) are Bugis-Makassar palm-leaf manuscripts that record knowledge on such topics as history, science, custom, and laws. The term originates from the Javanese/Malay word lontar, which is the name of the palm tree Borassus flabellifer that provides the leaves used.

The types of lontara includes

1. attoriolong (bug) patturioloang (mak) – history
2. bilang or kotika (bug-mak) – characteristics of each day of the week
3. adeʼ (bug) or adaʼ (mak) – adat
4. ulu ada (bug) or ulu kana (mak) – past treaties or texts between kingdoms or countries
5. alopi-lopping (bug) – shipping adat
6. pangoriseng (bug) or pannossorang (mak) – genealogies of the royals.

== See also ==
- Lontara script
- Buginese language
