= South Putussibau =

- District
- Interactive map of South Putussibau
- Country: Indonesia
- Province: West Kalimantan
- Regency: Kapuas Hulu

South Putussibau (Indonesian: Putussibau Selatan) is a district (kecamatan) located in Kapuas Hulu Regency, West Kalimantan, Indonesia. It is situated in the northeastern part of the regency and is part of the larger West Kalimantan province.

== Geography ==
South Putussibau is characterized by its diverse geography, which includes mountainous regions, river valleys, and dense tropical rainforests.The major river in the district is the Kapuas River, which plays a crucial role in transportation and local economy. The district is situated near the border with Malaysia and is part of the larger Putussibau area, which includes several other districts.

== Economy ==
The economy of South Putussibau is primarily based on agriculture, with local residents engaged in farming, fishing, and trading. Major crops include rice, maize, and various tropical fruits. The district is also known for its production of traditional handicrafts, which are sold in local markets and beyond.

== Demographics ==
The population of South Putussibau is predominantly made up of Dayak ethnic groups, who are known for their unique traditions and languages. Other ethnic groups, including Malays and Javanese, also reside in the district, contributing to its cultural diversity. The primary language spoken is Malay, although various Dayak languages are also prevalent.

== Environment ==
The district's environment is rich in biodiversity, with extensive forested areas that support a wide range of flora and fauna. Conservation efforts are in place to protect the natural habitats and wildlife. The rivers and forest areas are crucial for both ecological balance and the livelihoods of local residents.

== Infrastructure and transportation ==
South Putussibau is connected to other parts of Kapuas Hulu and West Kalimantan via a network of roads and river routes. The Kapuas River serves as a significant transportation route for both goods and passengers. The district has a number of small local markets, schools, and healthcare facilities, though access to some services may be limited in more remote areas.

== Culture and tourism ==
The cultural heritage of South Putussibau is rich, with various traditional ceremonies, dances, and festivals celebrated throughout the year. Notable cultural events include the Dayak traditional ceremonies and harvest festivals. The natural beauty of the district, including its forests and river landscapes, offers opportunities for eco-tourism and outdoor activities.
