= Serang Script =

Script for Bugisnese language

Serang or Sérang Script (سࣣيرَاڠ) is a modified Arabic script, derived from Jawi script, used to write Makassarese, Buginese, and other languages in South Sulawesi, alongside Latin and Lontara. It was used in a variety of applications, from religion, to diplomacy, to annals-keeping. Serang was originally created with the entry and spread of Islam into Sulawesi from the Malay Peninsula in the 17th century, adapting to the phonology of the indigenous languages of South Sulawesi. However, unlike Jawi, it did not become the primary means of writing in Sulawesi; and unlike Pegon (Java Island), it didn't even become the sole common script within Islamic religious schools. Lontara script managed to maintain its supreme role in the literacy of Sulawesi (and was eventually displaced by Latin imposed by the Dutch colonial administration)

Serang includes letters that are not present in Modern Standard Arabic (but do have equivalents in Jawi and Pegon). It also has additional diacritics for the display of vowel sounds, and it has conventions on the use of Hamza to write down glottal stops.

The origin of the name "Sérang" remains unclear, but several hypotheses exist. According to some, the term "Sérang" derives from the word "Seram", which refers to the Seram tribe (from Seram Island), because Islam and the Arabic script were supposedly brought by the Seram tribe to South Sulawesi. However, there is no historical evidence that the Seram people brought Islam to South Sulawesi. Furthermore, in Bugis and Makassar dictionaries, the word "Sérang" means slanted and crooked. People who have the archaic knowledge of how to write in the Sérang script say that it is commonly written in italics. This is seen in some manuscripts, where the slanted Sérang writing was used as a means of translating or annotating the Quran. However, in most Sérang script manuscripts, the writing is not slanted.

The Serang script does have a superiority over Lontara script however, and that's been the primary reason for its spread and usage and the limited expense of Lontara script in South Sulawesi. Lontara script has a shortcoming that it does not have a means of writing glottal stops or syllable codas (e.g. when a syllable ends in a -n or -ng sound). In Lontara, these sounds are to be derived from prior knowledge of the language itself and from context.

== Letters ==
As Serang script was never standardized, and it was limited in use, its orthographic conventions are not as solid and consistent as those of Jawi and Pegon. However, with the study of historic texts and manuscripts, there are several commonly used diacritics, letters, and spelling that are discernible.

List of Letters
alif ا IPA: /a/	ba ب IPA: /b/	ta ت IPA: /t/	tsa ث IPA: /s/ (Note: Mostly used to write Arabic loans)	jim ج IPA: /d͡ʒ/	ca چ IPA: /t͡ʃ/	ha ح IPA: /h/	kho خ IPA: /x/
dal د IPA: /d/	dzal ذ IPA: /z/	ro ر IPA: /r/	zai ز IPA: /z/	sin س IPA: /s/	syin ش IPA: /ʃ/	shod ص IPA: /s/	dhod ض IPA: /d/
tho ط IPA: /t/	zho ظ IPA: /z/	ain ع IPA: /ʔ/	ghoin غ IPA: /ɣ/	nga ڠ IPA: /ŋ/	fa ف IPA: /f/	pa ڤ IPA: /p/	qof ق IPA: /q/
kaf ك IPA: /k/	gaf ࢴ IPA: /g/	la ل IPA: /l/	ma م IPA: /m/	na ن IPA: /n/	nya ۑ IPA: /ɲ/	ha ه IPA: /h/	wa و IPA: /w/ /u, ɔ/
ya ي IPA: /j/ /i, ɛ/

List of Vowels
vowel	◌َ / ◌َـا a IPA: /a/	◌ِ / ◌ِـي i IPA: /i/	◌ُ / ◌ُـو u IPA: /u/	◌ࣣ / ◌ࣣـي e, ai IPA: /e/	◌ٗ / ◌ٗـو o, au IPA: /o/	◌ٚ / ◌ٚـي ê IPA: /ə/	◌ْ - IPA: /∅/

In the Arabic orthography, there are matres lectionis, the letters alif, waw, and ya. These letters are consonants, but they serve a double purpose of showing vowel values in some way. As Arabic has 3 vowel sounds, and each vowel sound has a short and a long variety, these three letters are used for indicating vowel length differentiation. In Jawi, they are written subject to specific rules regarding vowel sound and whether or not a syllable is closed; and also subject to long standardized orthography of certaion exceptions. In Pegon script, their use is highly standardized, directly corresponding to the vowels represented, and in fact this is one of the key distinguishing features between Jawi and Pegon. In Serang, at least as seen in manuscripts.

== Sample Texts ==
Below are extracted bits from digitized and publicly available manuscripts, also transcribed in Latin, and translated to English. These texts may contain mistakes or inconsistencies, as that is how they were written down in the mentioned manuscripts.

The first sample, is a Buginese translation of the below Arabic text.

مَا تَهدِيهِ الَيهِ مِمَّا هُوَ مُوْرِدُهُ عَلَيْكَ: تَنَوَّعَتْ اَجْنَاسُ الا الاعمال: لِتَنَوِّعِ وَارِدَاتِ الاَحْوَالِ: اَلاَعمَالُ صُوَرٌ قَائِمَةٌ

اَنُ مَوَدَّ تُوَڠّٚي لَوٗيِ فُوَڠّٚي فَفٗلࣣئِ رِيْكٗ نَبُّواً فُوَاڠٚنَّ مࣣئࢴَئࣣ جِنِسِنَّ عَمَلَئࣣ نَكَرَنَ مُّبواً فُوَاڠٚنَّ مࣣئࢴَئِ اِفٗلࣣنَّ ࢴَؤُئࣣ نَئِيَّيَ مࣣئࢴَئِ عَمَلَ فَادَمِّ تَفَّ۲ تٚتّٗوْڠّٚيࣣ
Anu mawaddatongngi lao ri Puangngé, fapoléi riko nabbua' fawangenna. Ma'gaé jinisinna amala'é nakarana mubbua' fawangenna ma'gaé ifolengna gau'é. Naiyaya ma'gaé amala', fadami taffa-taffa tettongngé.
That which you offer in devotion toward the Lord is merely what He has already brought forth and given to you. The diverse types of your outer actions exist only because of the diverse ways the Lord brings forth and manifests your inner deeds. As for all those various physical actions, they are merely like standing, empty frameworks [devoid of a soul].

The second sample, is an instruction into Tayammum (dry purification ritual in Islam, done out of necessity when water can't be feasibly accessed), written in Makassarese.

نَأِيَّ ࢴَوُكَانَّ بُتَّ نِفَتَيَمُّؤْ بُتَّ مَلُڤُء مَكَنَمَتَنْكَسَأ فُوْنَّ بَاسِي نِسِنَࢴَرَاكِ نَئَلُّوْ تُرُئْفَ نَنِڤَكَبَاجِئْ سَلَفَرَّئْنَا نَنُچُوْرِ‌ئْ تَلُّ نَنِرَنْكْأَ فَلَئِلَيَمْ نَنِّيَأْفَ اَدَّكِّئِ اِيَّمُوْ نِسَفُ اِيْيَ رُفَانَّا اَنَّأْ۲ مَتِئِ نَكِتِئِ اَنْفَتَرَنْكَكِ لِمَانْتَا رِرُفَانَّا تُمِتَّيْ نَكِفٗوْ رُسُؤْ مَنَاوُڠْ كَمَّتُودُڠْ تُمَڠَّلِّئِ جِئَيْ سِنَّا يَڠْ فَلَّئَنَّا نَنَامَفَسِّڠْ كِفَكَلِّپْڠْ رِلِمَانْتَا نَكِرَنْكْأَ فٗوْكِ فَكَئْلِيَمْ بُتَّايَ نَكِسَفُ اِيْيَ سِنْكُلُؤْ كَنَڠْنَا تٗوْ سُـؤْ مَنَاوُڠْ رِكَرِيْمِنَّا نَنَانَوْ كِفَكَلِّپْڠْ رِلِمَانْتَا نَكِفَكَمَّ تُوْدُڠْ فٗوْكِ رِكَئِرِيَّ كَمَّتُودُڠْ فَلَّئْبَنَّا لَأْ بُسُؤْ مِنتُ تَيَمُّڠَ كَمَّمِنْجٗوْ فَرِئْنَا.
Naiya gawukanna butta nipatayammung butta malupu' makanamatangkasa' funna basi nisinagaraki naallu' turu'fa nanipakabaji' salaparrangna nanucu'ri' tallu nanirangka' pala'ilayam nanniya'fa addakkié iyamo nisafu iye rupanna anna'-anna' mati'i nakiti'i anfatarangkaki limanta dirupanna tumittai nakipo' rusu' manawung kammatudung tumangngallié ji'i sanna yyang pallanna nana mappassing kifakallippang rilimanta nakirangka' foki faka'iliyam buttaya nakisafu iyang sinkulu' kanangna to su'u manawung rikariminna nananawu kifakallippang rilimanta nakipakamma tudung foki rikairiya kammatudung fallaybanna la' busu' mintu tayammunga kammaminfo farinna.
As for the practice of using earth for dry purification (tayammum), the earth must consist of fine, dry, soft soil. When the dust is gathered, it is to be thoroughly inspected and shaken out to ensure it is clean. It should be struck three times with the palms of the hands open. One then forms the proper intention (niyyat) before wiping the face completely, ensuring the dust reaches from the hairline down across the countenance. Next, press the hands flat into the soil again, gathering the fine dust upon the palms. One then wipes the right arm completely from the elbow down to the fingertips, ensuring every area is covered. Following this, do the exact same for the left arm, rubbing down thoroughly from the elbow out to the fingers until the entire boundary of the tayammum process is meticulously completed in accordance with the prescribed religious obligations.

The third sample, is part of an instruction into Tayammum (dry purification ritual in Islam, done out of necessity when water can't be feasibly accessed), written in Buginese.

نَئِيَّ شَرَطَّنَ يَتَمّٚڠَّيْ سٚفُوْلٗوءِ مَلُمَلَّنْ اَنكَّفُيِ رِيَتَمّٚڠَّيْ تَنَأ مَادُوَنَّ اَنْكَّفِيْ تَنَائِيْ مَفَچِّكْ مَاتٚلُنَّ دࣣيْفَّ نَسٗوٗءِيْ تَنَأ لَبُّوْ لَبُوْ۲ نٗنِّئَ فَدَءَ۲نَّ رِتُ مَائٚفَّانَّ تٚنَّيْ رِ نْكَّفِيْ تَنَيْ فُرَ فَكࣣ مَلَمِلَنَّ نَكَّتَّائِيْقِ رِتُ مَأٗنّٗتَّ نَسَافُفِيْ رُفَنَّ نٗنِّئَ دُوَيْ لَمِنَّ ࢴَنْكَّتِسكُّوْ نَسَبَ دُوَأٗ فَّاقَ مَفَتِنَّ نَفَلْيَسِڤٚي نَجِسِئِ يٗوْلٗ مَارُوَنَّ نَتٚوَفِّ.
Naiya saratta'na yattammengngé seppuloé malumallang angkappui riyattammengngé: tana. Maduanna, angkappui tanaé mappaccing. Matellunna, de'pa nasuwi tanaé labbu-subbu nennia pada-padaéwna ritu. Maeppa'na, tenniya ríngkappiyé tanaé pura paké. Malamillanna (Malimanna), nakkattaénggi ritu maonnye' na sapui rupanna nennia duwayé limanna gangkanna tennissung nasaba duwaé faka' mafatinna napoliseppi najisi'é yolo maruanna nattowappi.
As for the criteria that easily encompass performing dry purification (tayammum), they are ten: [First], the material used for tayammum must be earth/soil. Second, it encompasses that the soil must be completely pure. Third, the soil must not yet be mixed with water to become mud, remaining as fine, soft dust or things of similar nature. Fourth, the soil being used must not be soil that was already previously used (musta'mal). Fifth, one must intend (niyyat) for it when wiping the face and the two hands, up until it is ensured that the two separate elements are clean, wiping away any prior impurities (najis) first before continuing.

The forth sample, is an islamic description of God's description of his own prophet, prophet Muhammad, written in Buginese.

سِبَوَنِكَرَ۲نَ مَفَّانَ رِفࣣسّٚكِ تٗوْڠٚ سُرٗوْنَ الله تَعَالَیِ ايَّنَرِتُ رِسّٚڠِّ تٗوْڠٚ سُوٗوْنَ الله تَعَالَی سِنِنَّ اِيَّانَفَلَتُّوْءࣣ نَبِتَّ مُحَمَّدْ فٗوْلࣣی رِڤُوًا الله تَعَالَی اَلَفَسُّوٗ اَلَفَفّࣣسَنْكَارِ مَكّٚدَنَّ الله تَعَالَی رِلَلٚنَ فَوُء۲ مَفَچَّنَّ رِتُ «صَدَقَ عَبْدِيْ فِيْ کُلِّ مَايُبَلِّغُ عَنِّيْ» بٚتُّوَنَّ رِتَ تٗوْڠٚ ڠِّ اَتَكِّوْا مُحَمَّدْ رِلَلٚنَّ تُنْكّٚ۲ اَيَّا نَفَلَتُّوْءࣣ
Sibawanikara-karana mappatongeng ri fassoki tongeng surona Allah Ta'ala. Iyanaritu risengngé tongeng surona Allah Ta'ala sininna iya napalattu'é Nabitta Muhammad polé ri Puang Allah Ta'ala. Alafassu’ alafappasangkara makkedanna Allah Ta'ala rilalenna pau-pau mappaccanna ritu: ‘Sadaqa ‘abdī fī kulli mā yuballighu ‘annī’. Bettwanna ritu: tóngéngngi atakkua Muhammad rilalenna tungke'-tungke' iya napalattu'é.
Accompanied by His various miracles, [Allah] authenticates that He truly brought forth His true messenger. Namely, what is called the true messenger of Allah Ta'ala is everything delivered by our Prophet Muhammad coming from the Lord Allah Ta'ala. [By the absolute decree and speech], Allah Ta'ala states inside His holy and pure words: 'My servant has spoken the truth in everything he conveys on My behalf.' The meaning of that is: our servant Muhammad is entirely truthful in every single thing that he conveys.
