= Lake Sentarum National Park =

National park in Indonesia

- IUCN category II (national park)
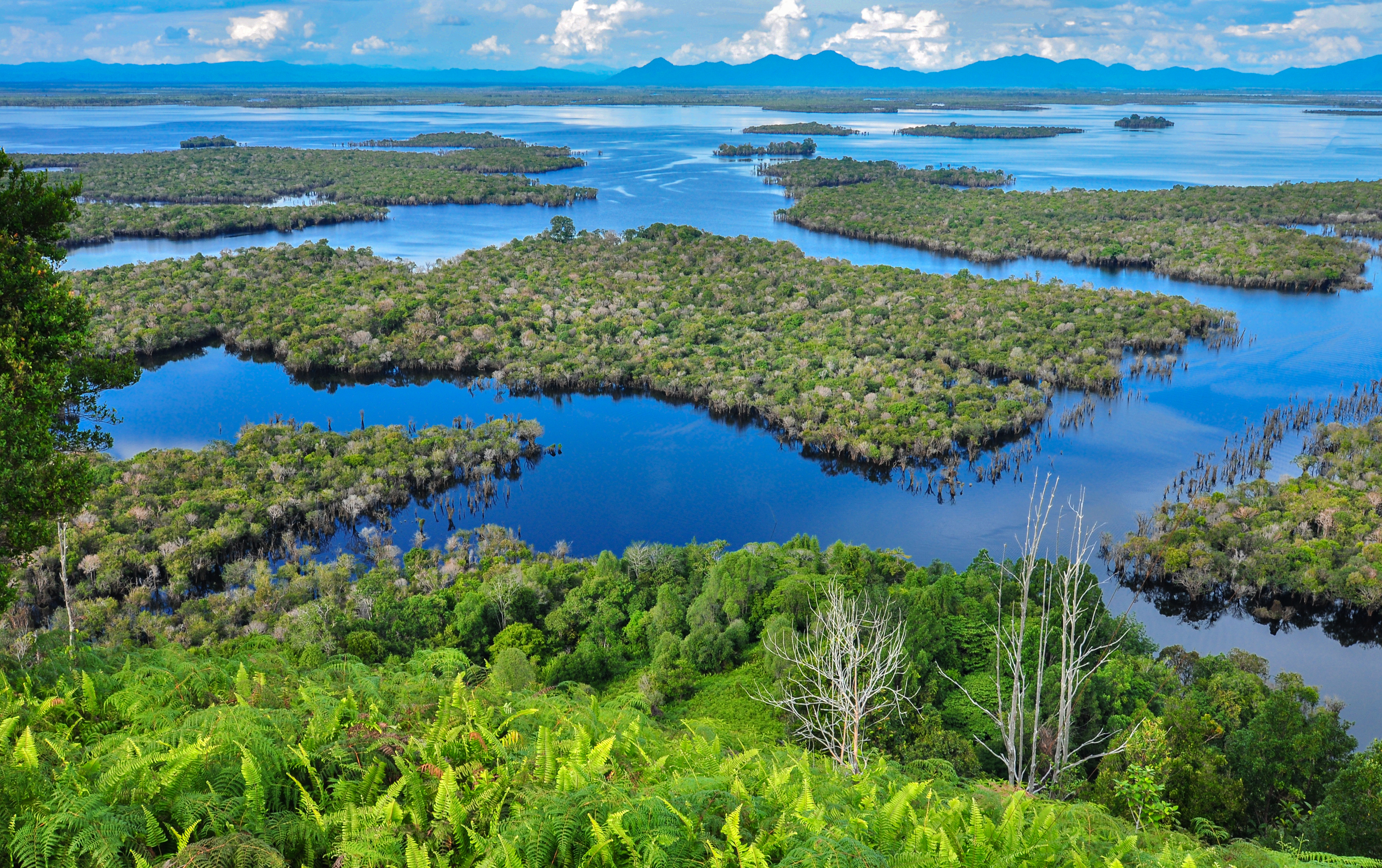

- Location within Borneo
- Location: West Kalimantan, Indonesia
- Nearest city: Pontianak
- Coordinates: 0°51′N 112°6′E
- Area: 1,320 km^{2} (510 sq mi)
- Established: 1999
- Governing body: Ministry of Forestry

Ramsar Wetland
- Official name: Danau Sentarum Wildlife reserve
- Designated: 30 August 1994
- Reference no.: 667

The Lake Sentarum National Park (Indonesian: Taman Nasional Danau Sentarum) is a national park protecting one of the world's most biodiverse lake systems, located in the heart of Borneo Island, Kapuas Hulu Regency, West Kalimantan Province, Indonesia. It lies in the upper Kapuas River tectonic basin some 700 kilometres upstream from the delta. The basin is a vast floodplain, consisting of about 20 seasonal lakes, freshwater swamp forest and peat swamp forest. Local people call it as Lebak lebung (floodplain). The National Park is located in the western part of this basin, where three-quarters of the seasonal lakes occur. Approximately half of the park consists of lakes, while the other half consists of freshwater swamp forest.

An area of 800 km^{2} was first gazetted as Wildlife Reserve in 1982, which in 1994 was extended to 1,320 km^{2} (890 km^{2} is swamp forest area and 430 km^{2} is dry-land) when it became a Ramsar site. In 1999 it was declared a National Park, however a National Park Authority was only established in 2006.

Danau Sentarum National Park has a rich fish fauna with around 240 recorded species, including the Asian arowana and clown loach botia. During a biological expedition, scientists found species of such fish genera as Chitala, Scleropages, Chitala, Channa, Leptobarbus, Parachela, including many new species. There have been 237 bird species recorded including the Storm's stork and great argus. Of the 143 mammal species 23 are endemic to Borneo including the proboscis monkey. There is a relatively large population of the endangered orangutans present in the park. The 26 reptile species include the false gharial and estuarine crocodile.

The lakes support a large traditional fishing industry. The western part of the upper Kapuas floodplain is inhabited by almost 20,000 people, 88% of which are Malay fishermen. About 3,000 people live in about 20 village enclaves within the Park.

== See also ==
- List of national parks of Indonesia
- Heart of Borneo
