= Buginese language =

Austronesian language spoken in Indonesia

Buginese
- Bugis
- Basa Ugi ᨅᨔ ᨕᨘᨁᨗ بهاس بوڬيس/ بَاسَ أُوْڬِيْ
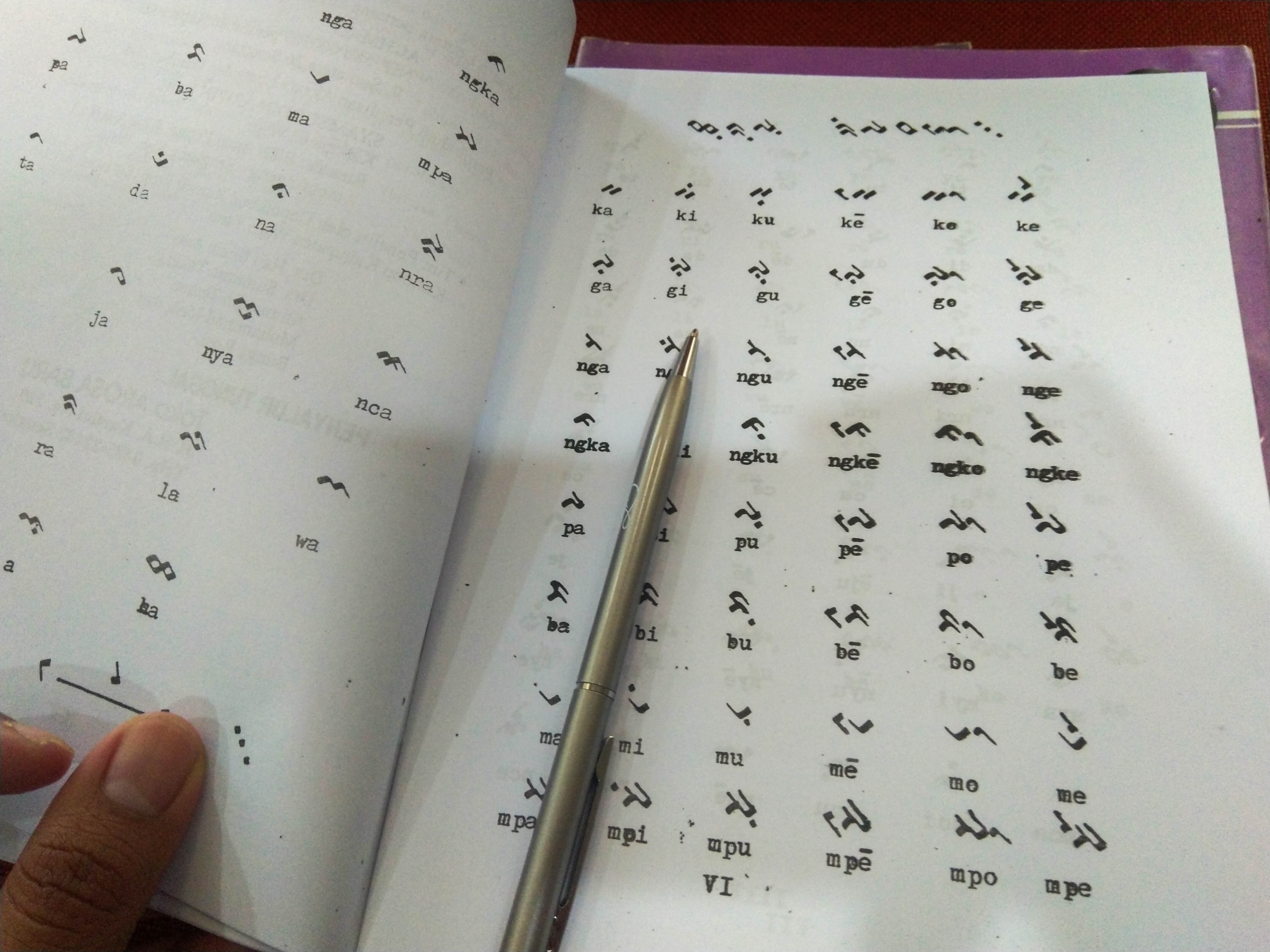
- Bugis language textbook
- Pronunciation: [basa.uɡi]
- Native to: Indonesia
- Region: South Sulawesi; enclaves elsewhere in Sulawesi, Kalimantan, Sumatra, Maluku, Papua
- Ethnicity: Buginese
- Native speakers: L1: 3.5 million L2: 500,000; Total speakers: 4 million (2015 UNSD)
- Language family: Austronesian: Malayo-Polynesian; South Sulawesi; Bugis–Tamanic; Bugis; Buginese
- Dialects: Buginese dialects
- Writing system: Latin script (Buginese Latin alphabet); Lontara script Serang script

Official status
- Regulated by: Badan Pengembangan dan Pembinaan Bahasa

Language codes
- ISO 639-2: bug
- ISO 639-3: bug
- Glottolog: bugi1244
- The distribution of Buginese and Campalagian speakers throughout Sulawesi

Buginese (/bʊɡɪˈniːz, -ɡə-/; Basa Ugi, Lontara script: ᨅᨔ ᨕᨘᨁᨗ, Serang script: بهاس بوڬيس/ بَاسَ أُوْࢴِيْ, pronounced [basa.uɡi]), or simply Bugis, is an Austronesian language spoken by about 4 million people, mainly in the southern part of Sulawesi, Indonesia. It is the mother tongue of the Buginese people.

== History ==
The word Buginese derives from the word Bahasa Bugis in Malay. In Buginese, it is called Basa Ugi while the Bugis people are called To Ugi. According to a Buginese myth, the term Ugi is derived from the name to the first king of Cina, an ancient Bugis kingdom, La Sattumpugi. To Ugi basically means 'the followers of La Sattumpugi'.

Little is known about the early history of this language due to the lack of written records. The earliest written record of this language is Sureq Galigo, the epic creation myth of the Bugis people.

Another written source of Buginese is Lontara, a term which refers to the traditional script and historical record as well. The earliest historical record of Lontara dates to around the 17th century. Lontara records have been described by historians of Indonesia as "sober" and "factual" when compared to their counterparts from other regions of Maritime Southeast Asia, such as the babad of Java. These records are usually written in a matter-of-fact tone with very few mythical elements, and the writers would usually put disclaimers before stating something that they cannot verify.

Prior to the Dutch arrival in the 19th century, a missionary, B. F. Matthews, translated the Bible into Buginese, which made him the first European to acquire knowledge of the language. He was also one of the first Europeans to master Makassarese. The dictionaries and grammar books compiled by him, and the literature and folklore texts he published, remain basic sources of information about both languages.

Upon colonization by the Dutch, a number of Bugis fled from their home area of South Sulawesi seeking a better life. This led to the existence of small groups of Buginese speakers throughout Maritime Southeast Asia.

== Classification ==
Buginese belongs to the South Sulawesi subgroup of the Austronesian language family. Within the South Sulawesi subgroup, it is most closely related to Campalagian and the Tamanic outlier in West Kalimantan.

== Geographical distribution ==
Most of the native speakers (around 3 million) are concentrated in South Sulawesi, Indonesia but there are small groups of Buginese speakers on the island of Java, Samarinda and east Sumatra of Indonesia, east Sabah and Malay Peninsula, Malaysia and South Philippines. This Bugis diaspora is the result of migration since the 17th century that was mainly driven by continuous warfare situations. (Dutch direct colonization started in the early 20th century.)

== Phonology ==
Buginese has six vowels: /a/, /e/, /i/, /o/, /u/, and the central vowel /ə/.

The following table gives the consonant phonemes of Buginese together with their representation in Lontara script.

Consonants
		Labial		Dental		Palatal		Velar		Glottal	
Nasal		[m]	ᨆ	[n]	ᨊ	[ɲ]	ᨎ	[ŋ]	ᨂ		
Prenasalized cluster		[mp]	ᨇ	[nr]	ᨋ	[ɲc]	ᨏ	[ŋk]	ᨃ		
Plosive	voiced	[b]	ᨅ	[d]	ᨉ	[ɟ]	ᨍ	[ɡ]	ᨁ		
Plosive	voiceless	[p]	ᨄ	[t]	ᨈ	[c]	ᨌ	[k]	ᨀ	[ʔ]	(Note: /ʔ/ only occurs finally, and is therefore not written in Lontara.)
Fricative				[s]	ᨔ					[h]	ᨖ
Rhotic				[r]	ᨑ						
Approximant		[w]	ᨓ	[l]	ᨒ	[j]	ᨐ				

When Buginese is written in Latin script, general Indonesian spelling conventions are applied: [ɲ] is represented by ⟨ny⟩, [ŋ] by ⟨ng⟩, [ɟ] by ⟨j⟩, [j] by ⟨y⟩. The glottal stop [ʔ] is usually represented by an apostrophe (e.g. ana' [anaʔ] 'child'), but occasionally ⟨q⟩ is also used. /e/ and /ə/ are usually uniformly spelled as ⟨e⟩, but /e/ is often written as ⟨é⟩ to avoid ambiguity.

== Grammar ==
=== Pronouns ===
Buginese has four sets of personal pronouns, one free set, and three bound sets:

		independent	enclitic	prefixed	suffixed
1st person	singular	iaq	-aq/-kaq/-waq	(k)u-	-(k)kuq
1st person	plural	idiq	-iq/-kiq	ta-	-(t)taq
2nd person	polite	idiq	-iq/-kiq	ta-	-(t)taq
2nd person	familiar	iko	-o/-ko	mu-	-(m)mu
3rd person		ia	-i/-wi	na-	-(n)na
1st person plural excl. (archaic)		ikəŋ	-kkəŋ	ki-	-mməŋ

The enclitic set is used with subjects of intransitive verbs, and objects of transitive verbs. The proclitic set is with subjects of transitive verbs. The suffixed set is primarily used in possessive function.

=== Aspects ===
The following are grammatical aspects of the language:

Durative	Perfective	Conditional	Doubt	Emphasis	Place
kaq	naq	paq	gaq	si	é
kiq/ko	niq/no	piq/po	giq/go	sa	tu
kiq	niq	piq	giq	to	ro
i	ni	pi	gi	mi	
	na	pa	ga		

==== Examples ====
ᨄᨘᨑᨊᨚ ᨆᨙᨋ?
pura-no manre
{have [portmanteau of perfective na (ᨊ) + you]} eat
'Have you already eaten?'

ᨉᨙᨄ
deq-pa
{not + [conditional (ᨄ)]}
'Not yet.'

⟨q⟩ represents the glottal stop. It is not written in the Lontara script.

Example of usage:

{ᨆᨙᨒᨚ ᨀ} ᨌᨛᨆᨙ
méloq-kaq cemmé
want-I bathe
I want to take a bath

== Writing system ==
Buginese was traditionally written using the Lontara script, of the Brahmic family, which is also used for the Makassar language and the Mandar language. The name Lontara derives from the Malay word for the palmyra palm, lontar, the leaves of which are the traditional material for manuscripts in India, South East Asia and Indonesia. Today, however, it is often written using the Latin script.

=== Buginese lontara ===
The Buginese lontara (locally known as Aksara Ugi) has a slightly different pronunciation from the other lontaras like the Makassarese. Like other Indic scripts, it also utilizes diacritics to distinguish the vowels [i], [u], [e], [o] and [ə] from the default inherent vowel /a/ (actually pronounced [ɔ]) implicitly represented in all base consonant letters (including the zero-consonant a).

But unlike most other Brahmic scripts of India, the Buginese script traditionally does not have any virama sign (or alternate half-form for vowel-less consonants, or subjoined form for non-initial consonants in clusters) to suppress the inherent vowel, so it is normally impossible to write consonant clusters (a few ones were added later, derived from ligatures, to mark the prenasalization), geminated consonants or final consonants.

== Dialects and sub-dialects ==
The Bugis still distinguish themselves according to their major precolony states (Bone, Wajo, Soppeng, and Sidenreng) or groups of petty states (around Pare-Pare, Sinjai, and Suppa). The languages of these areas, with their relatively minor differences from one another, have been largely recognized by linguists as constituting dialects: recent linguistic research has identified eleven of them, most comprising two or more sub-dialects.

The following Buginese dialects are listed in the Ethnologue: Bone (Palakka, Dua Boccoe, Mare), Pangkep (Pangkajane), Camba, Sidrap (Sidenreng, North Pinrang, Alitta), Pasangkayu (Ugi Riawa), Sinjai (Enna, Palattae, Bulukumba), Soppeng (Kessi), Wajo, Barru (Pare-Pare, Nepo, Soppeng Riaja, Tompo, Tanete), Sawitto (Pinrang), Luwu (Luwu, Bua Ponrang, Wara, Malangke-Ussu).

== Numbers ==
The numbers are:

1	ᨔᨙᨉᨗ	seddi
2	ᨉᨘᨓ	dua
3	ᨈᨛᨒᨘ	təllu
4	ᨕᨛᨄ	əppa'
5	ᨒᨗᨆ	lima
6	ᨕᨛᨊᨛ	ənnəŋ
7	ᨄᨗᨈᨘ	pitu
8	ᨕᨑᨘᨓ	aruá
9	ᨕᨙᨔᨑ	aserá
10	ᨔᨄᨘᨒᨚ	səppulo
20	ᨉᨘᨓᨄᨘᨒᨚ	duappulo
30	ᨈᨛᨒᨘᨄᨘᨒᨚ	təlluppulo
40	ᨄᨈᨄᨘᨒᨚ	patappulo
50	ᨒᨗᨆᨄᨘᨒᨚ	limappulo
60	ᨕᨛᨊᨛᨄᨘᨒᨚᨊ	ənnəppulona
70	ᨄᨗᨈᨘᨄᨘᨒᨚ	pituppulo
80	ᨕᨑᨘᨓᨄᨘᨒᨚᨊ	aruá pulona
90	ᨕᨙᨔᨑᨄᨘᨒᨚᨊ	aserá pulona
100	ᨔᨗᨑᨈᨘ	siratu'
1000	ᨔᨗᨔᨛᨅᨘ	sisəbbu
10,000	ᨔᨗᨒᨔ	silassa
100,000	ᨔᨗᨀᨛᨈᨗ	sikətti

=== Sample text ===
The Universal Declaration of Human Rights (Article 1) in the Buginese language (written in Lontara alphabet):

ᨔᨗᨊᨗᨊ ᨑᨘᨄ ᨈᨕᨘ ᨑᨗ ᨍᨍᨗᨕᨊᨁᨗ ᨑᨗᨒᨗᨊᨚᨕᨙ ᨊᨄᨘᨊᨕᨗ ᨆᨊᨙᨊᨁᨗ ᨑᨗᨕᨔᨙᨊᨁᨙ ᨕᨒᨙᨅᨗᨑᨙ᨞ ᨊᨄᨘᨊᨕᨗ ᨑᨗᨕᨔᨙᨊᨁᨙ ᨕᨀᨒᨙ᨞ ᨊᨄᨘᨊᨕᨗ ᨑᨗᨕᨔᨙᨊᨁᨙ ᨕᨈᨗ ᨆᨑᨙᨊᨗ ᨊ ᨔᨗᨅᨚᨒᨙ ᨅᨚᨒᨙᨊ ᨄᨉ ᨔᨗᨄᨀᨈᨕᨘ ᨄᨉ ᨆᨔᨒᨔᨘᨑᨙ᨞

Transliteration:

Sininna rupa tau ri jajiangngi rilinoe nappunnai manengngi riasengnge alebbireng. Nappunai riasengnge akkaleng, nappunai riasengnge ati marennni na sibole bolena pada sipakatau pada massalasureng.

== Trivia ==
- A Buginese poem is painted on a wall near the Royal Netherlands Institute of Southeast Asian and Caribbean Studies in Leiden, Netherlands, as one of the wall poems in Leiden.

== See also ==
- Bugis of Sabah
- Bugis
- Pallawa
