= North Putussibau =

- District
- Country: Indonesia
- Province: West Kalimantan
- Regency: Kapuas Hulu

North Putussibau (Indonesian: Putussibau Utara) is a district (kecamatan) located in Kapuas Hulu Regency, West Kalimantan, Indonesia.

== Geography ==
North Putussibau is located in the northern part of Kapuas Hulu Regency and borders Malaysia to the north. North Putussibau is characterized by its tropical rainforest climate, typical of the Borneo region. This district has a topography dominated by hills and lowlands, with rivers flowing throughout its territory, including the Kapuas River, which is the longest river in Indonesia and functions as an important transportation route.

== Environment ==
=== Betung Kerihun National Park ===
Betung Kerihun National Park (Taman Nasional Betung Kerihun; abbreviated as TNBK) is the largest conservation area in West Kalimantan Province located in Kapuas Hulu Regency. Administratively, it is included in four districts, namely North Putussibau District, South Putussibau District, Embaloh Hulu District, and Batang Lupar District. Geographically, TNBK is located between coordinates 112010' 47" BT – 1036' 35" N and 114012' 49 BT" – 0036' 26" N. The TNBK area has a total area of 816,693.40 hectares or around 27.37% of the total area of Kapuas Hulu Regency. The total border line of TNBK is 784 km long, divided into 368 km bordering Malaysia, 138 km with the East Kalimantan provincial border, and 278 km bordering protected forests (TNBK 2014). Established in 1992, the park covers an area of about 8,000 square kilometers and is part of the larger Heart of Borneo initiative, aimed at conserving the region's unique biodiversity. The park features diverse ecosystems, including lowland and montane rainforests, and is home to a variety of wildlife such as orangutans, proboscis monkeys (Bekantan), numerous bird species and endemic flora. Betung Kerihun National Park also plays an important role in protecting water resources and preventing soil erosion.

Betung Kerihun also includes the Kerihun mountain range, which adds to the park's ecological significance by providing critical watershed areas. The park is vital for local communities and indigenous groups who rely on its resources, but it faces challenges such as deforestation and habitat fragmentation due to logging and agricultural expansion. Conservation efforts are ongoing to preserve its rich biodiversity and natural landscapes.

== Demographics ==
The population of North Putussibau consists of various ethnic groups, with the majority of the population coming from the Dayak tribe. In addition, there are also other tribes such as Malay and Javanese who live in this area. The daily languages used are Dayak and Indonesian.

== Economy ==
The economy of the Putussibau Utara community generally relies on the agricultural sector, with main commodities such as rice, corn, and various vegetables. In addition to agriculture, the community is also involved in fisheries and forestry activities.

== Transportation ==
Transportation in North Putussibau is facilitated by a network of roads and river routes. The district is accessible via land and water transport, with connections to other parts of Kapuas Hulu and West Kalimantan. Infrastructure in this district is still under development. Some roads in this district are still dirt roads which are difficult to pass, especially during the rainy season. The main transportation is via river with motorboats and klotok, as well as land roads connecting this district with the government center in Putussibau, the capital of Kapuas Hulu Regency.

== Culture and tourism ==
The culture in North Putussibau is heavily influenced by the customs and traditions of the Dayak tribe. Several cultural festivals and traditional ceremonies are held periodically, attracting local and foreign tourists. Natural attractions such as tropical forests, rivers, and waterfalls are also attractions for visitors.
