= Kapuas Hulu Regency =

Regency in West Kalimantan, Indonesia

Kapuas Hulu Regency Kabupaten Kapuas Hulu
- Regency
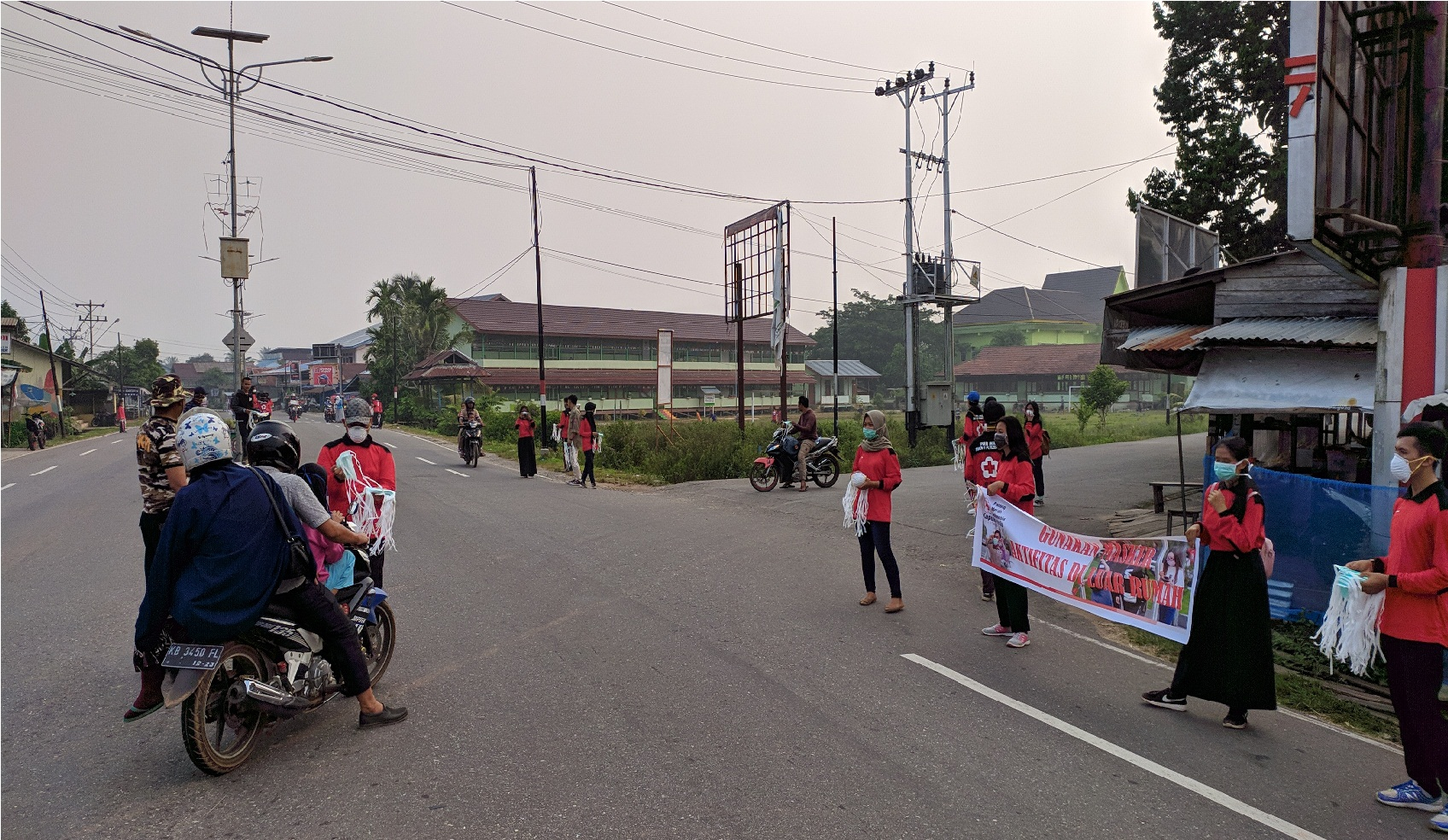
- A road section in Putussibau

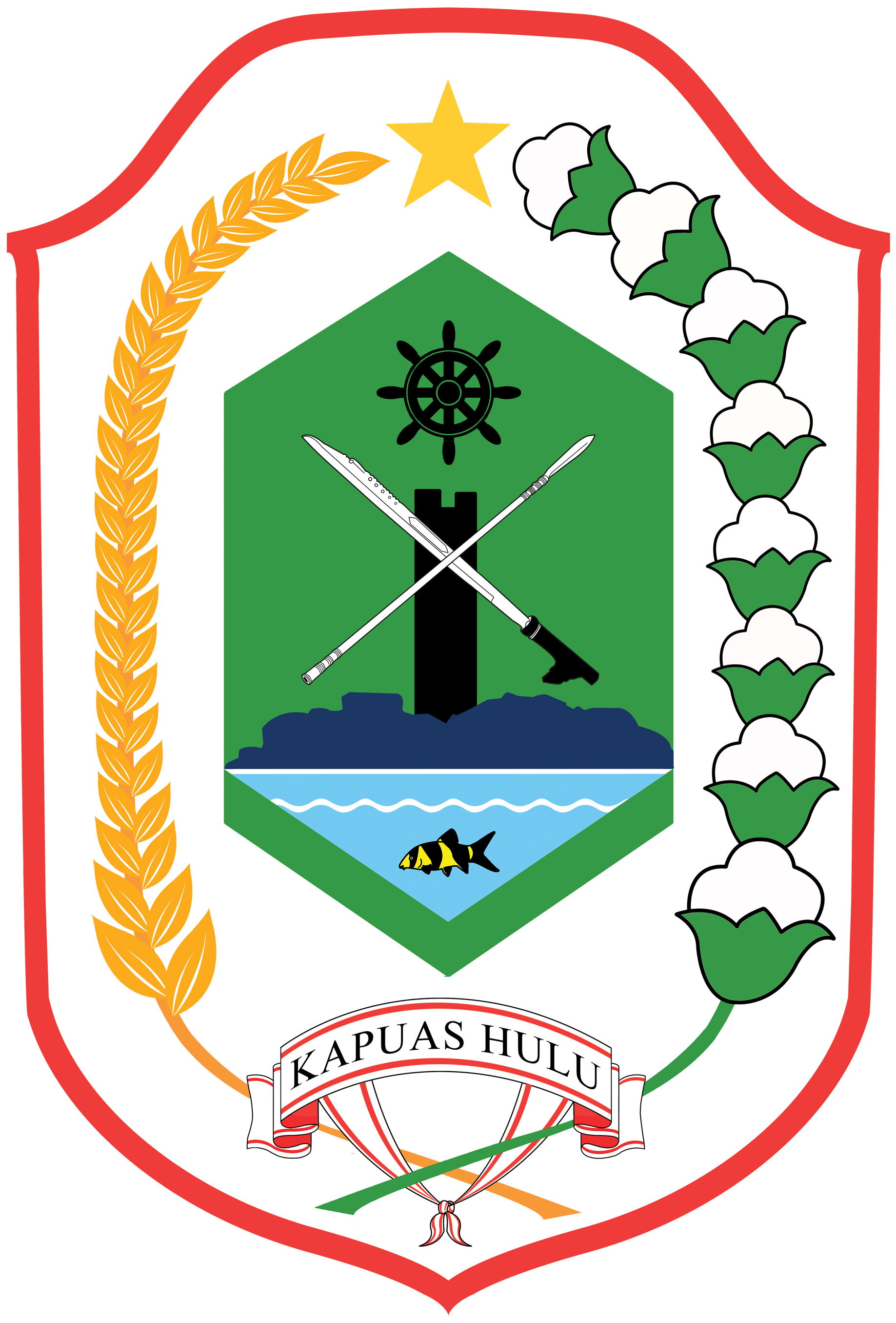
- Coat of arms

- Location within West Kalimantan

- Location in Kalimantan and Indonesia Kapuas Hulu Regency (Indonesia)
- Coordinates: 0.8167°N 112.7667°E
- Country: Indonesia
- Province: West Kalimantan
- Regency seat: Putussibau

Government
  - Regent: Fransiskus Diaan
  - Vice Regent: Sukardi

Area
  - Total: 31,318.25 km^{2} (12,092.04 sq mi)

Population (mid 2025 estimate)
  - Total: 280,198
  - Density: 8.94680/km^{2} (23.1721/sq mi)
- Time zone: UTC+7 (IWST)
- Area code: (+62) 567
- HDI (2020): ▲0.657 (Medium)
- Website: kapuashulukab.go.id

Kapuas Hulu Regency (or "Upper Kapuas" Regency) is a regency in West Kalimantan province of Indonesia in the middle of Borneo. Located around the upper drainage area of the Kapuas River, it has a total land area of 31,318.25 square kilometres or around 21.3% of West Kalimantan province's area. The regency seat is located in town of Putussibau, where most of its economic and government activities take place. Kapuas Hulu Regency is one of the few Indonesian regencies having a land border with another country (in this case, with Malaysia). It is also the largest regency in the province by land area. Due to its relatively large area, it is sparsely populated compared to neighbouring regencies around it. The regency had a population of 222,160 at the 2010 Census and 252,609 according to the 2020 Census; the official estimate as at mid 2025 was 280,198 (comprising 144,135 males and 136,063 females).

== History ==
The area was under kingdom of Selimbau, which was under influence of Sultanate of Sambas in early 17th and 18th century. Other than it, there were several smaller kingdoms and Malay chieftains such as Suhai, Jongkong, and Bunut, scattered around the region.

On 1823, Dutch settlers began exploring the region and Dutch colonial government signed a treaty with kingdom of Selimbau, acknowledging its domination over smaller kingdoms and chieftains in the region. Over time, the kingdom gradually lost its autonomy and the last king of Selimbau, Haji Gusti Usman, abdicated on 1925. The region was incorporated into Dutch East Indies and administrated from Sintang.

During Japanese occupation of Dutch East Indies, the region was administrated by Imperial Japanese Navy from Banjarmasin. Japanese opened a coal mine around Mentabah and Tebaung river in 1942 to support their war effort on Pacific. The locals welcomed Japanese at first, thought them to be liberator from Dutch rule. However, due to exploitation and treatment on locals, they turned against the Japanese later on. It was estimated around 1,000 native worked as Rōmusha died in the region during Japanese occupation. The occupation resulted in Majang Desa War or more popularly known as Dayak Desa War, with Japanese expelled from Borneo interior as the result. One of leader's war and Dayak chieftain, nicknamed Pang Suma, today is regarded as hero not only in the region but also Indonesia in general. The region became an autonomous royal region within West Kalimantan in 1946 and later became a regency under Law Number 3 of 1953.

There has been ongoing discussion about forming a new province, Kapuas Raya, which would include Kapuas Hulu Regency as part of it (together with the regencies of Sanggau, Sekadau, Sintang and Melawi), to be separated from West Kalimantan. However, due to a moratorium on new administrative division creations for financial reason since 2014, its creation has been put on halt by the Indonesian government.

== Geography ==
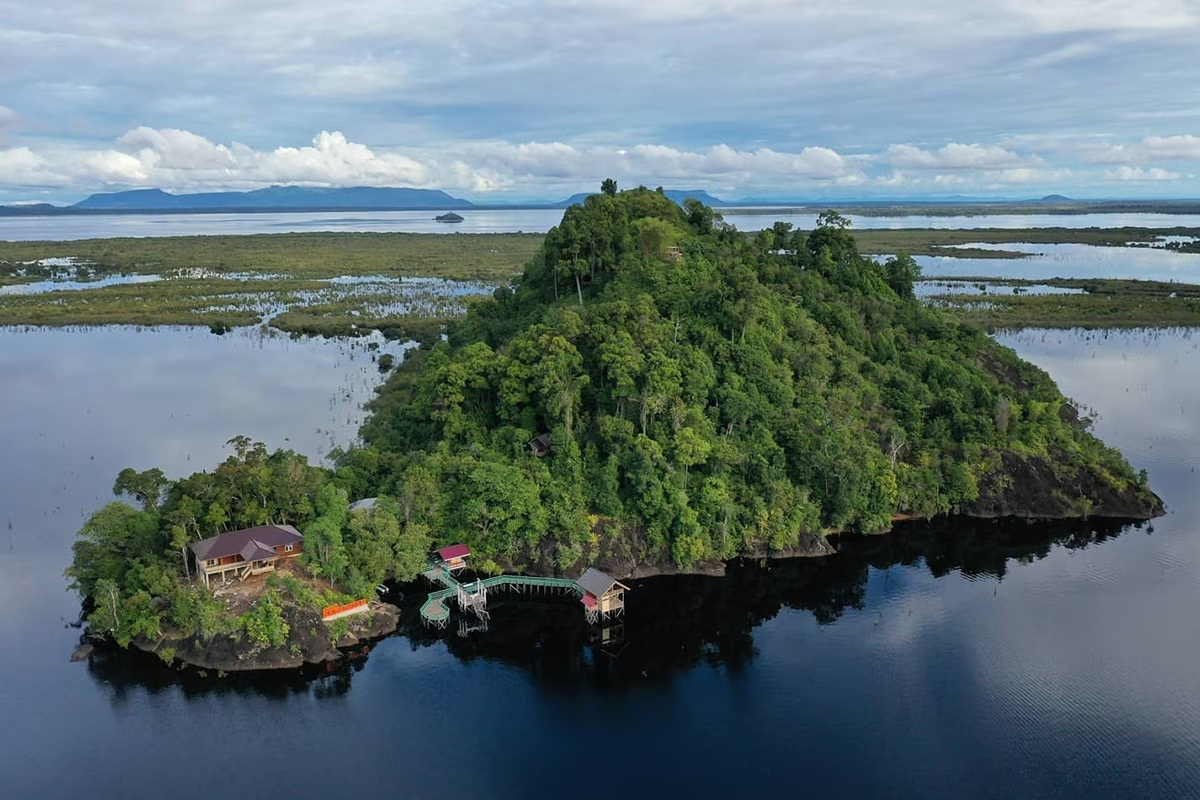
Lake Sentarum National Park

The regency borders Sarawak in the north, Sintang Regency in the west and south, and East Kalimantan as well as Central Kalimantan in the east. Soil formation in the region is considered to be one of the oldest in Indonesian archipelago. There are numerous lakes, swamps, and wetlands in the region and lower region is often submerged by water from nearby rivers as long as six months a year. Settlements are mostly located around rivers due to historical importance of inland waterways in the past. There are 925,134 hectares of national park, 834.140 hectares of protected forest, and 769,000 hectares of production forest.

The regency has tropical climate with temperature between 22.9 and 33.5 Celsius, with 84.6% air humidity, and 38% sunlight intensity. The wettest month is May with average rainfall of 547.66 mm^{3}, and the driest is August with average 222.2 mm^{3}.

One of largest lakes in Kalimantan, Danau Sentarum National Park situated to the west of Putussibau is the largest wetland conservation area in Indonesian (127,000 ha). It comprises a series of interconnected lakes with freshwater and peat swamp forest, fishing villages and a number of hills. The lake level fluctuates with the seasons. In the dry season the water can drop by 10-12 m leaving many lakes dry and other very small size. There is high diversity of plants and animals.

== Governance ==
=== Administrative districts ===
At the time of the 2010 Census, the regency was divided into 25 administrative districts (kecamatan). However this has since been reduced to 23 by the amalgamation of the former Danau Sentarum District into Selimbau District, and the amalgamation of the former Hulu Kapuas District into Putussibau Selatan District. The regency seat, Putussibau, consists of the urban parts of two districts, which are North Putussibau and South Putussibau; both form the first and second most populous districts in the regency. Due to regency seat not having clear official boundaries, the estimated population of the town could be as high as 50,000 people depending on where the speculative border is drawn; but both districts now include extensive rural regions. Below is a list of the districts with their areas and their populations according the 2010 and 2020 Censuses, as well as the official estimates as at mid 2025. The table also includes the locations of the district administrative centres, the number of administrative villages in each district (totaling 278 rural villages (desa) and 4 urban villages (kelurahan), and its post code.

| Kode Wilayah | Name of District (kecamatan) | Area in km^{2} | Pop'n 2010 Census | Pop'n 2020 Census | Pop'n mid 2025 Estimate | Admin centre | No. of villages | Post code |
|---|---|---|---|---|---|---|---|---|
| 61.06.15 | Silat Hilir | 859.89 | 16,987 | 19,791 | 22,613 | Nanga Silat | 13 | 78773 |
| 61.06.16 | Silat Hulu | 1,012.00 | 10,735 | 11,395 | 12,421 | Nanga Dangkan | 14 | 78774 |
| 61.06.08 | Hulu Gurung | 429.75 | 12,339 | 13,914 | 14,724 | Nanga Tepuai | 15 | 78764 |
| 61.06.05 | Bunut Hulu | 1,729.50 | 12,889 | 14,588 | 16,546 | Nanga Suruk | 15 | 78762 |
| 61.06.20 | Mentebah | 613.09 | 8,905 | 10,754 | 12,050 | Nanga Mentebah | 8 | 78757 |
| 61.06.02 | Bika | 405.47 | 4,228 | 4,601 | 5,186 | Bika | 8 | 78753 |
| 61.06.18 | Kalis | 2,664.72 | 11,764 | 13,578 | 14,917 | Nanga Kalis | 17 | 78756 |
| 61.06.17 | Putussibau Selatan (South Putussibau) | 6,497.72 | 18,718^{(a)} | 23,112 | 27,348 | Kedamin | 16 ^{(b)} | 78714 |
| 61.06.03 | Embaloh Hilir | 583.08 | 5,369 | 5,830 | 6,108 | Nanga Embaloh | 9 | 78754 |
| 61.06.05 | Bunut Hilir | 807.41 | 8,434 | 8,554 | 9,123 | Nanga Bunut | 11 | 78761 & 78762 |
| 61.06.19 | Boyan Tanjung | 760.06 | 10,283 | 12,573 | 14,378 | Boyan Tanjung | 16 | 78758 |
| 61.06.21 | Pengkadan | 357.37 | 7,959 | 9,454 | 10,145 | Menendang | 11 | 78759 |
| 61.06.07 | Jongkong | 490.98 | 9,907 | 10,868 | 11,925 | Jongkong | 14 | 78763 |
| 61.06.09 | Selimbau | 1,032.91 | 13,986^{(c)} | 13,844 | 14,667 | Selimbau | 17 | 78765 |
| 61.06.22 | Suhaid | 592.37 | 8,112 | 9,305 | 10,355 | Nanga Suhaid | 11 | 78775 |
| 61.06.11 | Seberuang | 533.24 | 10,314 | 11,303 | 12,111 | Sejiram | 15 | 78772 |
| 61.06.10 | Semitau | 808.48 | 7,992 | 9,206 | 10,773 | Semitau | 12 | 78771 |
| 61.06.13 | Empanang | 603.72 | 2,858 | 3,570 | 4,301 | Nanga Kantuk | 6 | 78768 |
| 61.06.23 | Puring Kencana | 267.28 | 2,214 | 2,302 | 2,509 | Sungai Antu | 6 | 78769 |
| 61.06.14 | Badau | 638.40 | 5,203 | 6,738 | 7,895 | Nanga Badau | 9 | 78767 |
| 61.06.12 | Batang Lupar | 1,413.80 | 4,552 | 5,473 | 5,774 | Lanjak | 10 | 78766 |
| 61.06.04 | Embaloh Hulu | 3,543.12 | 4,675 | 5,337 | 5,485 | Benua Martinus | 10 | 78755 |
| 61.06.01 | Putussibau Utara (North Putussibau) | 4,673.89 | 23,737 | 26,519 | 28,844 | Putussibau | 19 ^{(d)} | 78716 |
| | Totals | 31,318.25 | 222,160 | 252,609 | 280,184 | Putussibau | 282 | |

Notes: (a) including 5,880 in the former Hulu Kapuas District. (b) including two kelurahan - Kedamin Hulu (with 7,962 inhabitants in 2024) and Kedamin Hilir (with 5,230 in 2024).
(c) including 3,868 in the former Danau Sentarum District. (d) including two kelurahan - Putussibau Kota (town, with 9,174 inhabitants in 2024) and Hilir Kantor (with 3948 in 2024).

=== Local government ===
The regency is a second-level administrative division equivalent to a city. As a regency, it is headed by a regent who is elected democratically. Head of districts are appointed directly by the regent with the recommendation of the regency secretary. Executive power lies with the regent and vice regent, while legislative function is exercised by the regency's parliament.

=== Politics ===
On provincial parliament, the regency is part of 7th West Kalimantan electoral district together with Melawi Regency and Sintang Regency which together sends 11 out of 65 representatives. On regency level, it is divided into four electoral districts that in total has 30 representatives. The last election was in 2019 and the next one is in 2024.

| Electoral district | Region | Representatives |
|---|---|---|
| 1st Kapuas Hulu | Badau, Batang Lupar, Embaloh Hilir, Embaloh Hulu, Empanang, Puring Kencana, and North Putussibau District | 7 |
| 2nd Kapuas Hulu | Bika, Bunut Hulu, Kalis, Mentebah, and South Putussibau District | 8 |
| 3rd Kapuas Hulu | Boyan Tanjung, Bunut Hilir, Hulu Gurung, Jongkong, Pengkadan, and Selimau District | 8 |
| 4th Kapuas Hulu | Seberuang, Semitau, Silat Hilir, Silat Hulu, and Suhaid District | 7 |
| Total | | 30 |

== Economy ==
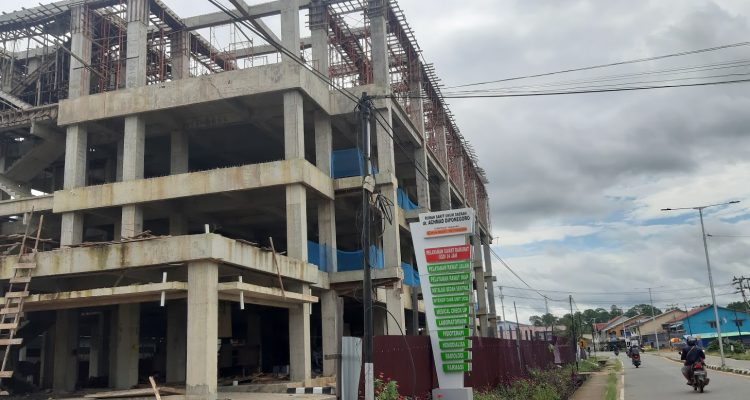
A construction activity in Putussibau. Construction is the second largest sector in the regency.

Agriculture and construction are the biggest sector in the regency as of 2020. Agriculture consisted of 23% of the regency's gross regional product, while construction consisted of 22.42%. Manufacture industry is the third largest sector, with account of 11.28% of the regency's gross regional product. The most rapid growth is found on information and communication sector with figure of 7.02% as of 2020, while general service sector declined as many as 17.93% in the same year. Agriculture employed 62.61% of the regency's workforce, followed by service sector with 22.14% and manufacture with 15.25%.

The regency produced total around 680 tons of various vegetables such as cucumber and water spinach. Other than that, there were total 174,195 tons of fruit production in the regency due to significance of fruit plantation in regency's agriculture sector. The regency also produced 375 tons of rubber and 5 tons of coffee bean in the same year. Significant livestock includes chicken, with total meat production of 1,305 tons on 2020. In addition, there are 132,064 pigs, 3,991 goats, and 161,777 cows. Despite being landlocked, the regency also has significant fish catch, mostly from aquaculture and freshwater catches. Significant species from the regency included Nile tilapia with 7,073 tons, Clarias with 3,760 tons, Channa micropeltes with 17,007 tons, and Pangasius with 4,236 tons. There are noted 5,297 fish ponds used for aquaculture in the regency with total area of 8,258 hectares and 7,930 keramba with total area of 15,860 hectares. The actual figure is possibly higher due to informal nature of Indonesian economy. Tourism is a growing sector in the regency, especially ecotourism. There are 60 hotels in the regency as of 2020, and the regency was visited by 2,339 international tourists as well as 6,805 domestic tourists. In total there are 116 registered restaurants in the regency.

Unemployment rate on 2020 was 4.02% and poverty rate was 8.99%.

== Demographics ==
As with most places in Indonesia, the population is generally young and consist of reproductive age workforce. From the population, as of 2022 there are 146,654 people considered as part of workforce above age 15. Two most populous districts, North and South Putussibau, contain just over 20% of the regency's population in 2024; these include the regency's largest towns in their urban (densely-populated) core, but also wide and sparsely populated rural areas. Population growth was 9.75% since 2020, with sex ratio of 105.9, meaning there are around 105.9 men per 100 women population. Dominant religion in the regency is Islam, with figure 153,486 Muslims as of 2022, followed by 83,979 Catholics, 21,880 Protestants, 330 Confucians, 291 Buddhists, 25 Hindus, and two people identified as folk religion followers.

== Infrastructure ==
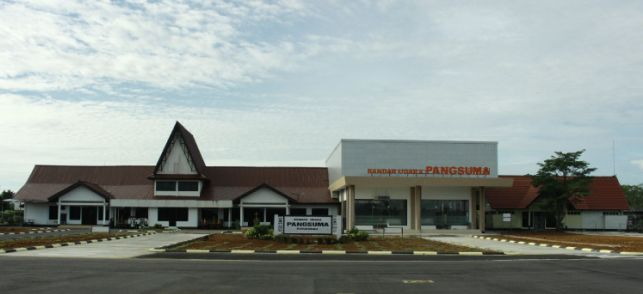
Pangsuma Airport

There are a total of 33 kindergartens, 417 elementary schools, 118 junior high schools, 37 senior high schools, and 6 vocational high schools, in addition to two higher education institutions as of 2020. One of the higher education institutions is Tarbiyah College, which is a private college focused on Islamic studies. The other higher education institution is a branch of Pontianak State Polytechnic. It is state-owned and the main campus is located in city of Pontianak with a smaller branch for Kapuas Hulu located in North Putussibau District. On healthcare sector, there are three hospitals, 132 puskesmas, and 183 village healthcare centers in the regency as of 2020. One of the main hospital, Dr. Achmad Diponegoro General Hospital, or sometimes referred as Putussibau General Hospital, is a public hospital owned by the regency government. It is classified as C-class hospital by Ministry of Health. On 2020, the hospital received building rehabilitation and expansion with new buildings. Another hospital, Pratama Semitau Hospital, is a private hospital and relatively new, inaugurated on 2019 and classified as D-class hospital. Badau Bergerak Hospital, located in Badau District, is the only hospital located outside of Putussibau and also owned by regency government as public hospital. In addition of that, there are total 28 family planning clinics.

There are exactly 505 mosques, 490 churches, and four Chinese Buddhist temple in the regency as of 2019. Total roads in the regency as of 2020 was 1,108.33 kilometres, out of which 217.34 kilometres have been paved with asphalt. The regency is served by Pangsuma Airport, which is located in Putussibau and has regular flights to Pontianak and Sintang. There's also a regular bus route from Pontianak to Putussibau, managed by Perum DAMRI. In Putussibau, usage of online ride-hailing app service is also present.
