= South Sulawesi =

Province in Sulawesi, Indonesia

South Sulawesi Sulawesi Selatan
- Province
- Province of South Sulawesi; Provinsi Sulawesi Selatan
- Coat of arms
- Motto: Toddopuli ᨈᨚᨉᨚᨄᨘᨒᨗ (Bugis-Makassar) "Keep the faith"
- South Sulawesi in Indonesia
- Interactive map of South Sulawesi
- Coordinates: 3°45′S 120°00′E
- Country: Indonesia
- Region: Sulawesi (Eastern Indonesia)
- Founded: 13 December 1960
- Capital and largest city: Makassar

Government
  - Body: South Sulawesi Provincial Government
  - Governor: Andi Sudirman Sulaiman (Gerindra)
  - Vice Governor: Fatmawati Rusdi
  - Legislature: South Sulawesi Regional House of Representatives (DPRD)

Area
  - Total: 45,323.98 km^{2} (17,499.69 sq mi)
  - Rank: 16th
- Highest elevation (Mount Latimojong): 3,478 m (11,411 ft)

Population (mid 2025 Estimate)
  - Total: 9,563,130
  - Density: 210.995/km^{2} (546.474/sq mi)

Demographics
  - Ethnic groups: 45.12% Buginese; 29.68% Makassarese; 7.34% Torajan; 17.86% others
  - Religion: 89.78% Islam; 9.19% Christianity; 7.64% Protestantism; 1.55% Catholicism; 0.73% Hinduism; 0.25% Buddhism; 0.06% Confucianism and other
  - Languages: Indonesian (official); Makassar Malay (lingua franca); Buginese, Makassarese, Toraja, Mandar, Luwu, Coastal Konjo, Selayar, Duri, Highland Konjo, Maiwa, Rampi, Wotu, Seko, Bentong, Pattinjo and other (regional)
- Time zone: UTC+08 (Indonesia Central Time)
- ISO 3166 code: ID-SN
- GDP (nominal): 2022
- Total: Rp 605.2 trillion (9th); US$ 40.8 billion Int$ 124.3 billion (PPP)
- Per capita: Rp 65.6 million (12th); US$ 4,417; Int$ 13,784 (PPP)
- Growth: ▲5.09%
- HDI (2024): ▲0.752 (14th) – high
- Website: sulselprov.go.id

South Sulawesi (Indonesian: Sulawesi Selatan; Lontara: ᨔᨘᨒᨓᨙᨔᨗ ᨔᨛᨒᨈ) is a province in the southern peninsula of Sulawesi, Indonesia. The Selayar Islands archipelago to the south of Sulawesi is also part of the province. The province is bordered by Central Sulawesi and West Sulawesi to the north, the Gulf of Bone and Southeast Sulawesi to the east, Makassar Strait to the west, and Flores Sea to the south.

The 2010 census estimated the population as 8,032,551, which makes South Sulawesi the most populous province on the island (46% of the population of Sulawesi is in South Sulawesi), and the sixth most populous province in Indonesia. At the 2020 Census, this had risen to 9,073,509, and the official estimate as of mid-2025 was 9,563,130 (comprising 4,751,880 males and 4,811,250 females). This population is increasing by almost 100,000 persons per year.

The capital and largest city is Makassar, which had nearly 1.5m inhabitants in 2025, while the Makassar metropolitan area had more than twice that population. Other large urban areas were Palopo (with 198,530 people), Parepare (with 163,400 people) and Watampone (with about 156,000 people), although the last-named is not administered as a city but comprises three separately-administered districts within Bone Regency.

The main ethnic groups in South Sulawesi are the Buginese, Makassarese and Torajan. The economy of the province is based on agriculture, fishing, and the mining of gold, magnesium, iron, and other metals. The pinisi, a traditional Indonesian two-masted sailing ship, is still used widely by the Buginese and Makassarese, mostly for inter-insular transportation, cargo, and fishing purposes within the Indonesian archipelago.

During the golden era of the spice trade, from the 15th to 19th centuries, South Sulawesi served as the gateway to the Maluku Islands. There were several small kingdoms, including two prominent ones, the kingdom of Makassar and the Bugis kingdom Bone. The Dutch East India Company (VOC) began operating in the region in the 17th century. VOC later allied with the Bugis prince, Arung Palakka, and they defeated the kingdom of Makassar. The king of Makassar, Sultan Hasanuddin was forced to sign a treaty that greatly reduced the power of Bungaya Gowa.

== History ==
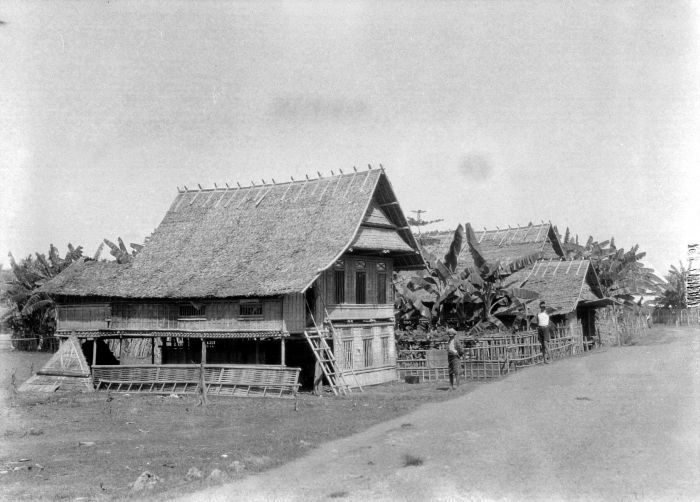
A village in South Sulawesi 1929

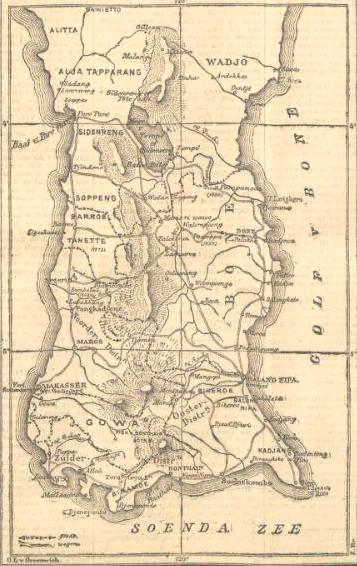
Celebes Map 1905

Sulawesi was first inhabited by humans approximately 30,000 years ago. The archaeological remains of the earliest inhabitants were discovered in caves near limestone hills around Maros, about 30 km northeast of Makassar. Pebble and flake stone tools have been collected from the river terraces in the valley of Walanae, among Soppeng and Sengkang, including the bones from giant pig and elephant species that are now extinct. Handprint paintings, estimated to be around 35,000 to 40,000 years old, have been found in the Pettakere cave, located 12 kilometres (7.5 mi) from the town of Maros and 30 kilometres (19 mi) from Makassar.

The increase in commerce due to the rise of external demand for South Sulawesi rice encouraged major agricultural expansion and political centralization in the early 14th century. Swidden agriculture was increasingly replaced with intensive wet rice cultivation, leading to a rise in population density. New settlements were founded in the interior part of the peninsula as pristine forests were cleared. These changes accompanied the rise of new interior agricultural policies, such as the Bugis chiefdoms of Boné and Wajoq, as well as the Makassar polity of Gowa.

By the early 16th century, Boné had assumed a paramount position in the eastern part of the peninsula, while the Makassar twin kingdoms of Gowa and Talloq started to expand their influence throughout the western part. Their competition for hegemony over South Sulawesi caused Gowa-Talloq and Boné to clash in the 1560s.

In 1582, Boné, Soppéng, and Wajoq signed a mutual defense pact known as the Treaty of Timurung. The alliance also referred to as the Tellumpocco ("Three Powers", lit. "Three Peaks"), sought to stop Gowa's expansionism and to reclaim the autonomy of the Bugis polities under Gowa's vassalage. Gowa's campaigns against the alliance in 1582, 1585, and 1588 were all successfully repulsed, with another one in 1590 abandoned following the death of Gowa's ruler. By the early 17th century, however, Gowa and Talloq had become the dominant powers in South Sulawesi as they supported international commerce and embraced Islam. Gowa waged successful campaigns against the Bugis kingdoms, defeating Soppéng in 1609, Wajoq in 1610, and Boné in 1611.

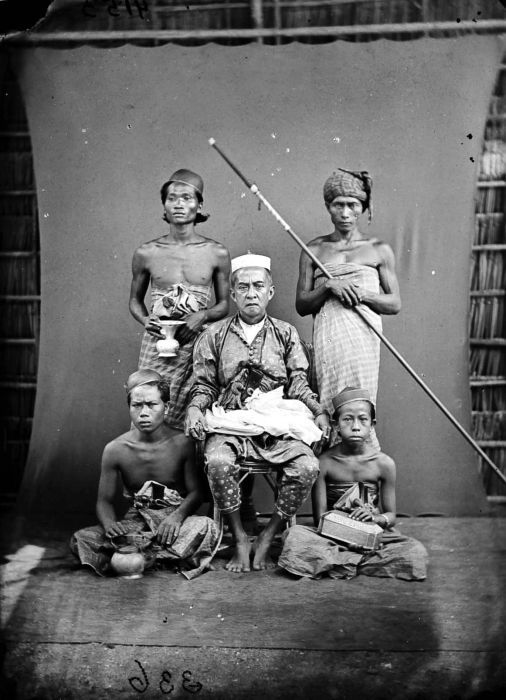
Regent of Maros, Makassar, Sulawesi

The Dutch East India Company (VOC) began operating in the region in the 17th century and saw the Kingdom of Gowa as an obstacle to its desire to control the spice trade in this area. VOC later allied with the Bugis prince, Arung Palakka, who was living in exile after the fall of the Bugis. After a year-long battle, they defeated the kingdom of Gowa. And the king of Gowa, Sultan Hasanuddin was forced to sign a treaty greatly reducing the power of Bungaya Gowa. Furthermore, Palakka became ruler in South Sulawesi.

A Bugis queen later emerged to lead the resistance against the Dutch, who were busy dealing with the Napoleonic Wars in Europe, but after the end of the Napoleonic Wars, the Dutch returned to South Sulawesi and eradicated the queen's rebellion. However resistance of the Bugis people against colonial rule continued until 1905. In 1905, the Dutch also managed to conquer Tana Toraja.

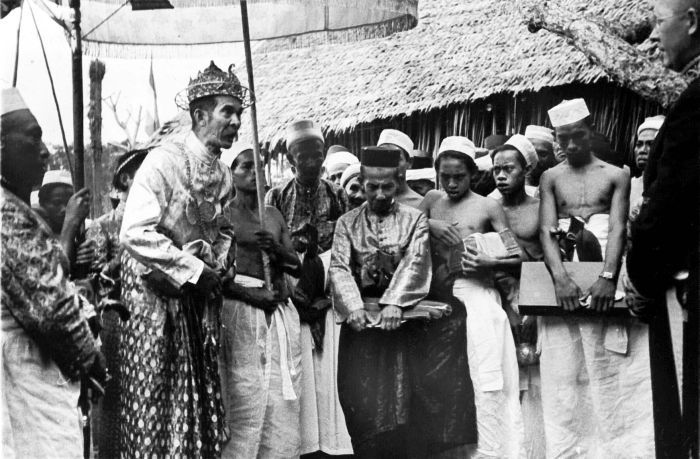
I Mangngimangngi Karaeng Bontonompo, king of Gowa, with the public and some dignitaries during the installation of acting governor of Celebes and dependencies, Mr. Bosselaar, 1937

Before the proclamation of the Republic of Indonesia, South Sulawesi consisted of several independent kingdoms territory and was inhabited by four ethnic groups namely the Buginese, Makassarese, Mandarese, and Torajan.

On June 16, 2022, a tornado struck the province, damaging 63 homes. One man died of a stress-induced medical issue during the tornado, but was not a direct tornado-related fatality.

== Geography ==
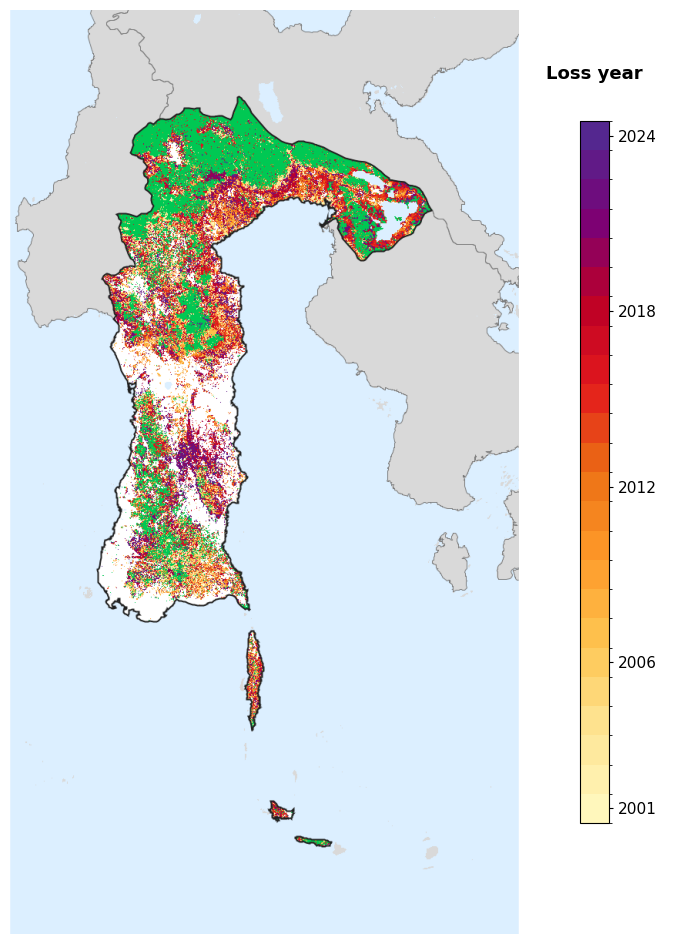
Tree-cover loss year in South Sulawesi, 2001-2024, from the Global Forest Change dataset.

South Sulawesi is located at 4°20'S 120°15'E and covers a land area of 45,323.98 square kilometres. The province is bordered by Central Sulawesi and West Sulawesi to the north, the Gulf of Bone and Southeast Sulawesi to the east, Makassar Strait to the west, and Flores Sea to the south. The province includes 369 offshore islands, including 133 in Pangkajene and Islands Regency, 123 in Selayar Islands Regency, 20 in East Luwu Regency, 16 in North Luwu Regency, 13 in Takalar Regency, 13 in Makassar City, 10 in Barru Regency, 10 in Sinjai Regency, 9 in Pinrang Regency, 8 in Bulukumba Regency, 5 in Bone Regency, 4 in Gowa Regency, 3 in Palopo City, and 1 each in Jeneponto Regency and Wajo Regency.

== Government and administrative divisions ==
Five years after independence, the government issued Law No. 21 of 1950, which became the basis of the legal establishment of what was then the Sulawesi province. Ten years later, the government passed Law No. 47 of 1960 which endorsed the formation of the South/Southeast Sulawesi province. Four years after that, with Act No. 13 of 1964, the provinces of South Sulawesi and Southeast Sulawesi were separated. Forty years later, the South Sulawesi government was split into two, with the regencies of Majene, Mamasa, Mamuju, Pasangkayu, and Polewali Mandar being separated off into a new West Sulawesi province on 5 October 2004 under Act No. 26 of 2004.

The remaining South Sulawesi Province is divided into 21 regencies and three independent cities.

The province comprises three of Indonesia's 84 national electoral districts to elect members to the People's Representative Council. The South Sulawesi I Electoral District consists of 5 regencies (Bantaeng, Jeneponto, Takalar, Gowa, and Selayar Islands), together with the city of Makassar, and elects 8 members to the People's Representative Council. The South Sulawesi II Electoral District consists of 8 regencies (Bulukumba, Sinjai, Maros, Pangkajene and Islands, Barru, Bone, Soppeng, and Wajo), together with the city of Parepare, and elects 9 members to the People's Representative Council. The South Sulawesi III Electoral District consists of 8 regencies (Sidenrang Rappang, Pinrang, Enrekang, Luwu, Tana Toraja, North Toraja, North Luwu, and East Luwu), together with the city of Palopo, and elects 7 members to the People's Representative Council.

== Demographics ==
=== Ethnic groups ===
Ethnicities of South Sulawesi - 2010 Census
1. Buginese (45.1%)
2. Makassarese (29.7%)
3. Toraja (7.34%)
4. Others (17.9%)

Historical population
Year	Pop.	±%
1971	5,180,576	—
1980	6,062,212	+17.0%
1990	6,981,646	+15.2%
1995	7,558,368	+8.3%
2000	7,159,170	−5.3%
2010	8,034,776	+12.2%
2020	9,073,509	+12.9%
2025	9,563,130	+5.4%
Source: Badan Pusat Statistik 2011, 2021 to 2026. The reduction between 1995 and 2000 is due to the separation of West Sulawesi from South Sulawesi.

Religion in South Sulawesi (2022)
1. Islam (89.9%)
2. Protestantism (7.41%)
3. Roman Catholic (1.62%)
4. Hinduism (0.68%)
5. Buddhism (0.22%)
6. Confucianism (0.00%)

South Sulawesi has a diverse range of ethnic groups. The main three are:

- The Buginese (To Ugi) are the largest ethnic group in South Sulawesi, comprising almost 4 million people. These people inhabit the middle of the southern peninsula of South Sulawesi. Many of these people have migrated to the outer islands around Sulawesi, even as far as Malaysia.
- The Makassarese (Tu-Mangkasaraʼ) are the second largest ethnic group in South Sulawesi. Their language is Makassar. Makassar people inhabit the southern part of the southern peninsula of South Sulawesi including the Jeneponto, Takalar, Bulukumba, Bantaeng, Gowa, Maros, Pangkajene and Islands, Selayar Islands (the Selayar people are sometimes considered a sub-ethnic group of Makassar people), and Makassar city. The total population is over 2 million people.
- The Torajan (To Raja) are the indigenous ethnic group that inhabits the mountainous northern region of the province, comprising Tana Toraja ("Land of Toraja") and North Toraja Regencies.

=== Language ===
There are various languages and dialects spoken in South Sulawesi. The majority of them belong to the Malayo-Polynesian branch of Austronesian languages. Below is the list of major languages spoken in the province.

- Makassarese is spoken in the southwestern part of the province, including the city of Makassar. It has a total of 2.1 million speakers.
- Buginese is spoken in an area stretching from Pinrang in the northwest to Bulukumba in the southeast. This language is the predominant language used by many communities in South Sulawesi. It is natively spoken by around 5 million people as a first language, plus 500,000 as second language speakers, making it one of the most widely spoken languages in both South Sulawesi and the island of Sulawesi.
- The Tae' language is mostly spoken in Greater Luwu, the region in the northeast of the province comprising the regencies of Luwu, North Luwu, and the western part of East Luwu, together with the city of Palopo. It had approximately 400,000 native speakers in 2020.
- The Toraja language is the native language of Tana Toraja, comprising Tana Toraja Regency and Toraja Utara Regency. It has a total of over 800,000 speakers.
- Mandar, Mamuju, and Pattae' are the languages spoken by the Mandar people in the province of West Sulawesi, especially in Mamuju, Polewali Mandar, Majene, and Pasangkayu Regencies. In addition to the core in the tribal areas, they are also scattered in coastal parts of South Sulawesi. It is spoken by around 400,000 people.
- The Duri language is a language spoken in the north of Mount Bambapuang, Enrekang, and into the border of Tana Toraja. There are an estimated around 130,000 native speakers. It is the prestige variety of the Massenrempulu languages.
- The Konjo language is divided into two groups: the Coastal Konjo language and the Highland Konjo language. The Coastal Konjo live in coastal areas, notably the Bulukumba area, in the southeastern corner of the southern part of the island of Sulawesi. The Mountain Konjo lives in the mountains of southeastern Sulawesi, around Bawakaraeng. It has a total of almost 300,000 native speakers.

In 2010 there were 3,921,543 males and 4,111,008 females with 1,848,132 housing units, with an average of 4.34 people per unit versus the national average of 3.86. Some 13.3 percent of the population was under the national poverty line.

- The Human Development Index (HDI) for South Sulawesi in 2008 reached 70.22.
- Life expectancy was 69.60 in 2008.
- The poor population was at 12.31 percent in 2009, amounting to 963.6 thousand persons.
- There was an unemployment rate of 8.90 percent in 2009, amounting to 296,559 people.

=== Religion ===
The main religion in South Sulawesi is Islam at 89.62%. Other major religions include Cristianity 9.03% (124,255), Buddhism 0.24%, and Hinduism 0.72%.

== Economy ==
South Sulawesi GDP share by sector (2022)
1. Agriculture (22.1%)
2. Manufacturing (12.9%)
3. Other Industrial (19.3%)
4. Service (45.7%)

The Sulawesi economy grew by 7.78 percent in 2008 and grew by 6.20 percent in 2009. Economic Growth in the First Quarter of 2010 reached 7.77 percent. The GDP in 2009 (ADHK) amounted to Rp 47.31 trillion and 99.90 Trillion (ADHB).

=== Agriculture ===
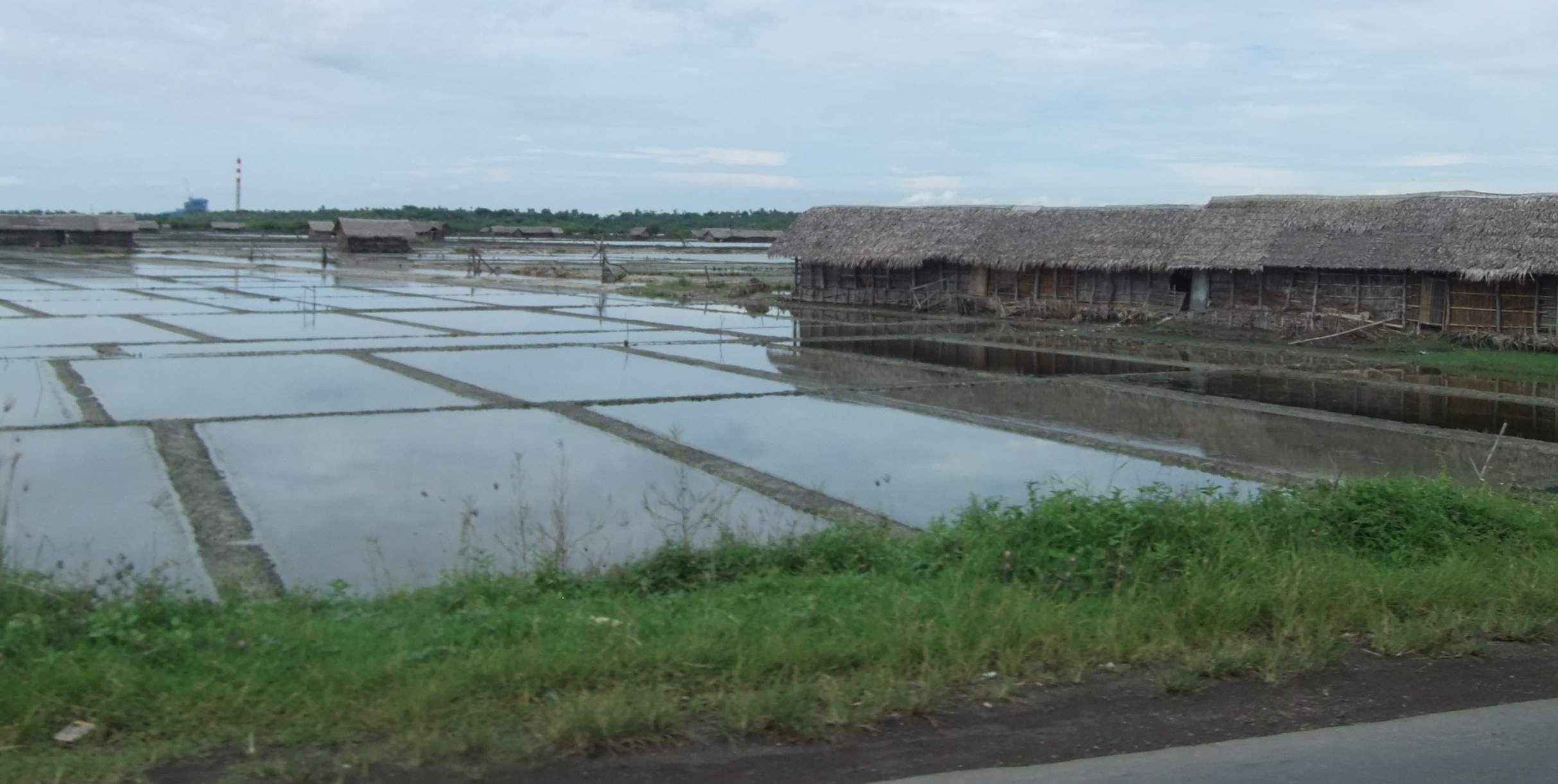
Salt evaporation ponds in Jeneponto Regency, South Sulawesi

As one of the national rice granaries, South Sulawesi annually produces 2,305,469 tons of rice. Of that amount, rice designated for local consumption is around 884,375 tons and 1,421,094 tons of reserves remain for distribution to other eastern areas. Rice is even exported to Malaysia, to the Philippines, and Papua New Guinea. The locations of the largest rice production are in the Bone regency, in Soppeng, in Wajo, in Sidrap, in Pinrang, and Luwu (Bodowasipilu Area).

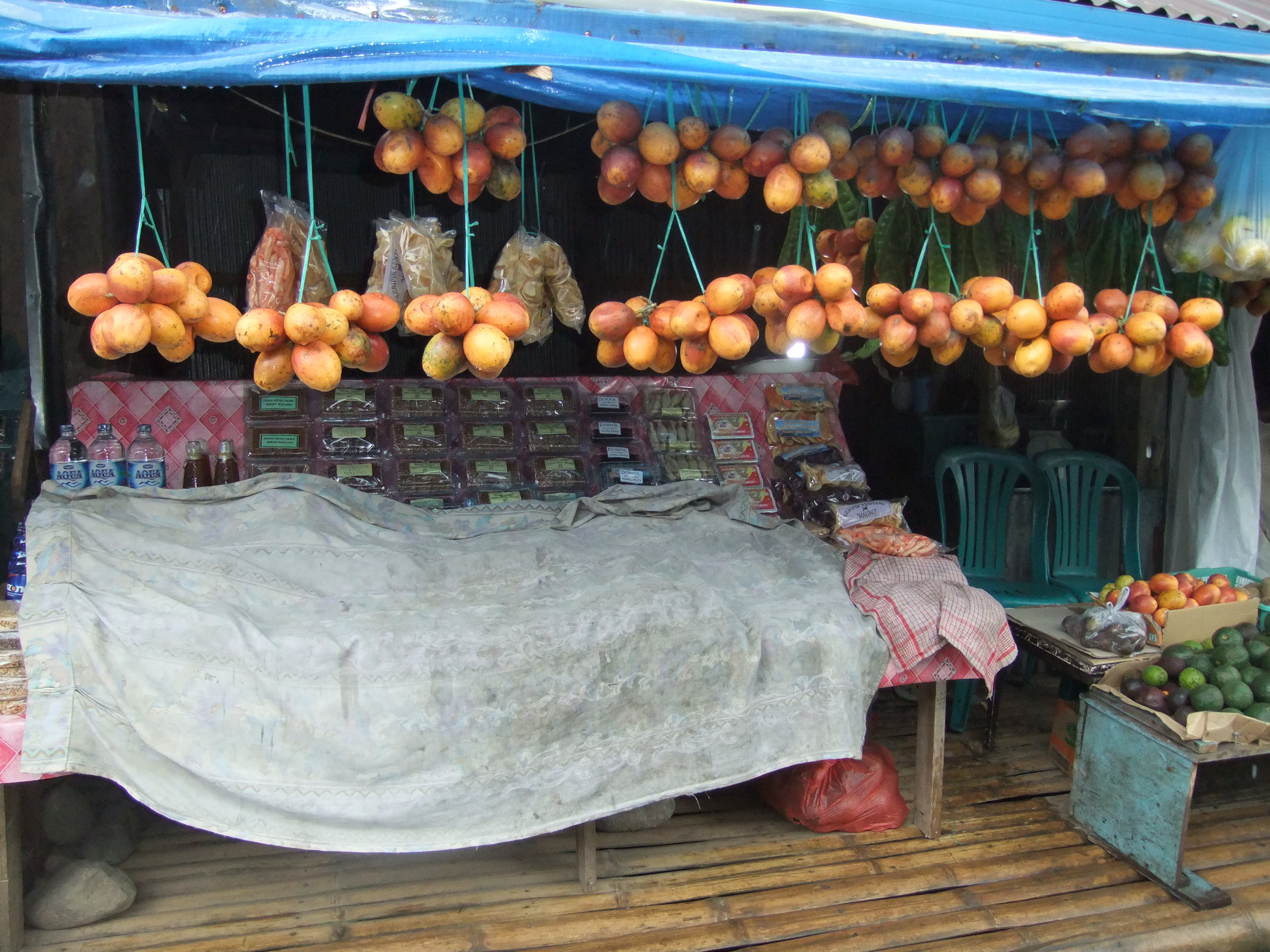
Passion fruit

In addition to corn, the South Sulawesi region also produces cassava, sweet potatoes, green beans, peanuts, and soybeans. Some luxuries such as hybrid coconuts, cocoa, coffee, pepper, vanilla, tea, cashews, and cotton are also produced. The Tata Guna Horan Agreement (TGHK) of 2004 protects a lot of the forest in South Sulawesi creating a limited output of timber-related products.

Tuna and snapper-grouper are caught in large proportions and seaweed is grown to eat. Farms also have all of the typical animals such as chickens, cows, pigs, goats, etc.

==== Manufacturing ====
A large part of the Sulawesi economy is based around resource extraction, most notably mining, forestry, and fishing. Being an island, Sulawesi has an extensive coastline and many of its inhabitants are involved in the fishing industry. One of the factors that contributes to the high GRDP of South Sulawesi is the mining sector among them nickel, gold, magnesium, iron, granite, lead, and stone products are mined.

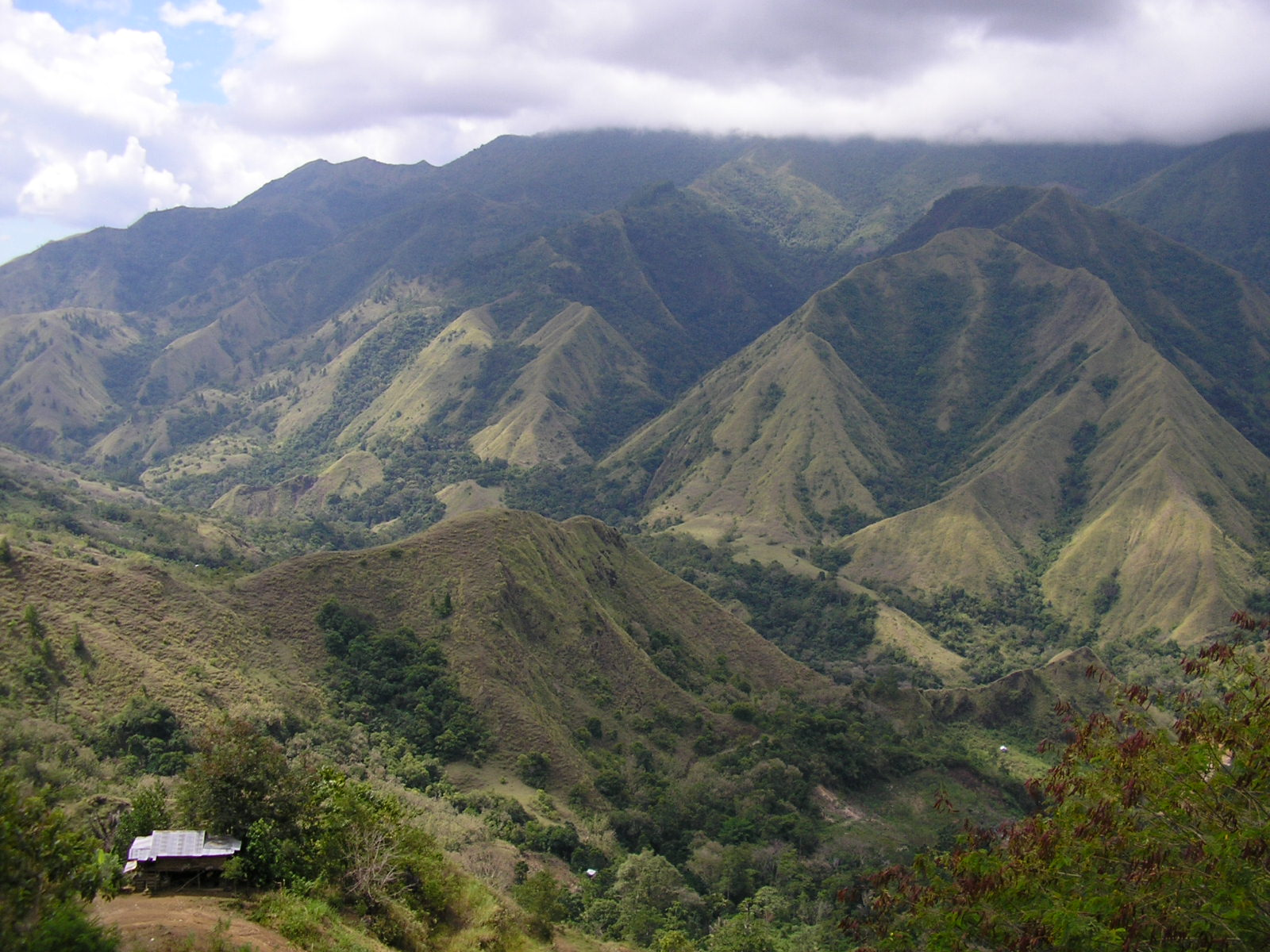
Mountains in South Sulawesi (Gunung Nona)

== Culture ==
=== Philosophy ===
- Siriʼ Na Pacce (ᨔᨗᨑᨗ ᨊ ᨄᨌᨙ) is one cultural philosophy of the Bugis-Makassar Society which must be upheld. If one is a siri' na pacce (not a person), then that person does not exceed the behavior of animals, because it has no sense of shame, self-esteem, and social concerns. The people of Bugis-Makassar teach morality in the form of advice about decency, prohibition, and the rights and obligations that dominate human action to preserve and defend himself and his honor. They have a very strong relationship with the view of Islam in terms of spirituality, where the strength of the soul can conquer the body. The core concept of siri' na pacce covers all aspects of community life and is the identity of the Bugis-Makassar.
- Siriʼ Nipakasiriʼ (ᨔᨗᨑᨗ ᨊᨗᨄᨀᨔᨗᨑᨗ) occurs when someone insulted or treated someone outside the boundaries of reasonableness. Then he or his family had to enforce siri' (ᨔᨗᨑᨗ) to restore the honour that has been deprived of, if not it would be called "mate siri' (ᨆᨈᨙ ᨔᨗᨑᨗ)" or dead status and dignity as a human being. The Bugis-Makassar would rather die than live without siri'.
- Siriʼ Masiriʼ (ᨔᨗᨑᨗ ᨆᨔᨗᨑᨗ) is a way of life that intends to maintain, improve, or achieve a feat performed by earnest and hard.

=== Traditional costume ===
Baju Bodo (ᨅᨍᨘ ᨅᨚᨉᨚ)[Mks] or Waju Tokko (ᨓᨍᨘ ᨈᨚᨀᨚ)[Bug] is the traditional costume of the women. Baju Bodo is rectangular and is usually short sleeved. According to customs, every color of the clothes worn by women shows the age or the dignity of the wearer. Clothing is often used for ceremonies such as weddings. But now, Baju Bodo is worn in other events such as dance competitions or to welcome guests.

=== Traditional dance ===
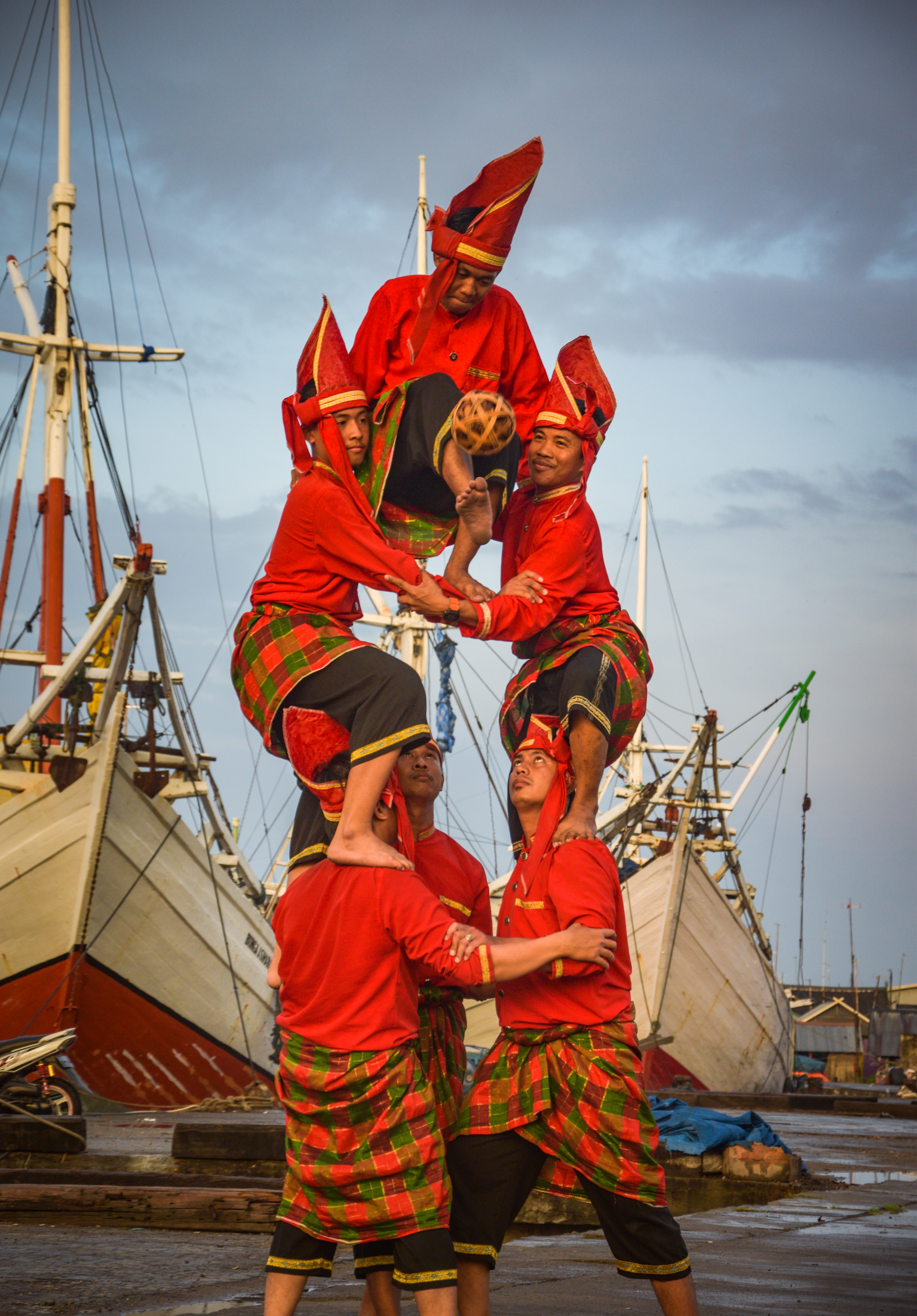
Paraga dance performance

The traditional dance in South Sulawesi is a combination of dance elements in the form of movement, music, lighting and fashion used by dancers. The combination tells the message about the story of the habits of the community in the past. Like there is a dance that tells about the war, an expression of community excitement and welcoming guests.

In this case, the Bugis and Makassar people, whose numbers dominate in representing dance styles in South Sulawesi. However, the Toraja people also have many traditional dances that are ritualistic. Some Mandar people also inhabit this province and have their own uniqueness in the arts. The rest are ethnic groups of Rampi, Seko, Rongkong, Wotu, Duri, Pattinjo, Maiwa, Enrekang, Pattae, Selayar, and Kajang, who also paint the distinctive art of South Sulawesi.

=== Traditional ship ===
The pinisiʼ or phinisi (ᨄᨗᨊᨗᨔᨗ) is a traditional Indonesian two-masted sailing ship. It was mainly built by the Konjo tribe, a sub-ethnic group but was, and still is used widely by the Buginese and Makassarese, mostly for inter-insular transportation, cargo, and fishing purposes within the Indonesian archipelago.

The hull of the ships looks similar to that of a dhow while the fore-and-aft rigging is similar to that of western schooners, although it might be more correctly termed to resemble a ketch, as the front mast is the larger. The large mainsails differ from western style gaff rigs though, as they often do not have a boom and the sail is not lowered with the gaff. Instead it is reefed towards the mast, much like a curtain, thus allowing the gaff to be used as deck crane in the harbor. The lower part of the mast itself may resemble a tripod or is made of two poles. Pinisi may be 20 to 35 meters long and can weigh up to 350 tons. The masts may be as high as 30 meters above the deck.

=== Traditional houses ===
South Sulawesi has three types of traditional houses. The most known are the Rumah Panggung (Ballaʼ/Bola) from Bugis Makassar and the Tongkonan from Toraja.

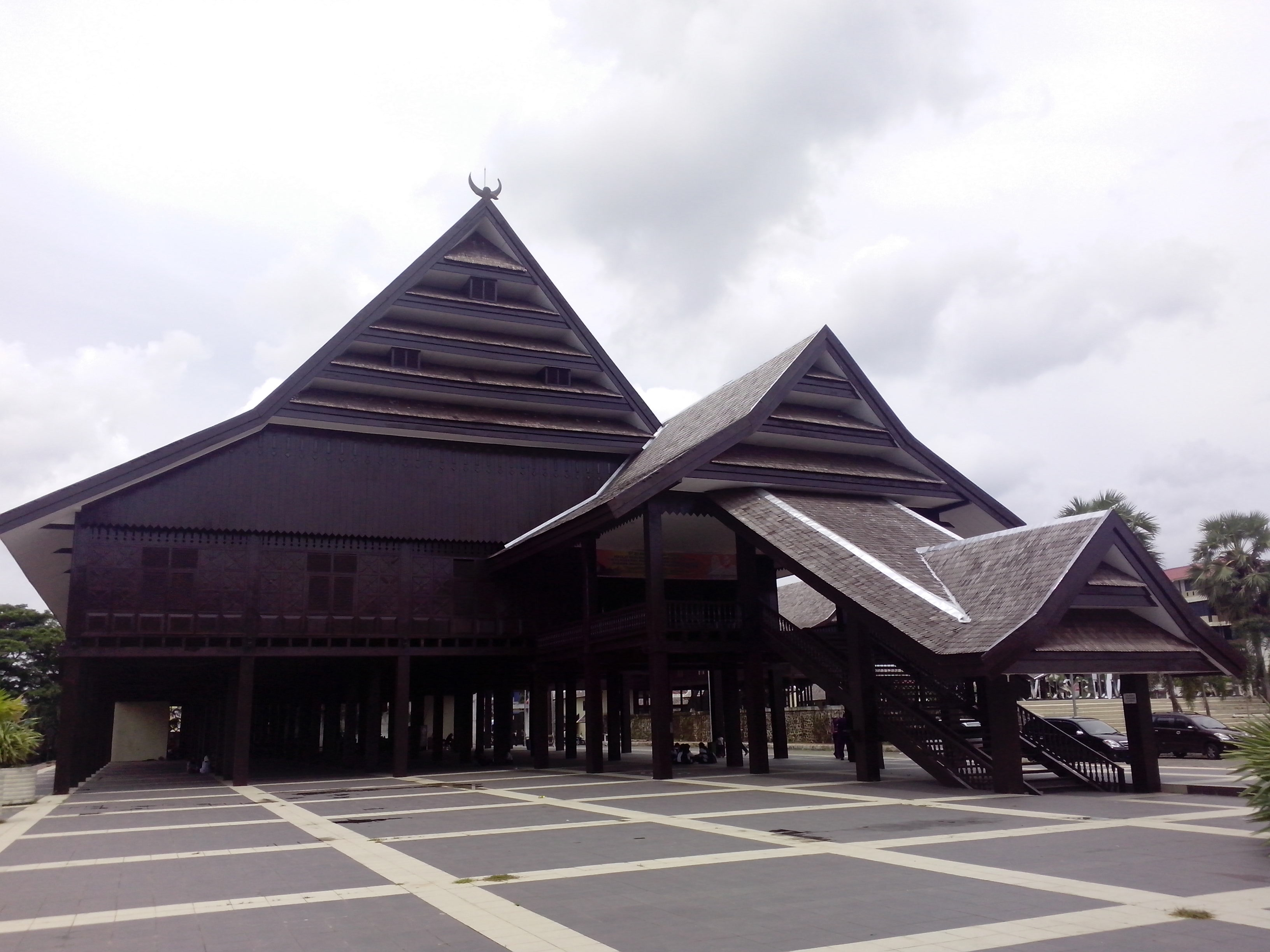
Tamalate Palace of Gowa Sultanate

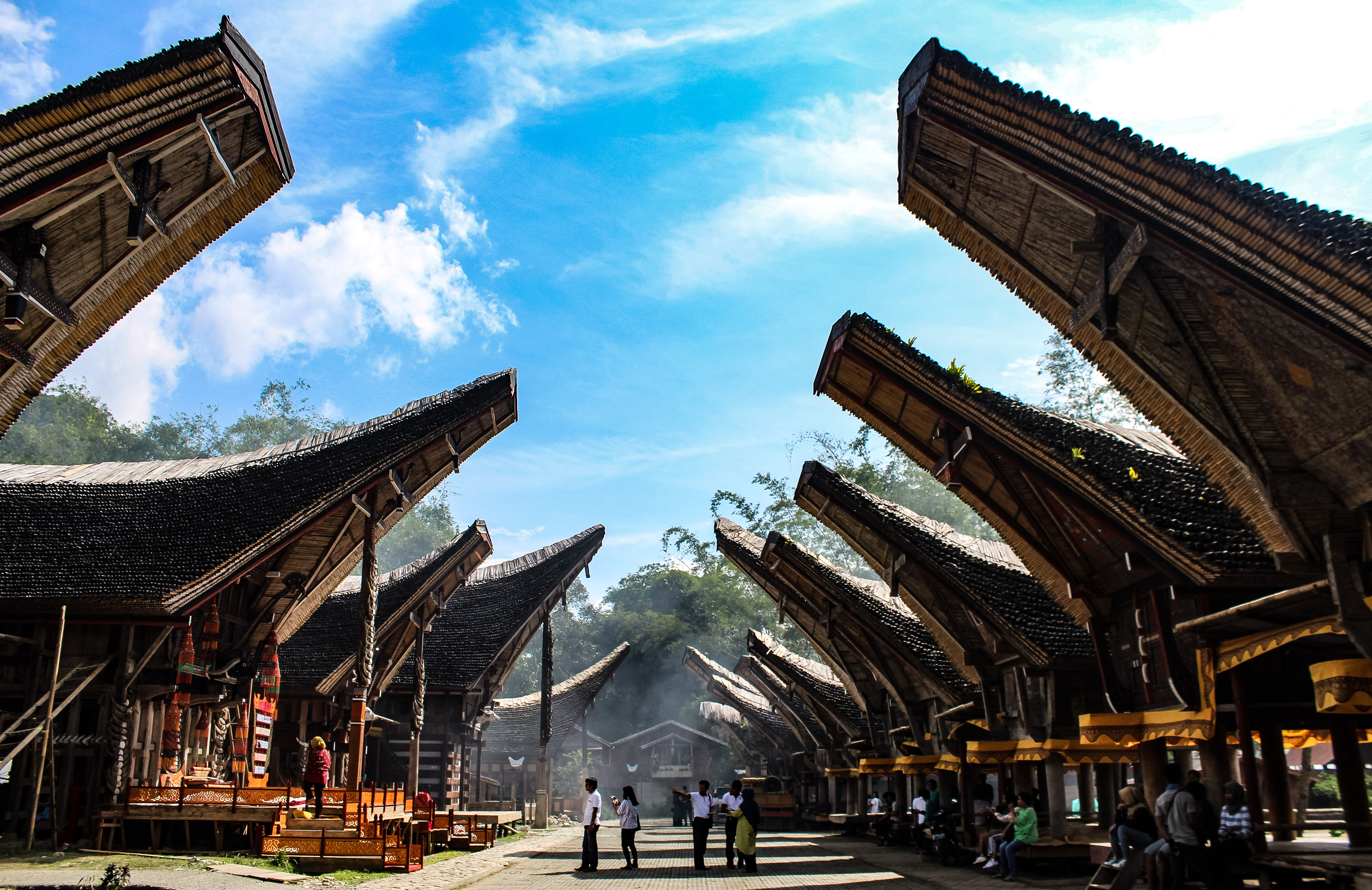
Ke'te' Kesu', Toraja Regency

- Rumah Panggung ( Ballaʼ ᨅᨒ[Mks] / Bola ᨅᨚᨒ[Bug] ) Some of the considerations for the building of the house are should it face the sunrise, overlook a plateau, or overlook a cardinal direction.

Usually a good day or a month to build the house is determined by those who have the skill in that regard. Building the house is preceded by a ritual ceremony.

- Tongkonan is the traditional ancestral house, or rumah adat of the Torajan people. Tongkonan have a distinguishing boat-shaped and oversized saddleback roof. Like most of Indonesia's Austronesian-based traditional architecture, tongkonan are built on piles. The construction of a tongkonan is laborious work and it is usually built with the help of all of one's family members. In the original Toraja society, only nobles had the right to build tongkonan while commoners lived in smaller and less decorated homes called banua.

=== Traditional food ===
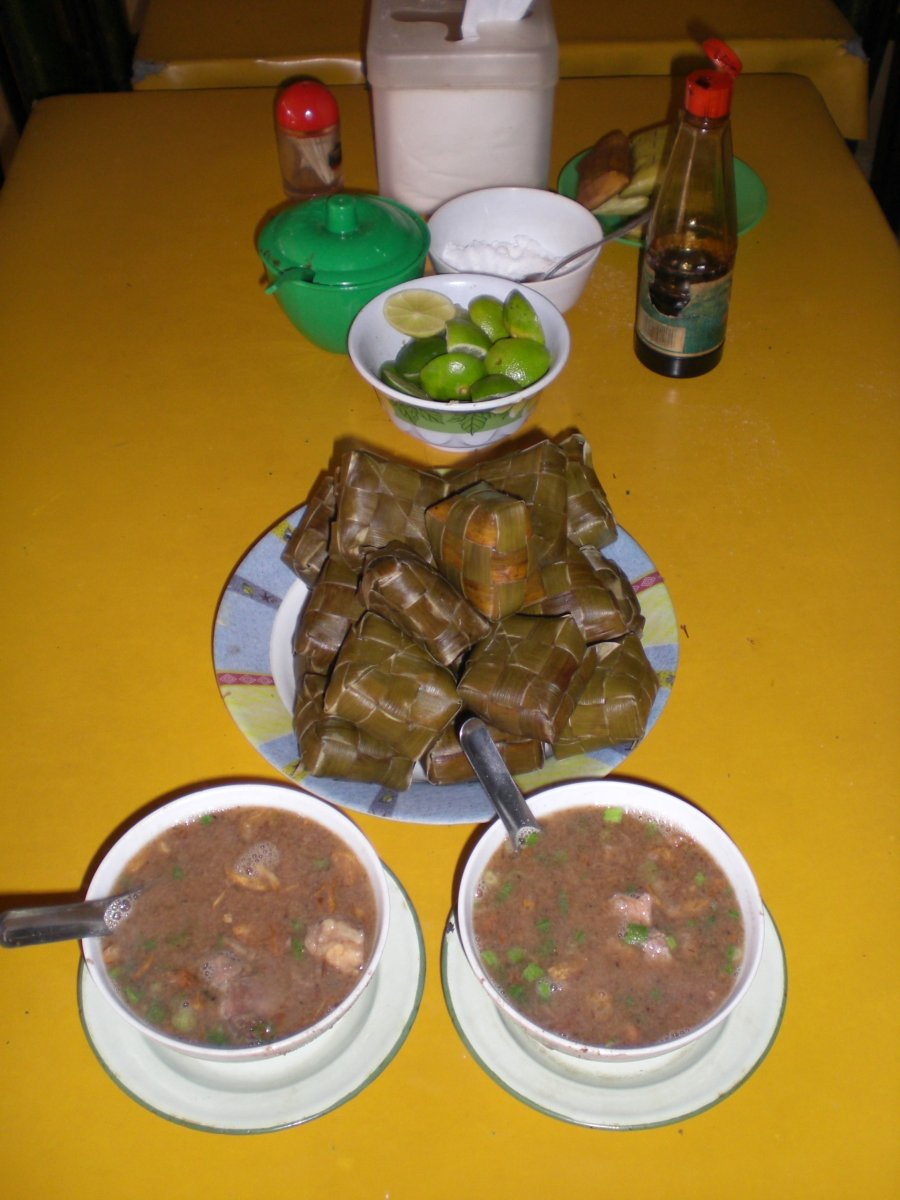
Coto Makassar, a traditional soup from South Sulawesi

Rice and other crops such as bananas are abundant so almost all dishes are, like the Bugis Makassar cake, made from rice and bananas. Coastal areas of South Sulawesi eat Bolu (milkfish), Shrimp, Sunu (grouper), and Crab.

In South Sulawesi, the traditional food is diverse, ranging from soup to traditional cakes.

=== Traditional game ===
Mallogo is a traditional game similar to golf, played with a coconut shell and bamboo.

=== Traditional weapons ===
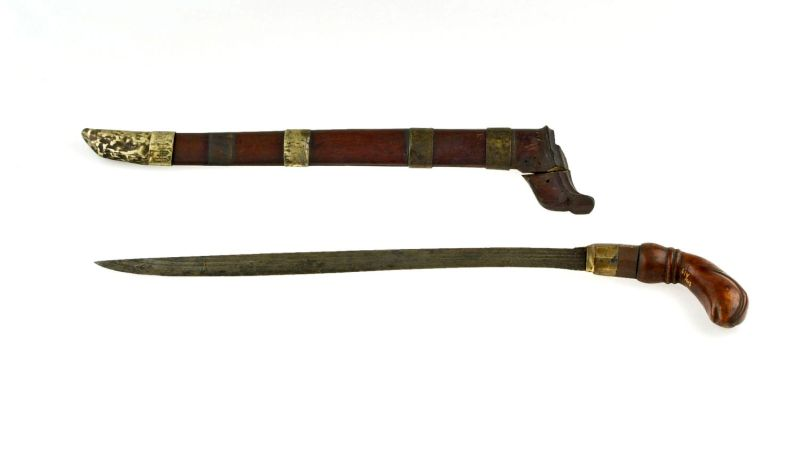
A badik or badek is a knife or dagger developed by the Bugis and Makassar people of southern Sulawesi, Indonesia.

- Badik (ᨅᨉᨗ)[Mks] or Kawali (ᨀᨓᨒᨗ)[Bug] A badik is a knife with a specific form developed by the Bugis and Makassar. The Badik is sharp, single or double sided, and has a length of about half a meter. Like with a kris, the blade shape is asymmetric and often decorated with prestige. However, different from the kris, the badik never had a ganja (buffer strip). Some versions from Sulawesi are decorated with inlaid gold figure on the blade called jeko. The handle is made of wood, horn or ivory in a shape of a pistol grip at a 45° to 90° angle and is often decorated with carvings. From Sulawesi, the badik soon spread to neighbouring islands like Java, Borneo, Sumatra, and as far as the Malay Peninsula, creating a wide variety of badik according to each region and ethnic group.

As with other blades in the Malay Archipelago, traditionally-made badik are believed to be imbued with a supernatural force during the time of their forging. The pamor in particular is said to affect its owner, bringing either well-being and prosperity or misfortune and poverty. Aside from being used as a weapon and hunting tool, the badik is a symbol of cultural identity in Sulawesi. The Bugis and Makassar people still carry badik as part of their daily attire. The badik is worn on the right side, with the butt end of the handle pointing to the rear.

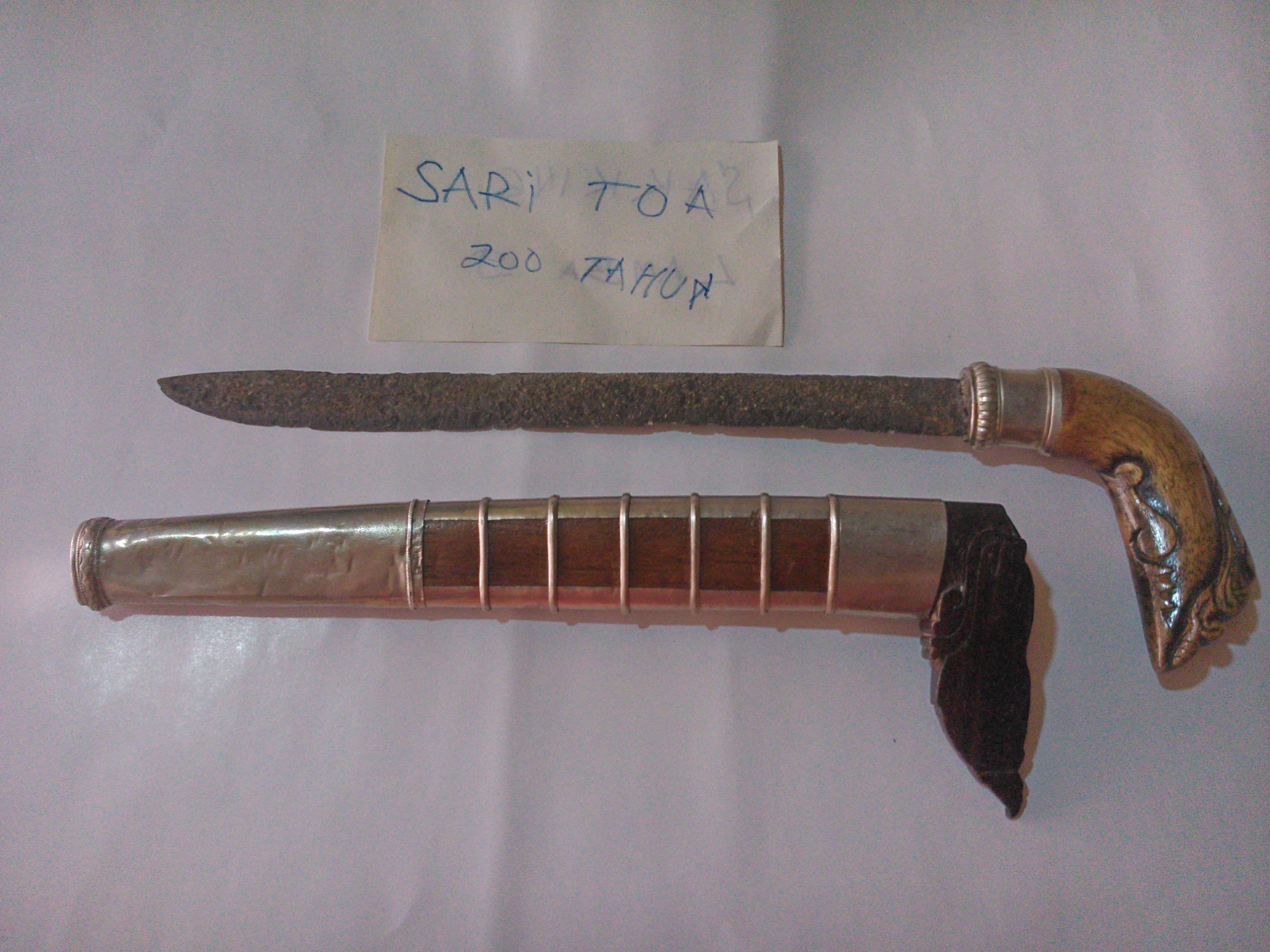

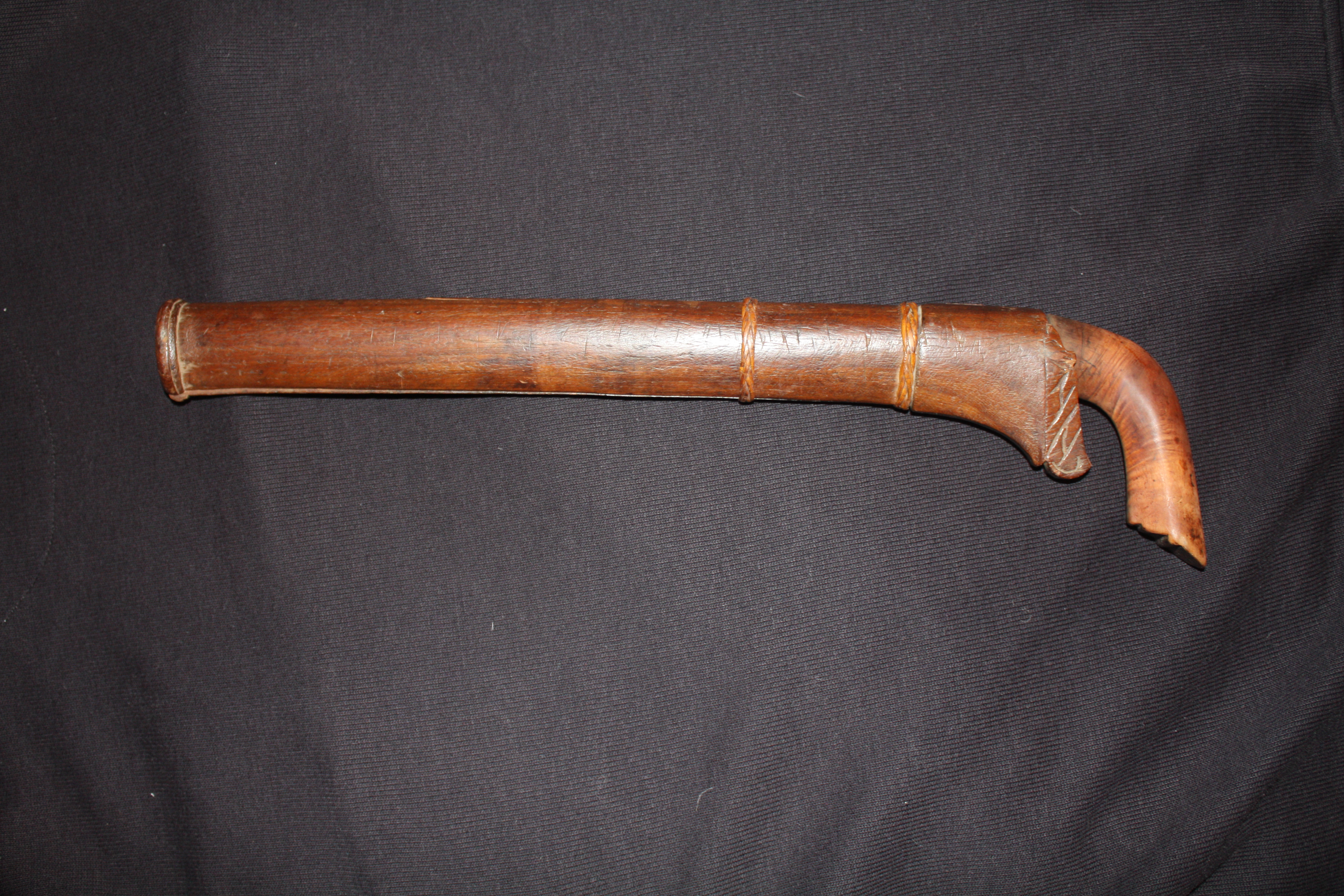

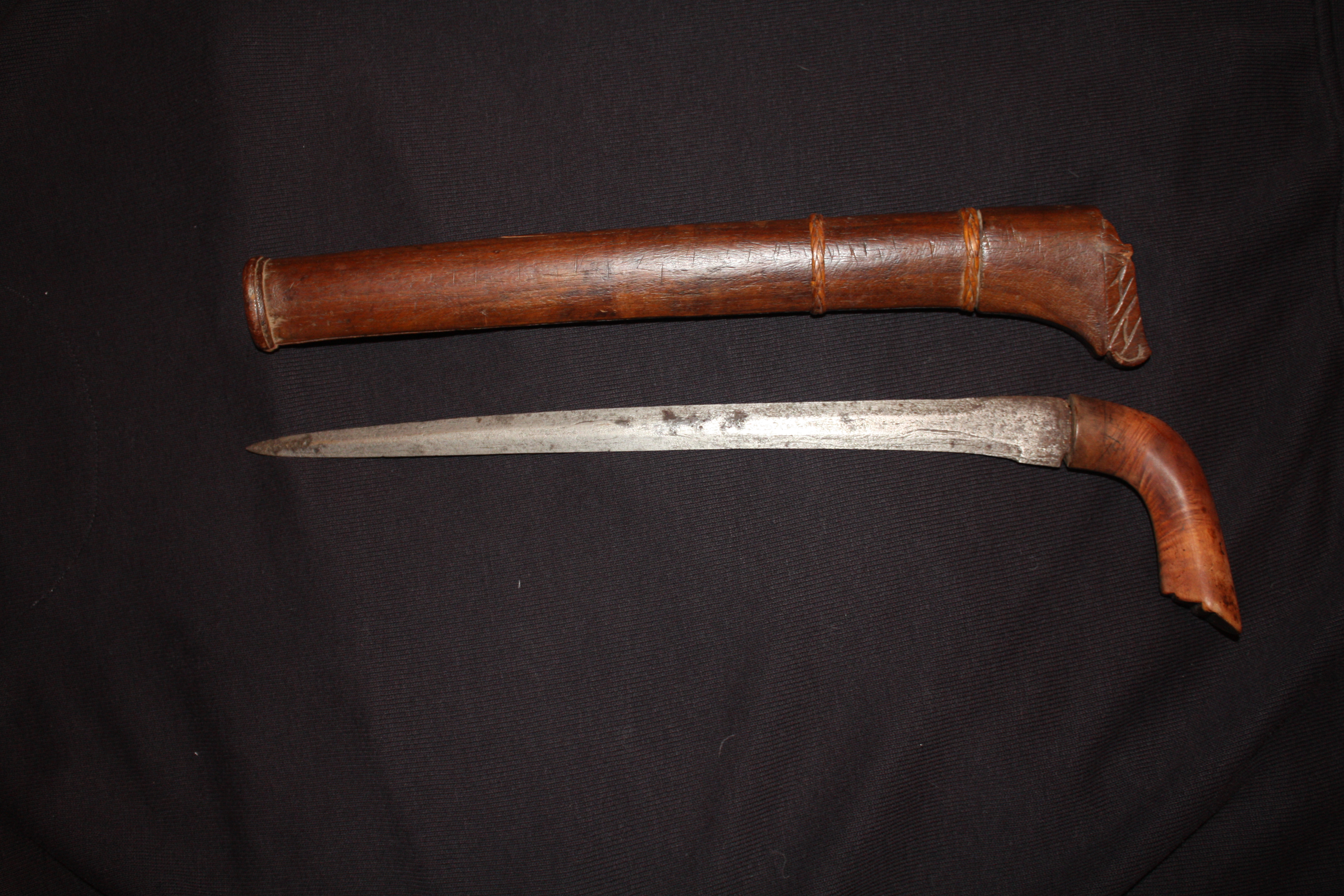

== Transportation ==
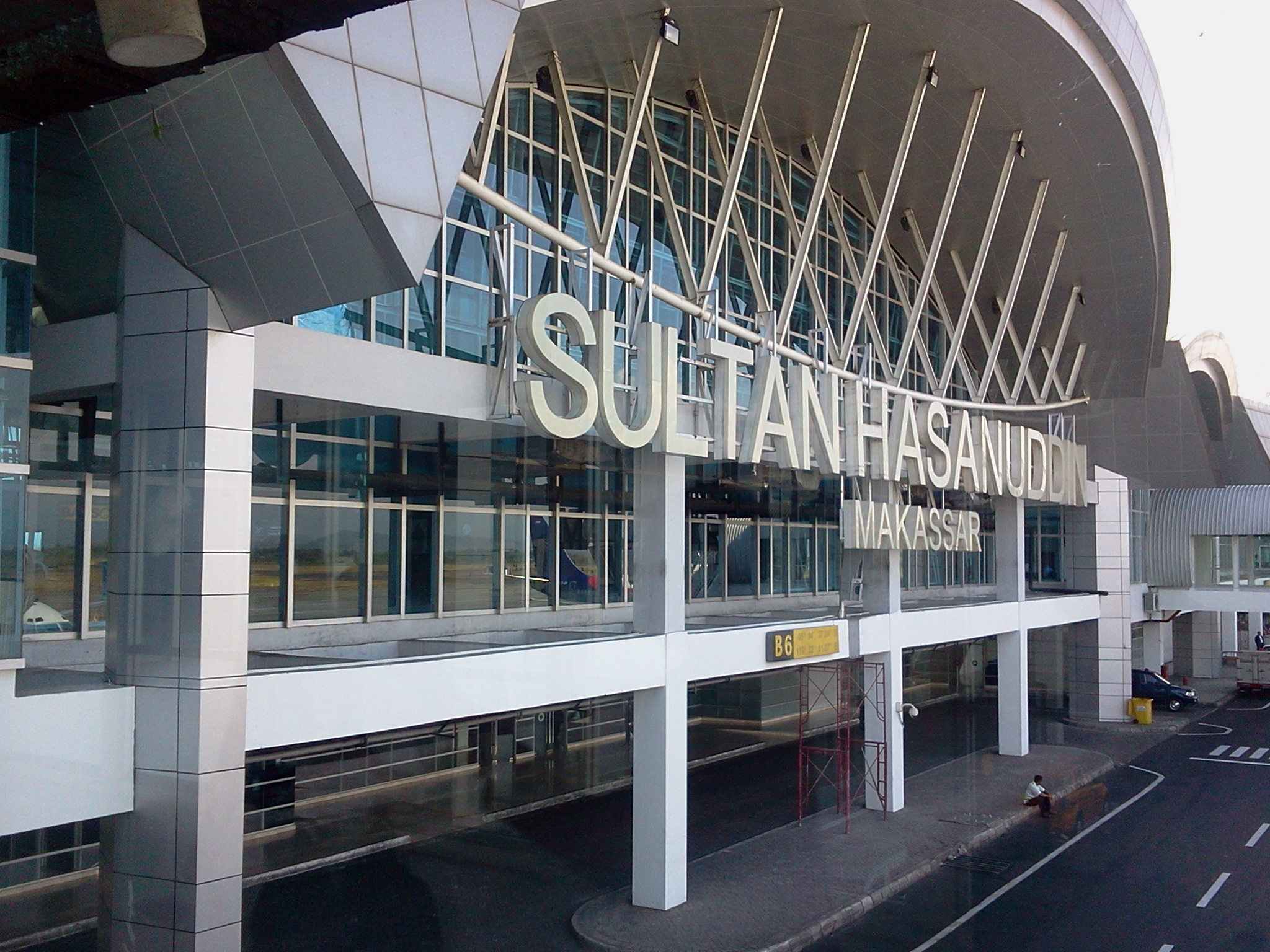
Sultan Hasanuddin International Airport

Trans-Sulawesi Railway is being constructed. It will connect Makassar and Parepare. 44 km of the railway, connecting Barru to Palanro is targeted to operate in the end of 2018. The entire Makassar-Parepare railway, with a length of 150 km, will be completed in 2019.

Airports in South Sulawesi include Sultan Hasanuddin International Airport (Makassar, Maros); Palopo Lagaligo Airport (Palopo); Pongtiku Airport (Tana Toraja); Haji Aroepala Airport (Selayar); Andi Jemma Airport (Masamba); Sorowako Airport (Sorowako); and Arung Palakka Airport (Bone).

Ports include Soekarno-Hatta (Makassar), Tanjung Ringgit (Palopo), Nusantara, (Pare-Pare) and Pattumbukang (Selayar).

== Coat of arms ==
The coat of arms of South Sulawesi consists of several elements: a star, rice and cotton, Fort Somba Opu, a badik dagger, mountains and rice fields, a pinisi ship, a hoe, a cogwheel, and a coconut. The emblem also features an inscription in Lontara script reading Toddo' Puli, which means "Steadfast in Faith".

- The star symbolizes faith in God Almighty.
- Rice and cotton represent prosperity.
- Fort Somba Opu symbolizes bravery and heroism.
- The badik is the traditional weapon of South Sulawesi.
- The mountain and rice fields represent the foundation of a socialist society in Indonesia.
- The pinisi ship symbolizes the maritime spirit of the Makassar sailors.
- The hoe represents the agrarian nature of the people.
- The cogwheel represents industry as the backbone of the province.
- The coconut fruit represents the agricultural produce of South Sulawesi.

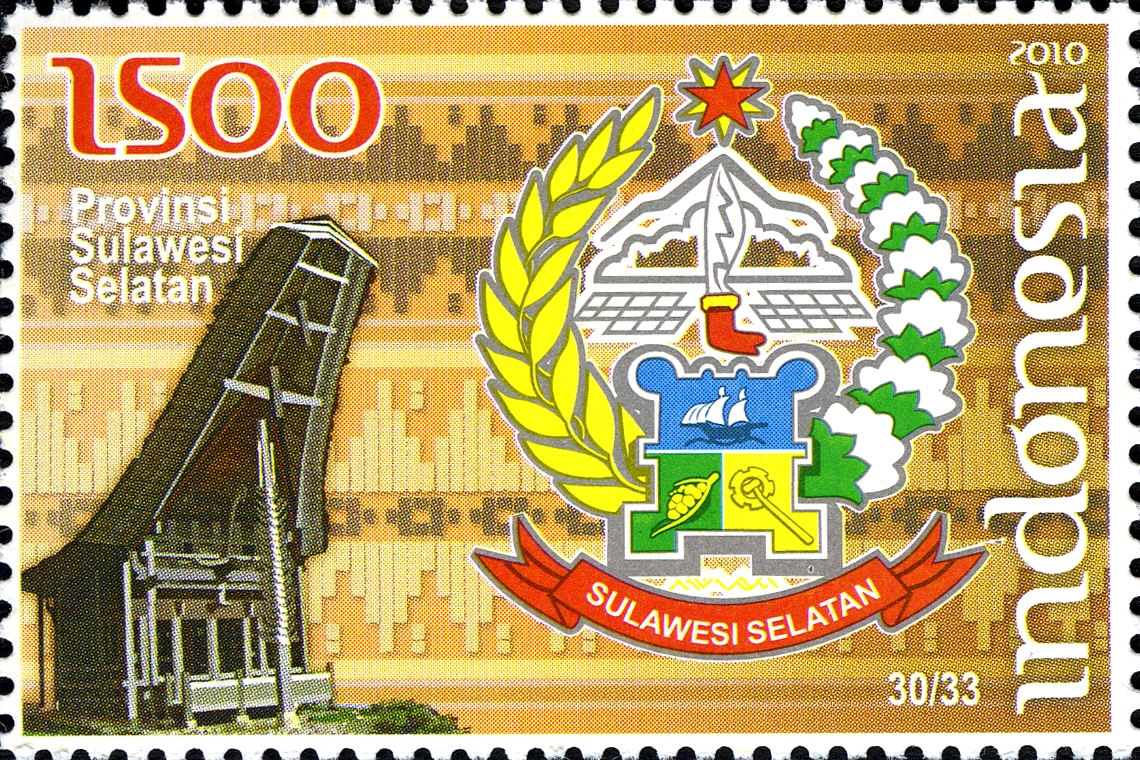
Stamp featuring the coat of arms of South Sulawesi

== See also ==
- Ma'jonga
- Polewali-Mamasa
