= Mallogo =

Mallogo is a traditional game that came from South Sulawesi, Indonesia. In the language of Bugis it is called Mallogo and in the language of Makassar it is called Allogo. The name means honesty and sportsmanship.

In the past mallogo was played by all the people of South Sulawesi, both commoners and nobles. The two groups used differing types of logos. The common people used a coconut shell while the nobility used logo of water buffalo, zinc, or gold-plated iron for the nobility. The game is played by two or more people, usually at the edge of a rice field.

Each team selects a sweepstakes or maccede. The lucky team shoots first (MaLLio-lio) aimed at a logo that is set up at a distance of 2 meters. Each participant has the right to shoot up to 3 times, but if none of the shots hit the target, then the player is deemed void. Hitting the target, allows the player to shoot up the last goal. Any player who can shoot target at a distance of 20 meters is the winner.
