= Badik =

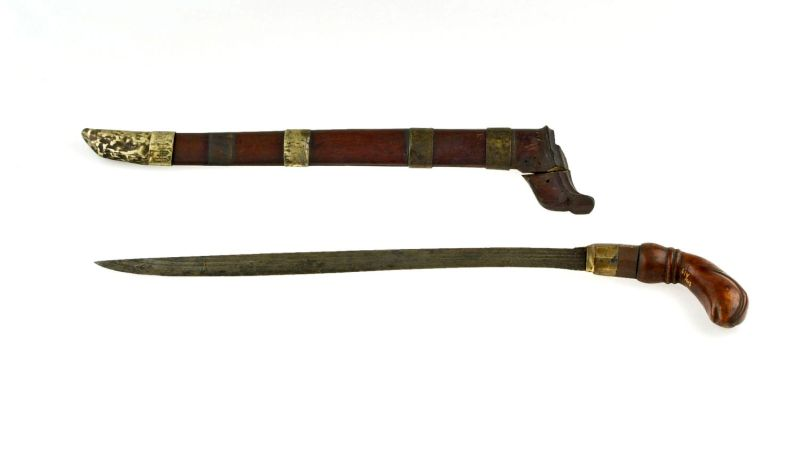
- Pre-1931 badik
- Type: Knife, dagger
- Place of origin: Indonesia (Sulawesi)

Service history
- Used by: Bugis people, Makassar people, Mandar people

Specifications
- Length: 20–30 cm (7.9–11.8 in)
- Blade type: Single edge, convex grind
- Hilt type: Wood, horn, ivory
- Scabbard/sheath: Wood, horn, ivory

The badik or badek (Makassarese: ᨅᨉᨗ badiʼ, Buginese: ᨀᨓᨒᨗ kawali) is a knife or dagger developed by the Bugis and Makassar people of southern Sulawesi, Indonesia.

== Description ==
The badik consists of three parts, namely the handle and blade, as well as the sheath or scabbard. It comes in a great variety of shapes and sizes. The badik can have a straight, curved, bulbous or wavy, single- or double-edged blade. The blade is smooth or with hollow sections (fullered). The point of the blade can be either pointed or rounded. Like the kris, the shape of the blade is asymmetric and often shows patterns typical of pamor (pattern welding steel commonly known as Damascus steel). However, it differs from the kris in that the badik does not have a ganja (a buffer strip steel). Some versions from Sulawesi are decorated with inlaid gold figure on the blade called jeko. The handle is made of wood, horn or ivory in a shape of a pistol grip at a 45° to 90° angle or similar in a bent shape often decorated with carvings. From its native Sulawesi, the badik soon spread to neighbouring islands like Java, Borneo, Sumatra and as far as the Malay Peninsula, creating a wide variety of badik styles according to each region and ethnic group. There are many versions made and used throughout the Indonesian archipelago alone.

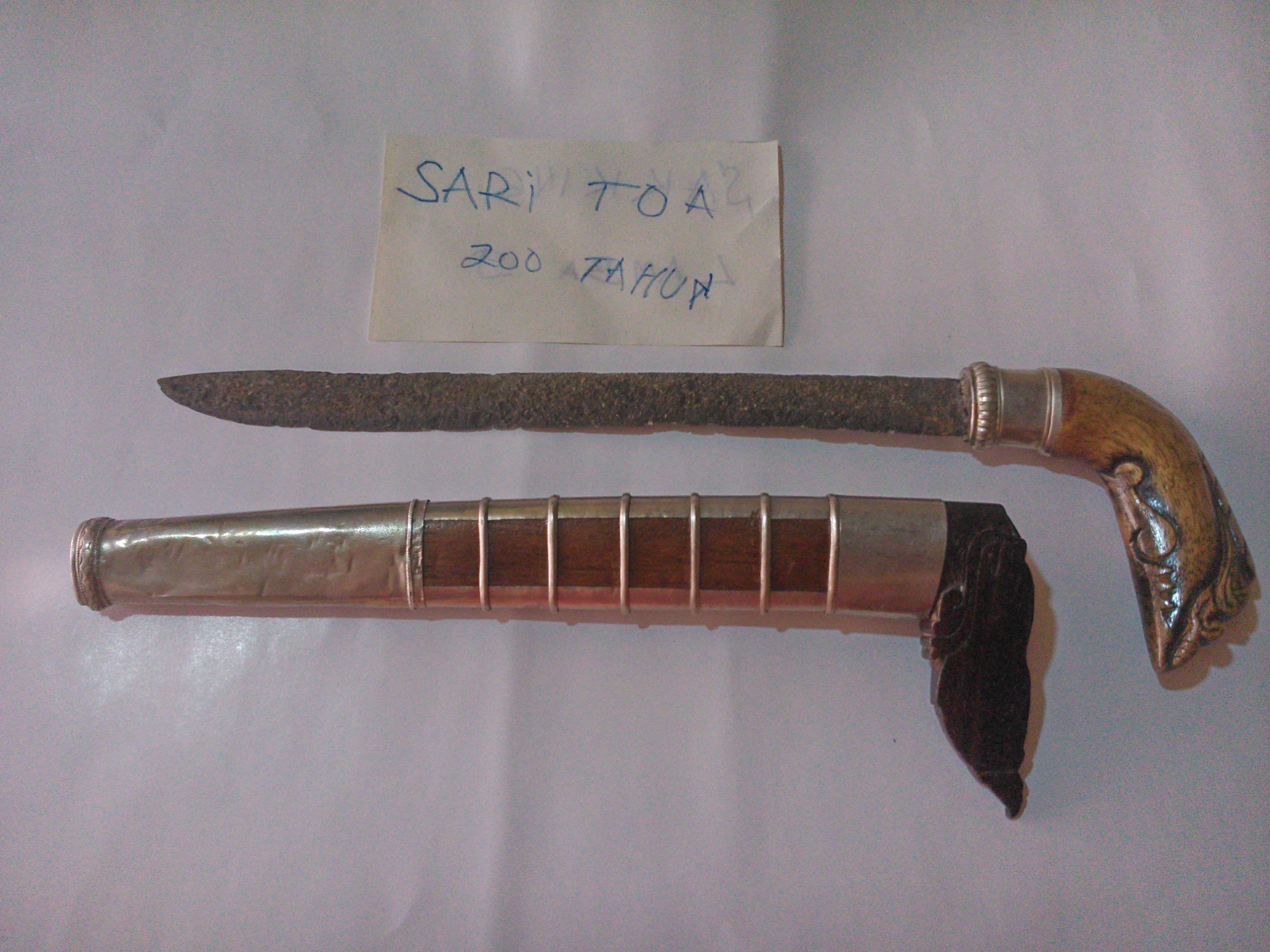

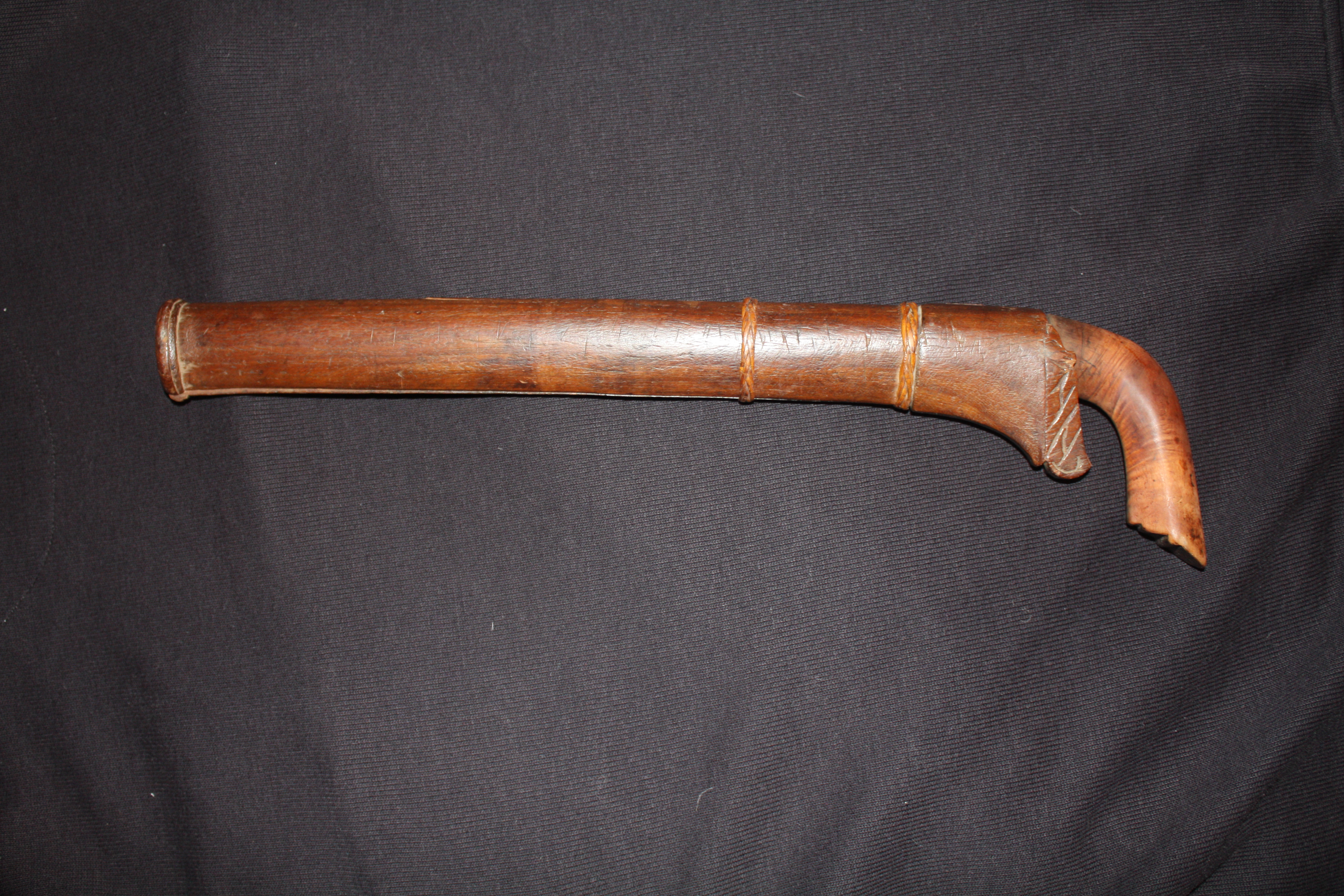

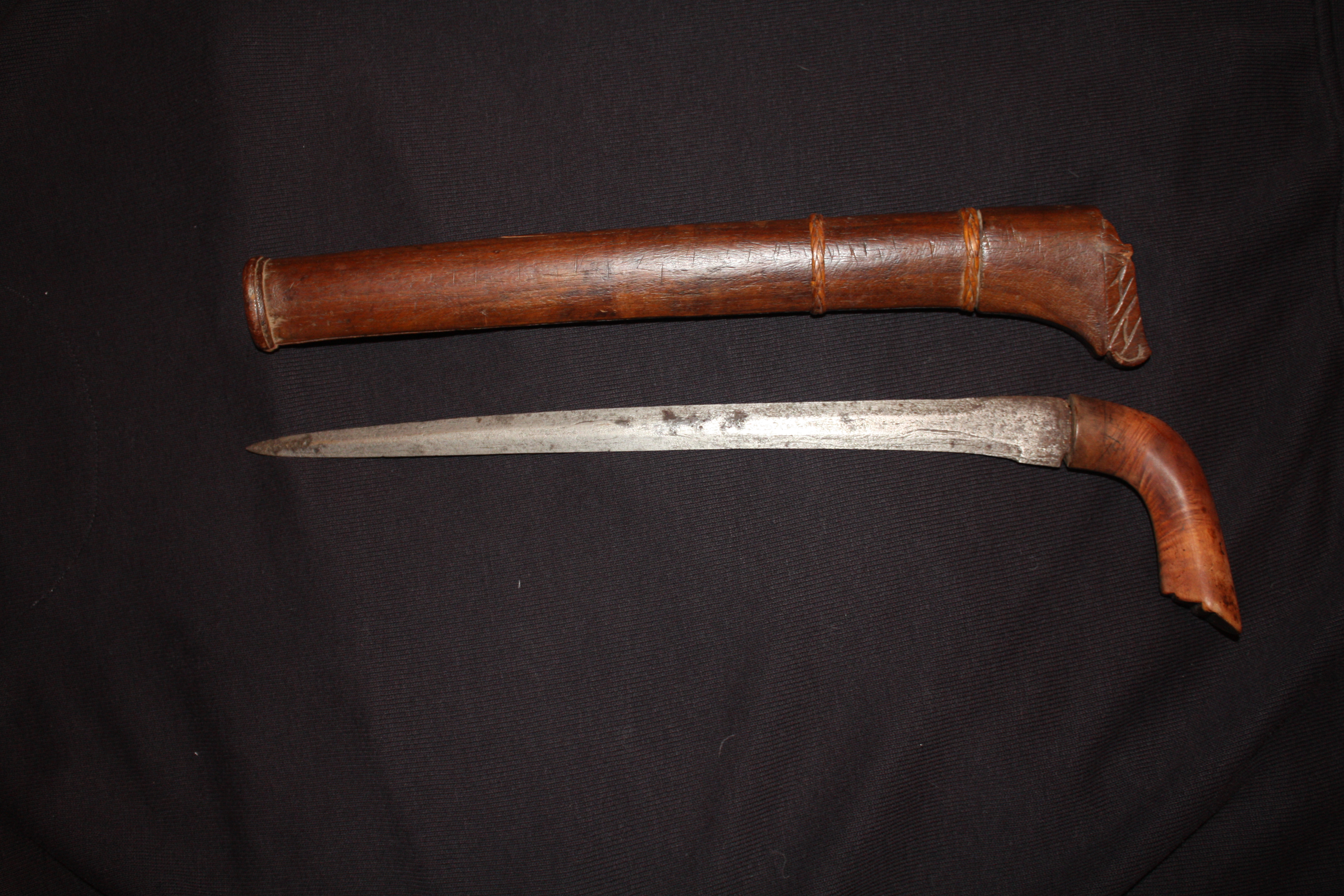

== Culture ==
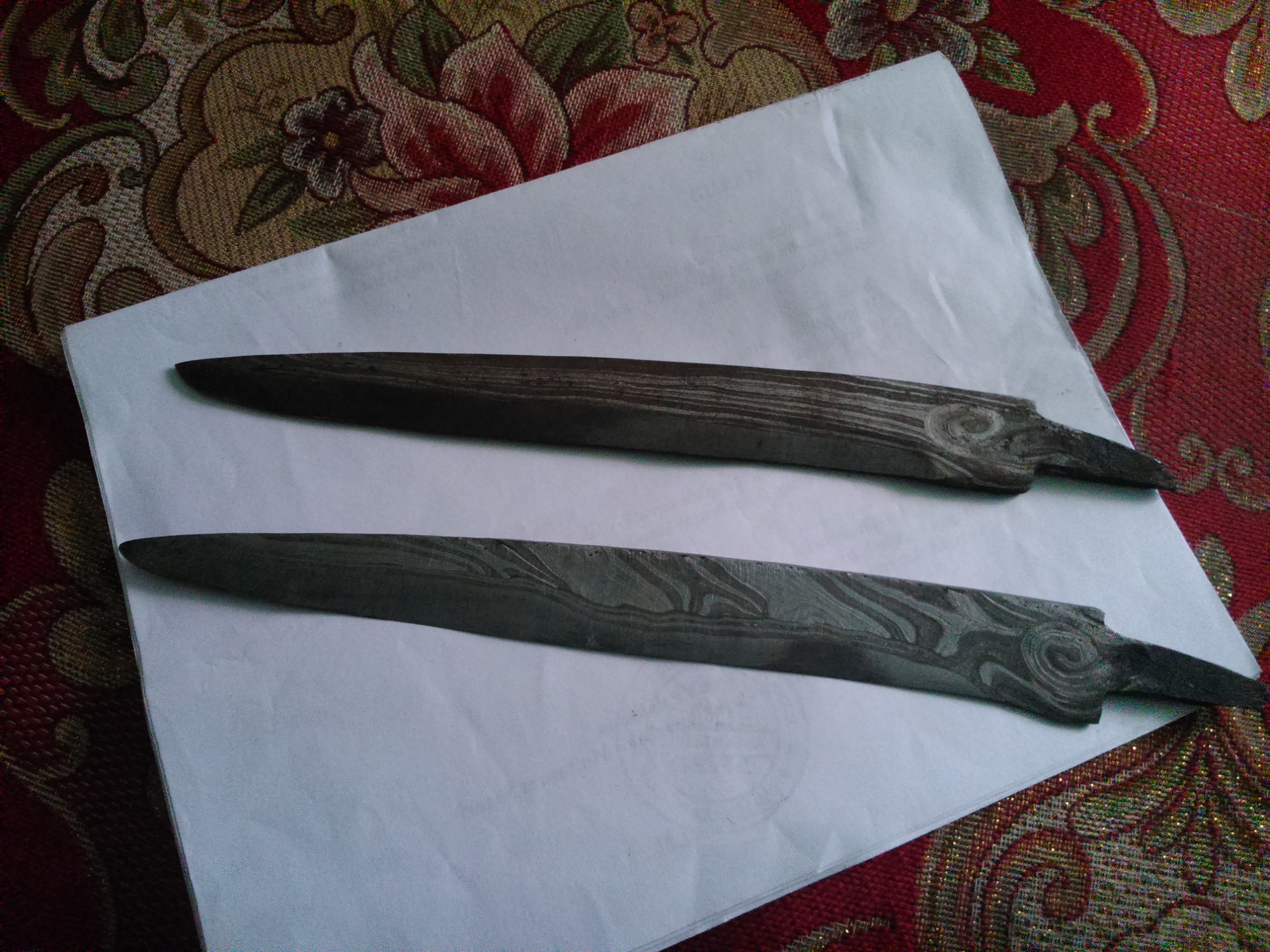
Examples of pamor found in badik blades.

As with other blades in the Malay Archipelago, traditionally-made badik are believed to be imbued with a supernatural force during the time of their forging. The pamor in particular is said to affect its owner, bringing either well-being and prosperity or misfortune and poverty. Aside from being used as a weapon and hunting tool, the badik is a symbol of cultural identity in Sulawesi. In the colonial era, it was considered a pity if a man died without his badik. As recently as the 1960s, the badik was worn as part of daily attire and badik crimes were reported regularly. The Bugis and Makassar people still carry badik on ceremonial occasions today.

The badik is worn on the right side, butt end of the handle pointing to the rear; it may also be positioned at their left side providing the butt end of the handle points to the rear. When the weapon is shifted from the right to the left side, or when worn at the left, handle reversed facing forward, it is signatory of impending combat.

=== Duels ===
The traditional form of duelling among the Bugis-Makassar community was called sigajang laleng lipa (in Bugis language), sitobo lalang lipa or sibajji lalang lipa (in Makassarese language) in which the duellists fight in a sarong. The challenger stands with a loosened sarong around him and respectfully invites the other man to step into the sarong. The sarong itself is kept taut around both their waists. When both men are inside, an agreement to fight til death and thereafter shall be no hereditary grudge nor will any party be allowed to question the duel, shall be made. If both fighters agree, they then engage each other with badik within the confined space of a single sarong. Because avoiding injury is near-impossible even for the victor, this type of duel was considered a sign of extraordinary bravery, masculinity and the warrior mentality. Although true sitobo lalang lipa are no longer practiced, enactments of these duels are still performed at cultural shows today.

== Techniques ==
The badik is the main weapon in Bugis and Mangkasara styles of pencak silat. The Badik almost always is brought into action from the intended victim's side or rear. The Draw is made across the operator's body by slashing from left to right; the blade may be "feathered" (turned over) and another slash from the right to the left, but only if the first one fails to do the job. But it is the thrust which the Bugis and Makassarese rely most heavily upon. The blade of the Bugis badik is thinner than that of the Makassarese type. The latter, therefore, must be thrust with its blade flat if lethal penetration is to be achieved in rib areas; other areas of the victim's anatomy do not require this repositioning, but the Makassarese generally use the flat-blade tactic, and seek full penetration of the blade. The Bugis on the other hand, pinch the blade more often than do the Makassarese, with the fingers just below the place where the handle joins the blade. And the thrust may be brought to penetration in a vertical or flat entry, to the depth of the pinch grip. Lethal penetration in selected vital anatomical targets can be surely made with less than 3 in (76 mm) of the blade

== See also ==
- Rencong
- Keris
