= Sigajang laleng lipa =

Dueling tradition of the Bugis people

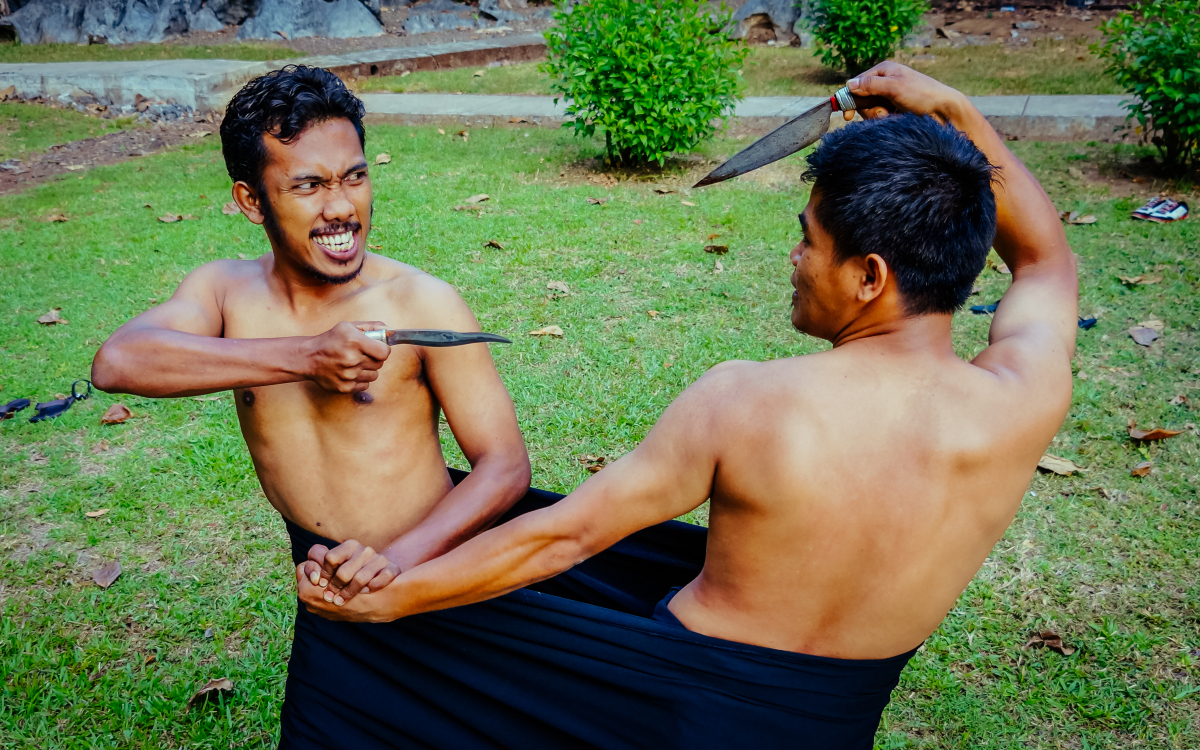
Two men are demonstrating sitobo lalang lipa using a badik weapon.

Sigajang laleng lipa or sitobo laleng lipa (Lontara: ᨔᨗᨈᨚᨅᨚ ᨒᨒ ᨒᨗᨄ) is a dueling tradition originating from the Bugis people of South Sulawesi, Indonesia. The name "sigajang laleng lipa" literally means "fighting inside a sarong" in the Buginese language. This tradition emerged as a way to resolve serious disputes or conflicts related to self-esteem. The two disputants would enter a sarong and fight using badik, a traditional Bugis weapon, until one or both were killed. The movements of Sigajang Laleng Lipa are usually performed accompanied by flutes and kendang for entertainment.

Today, with the expansion of law enforcement in Indonesia, the sigajang laleng lipa tradition to resolving disputes or conflict is becoming rarer and is now preserved as an artistic performance, without the use of dangerous items.

== Significance ==
The sigajang laleng lipa tradition show the cultural values of the Bugis people, especially in siri or self-respect. In Bugis culture, there are three important concepts that must be upheld, namely: ade (tradition), siri (shame or self-respect) and pesse (affection). The siri aspect is the most dominant, so that conflicts concerning someone honor can occur. This tradition is not just a physical fight, but also a symbol of the final struggle to maintain one's dignity and honor. The sarong (lipa) in this tradition symbolizes unity and togetherness between the Bugis people, because two people in conflict are forced to share a narrow space in one sarong, creating equality in the fight. The main values contained in this tradition are alempureng (honesty), agettengeng (steadfastness), and awaraningeng (courage), all of which are part of the identity of the Bugis people.
