= Ma'jonga =

Indonesian horses rider and hunter

Ma'jonga is a traditional horse riding and hunting competition from South Sulawesi, Indonesia.

== History ==
At the time of many kingdoms still held the power in South Sulawesi, horse competition was a great value of pride. Skill of riding horse was the absolute prerequirement to participate in Ma’jonga or hunting deer event which was organized by king. To the common people, Ma’jonga was the moment where they could show their hunting skill and could raise their lower status to higher status as well. Ma’jonga competition was usually arranged by a king for his family pleasure. It was arranged in the yard inside the jungle. Deer from jungle were driven into the yard for being hunted by hunters. While the king and noblemen were watching from a tower. Hunters were riding their horses and holding tado, a wooden stick with lasso in its tip for catching deer. Tough chasing after deer requires a lot of shrewdness, more a hunter became shrewd both riding and catching dee, more the respects he got.

== Recent event ==
Actually riding horse tradition can be found in every village or town in Sulawesi. From Manado in the north to Jeneponto in the south, where is best known as horse village. The tradition has survived for hundred of years in South Sulawesi, but we will face it in the different style now. Formerly it was a hunting event but now it was organized only for amusement and performance event. It became the predilection or hobby for many people from children to adult. Many of the jockeys are adolescents or younger people. They usually came from traditional horse breeder families. People regarded horses as a symbol of masculinity.

Riding horse event once has been absent for over 20 years, because it was identical with gambling. In December 2006, lastly it was opened in Makassar's Parangtambung hippodrome.

== See also ==
- Bugis
- Indonesian Culture
