= Armorial of Indonesia =

Emblems and coat of arms

This is a list of emblems or coat of arms used in Indonesia. Indonesia is divided into 38 provinces, and each province is divided into regencies (kabupaten) and cities (kota). There are 416 regencies and 98 cities. Each province, regency, and city has its own emblem.

Many of the emblems incorporate rice and cotton (for prosperity and the fifth principle of Pancasila, a remnant from socialist heraldry popular during the guided democracy era); symbols marking Pancasila in entirety; as well as symbols marking the date Indonesia declared its independence, 17 August 1945.

== National ==
Coat of arms	Name	Description
National Emblem of Indonesia	Coat of arms of Indonesia	The supporter of Indonesian national emblem is the Garuda, a mythical bird from both Hindu and Buddhist mythology that invokes the pre-colonial Hindu and Buddhist kingdoms in the archipelago. Unlike most depictions of Garuda with anthropomorphic features, this emblem is modelled after the national bird, the Javan hawk-eagle recognizable for its crest. The Garuda symbolises strength and power, while the gold colour symbolises greatness and glory. The feathers on the Garuda of the Indonesian coat of arms are arranged so that they invoke the date of 17 August 1945, the date of the independence proclamation: there are 17 on each wing, 8 on the tail, 19 below the shield, and 45 on the neck. The Garuda clutches a scroll in its talons bearing the national motto "Bhinneka Tunggal Ika", an Old Javanese quote from 14th-century poem from the Javanese Majapahit Empire, which means "Unity in Diversity".
Pancasila	The Pancasila shield	The Garuda has an escutcheon or heraldic shield on its chest with five symbols. The shield is coloured red and white like the Indonesian flag and has thick black lines running horizontally on its center representing the equator, which passes through the Indonesian archipelago. Pancasila is a philosophical and foundational theory of the Indonesian state which contains five principles each represented by the a symbol: 1. The one almighty God, represented by a star on an inescutcheon.; 2. A just and civilized humanity, represented by a chain.; 3. A unified Indonesia, represented by a banyan tree.; 4. Democracy - led by the wisdom of the representatives of the People, represented by a bull's head.; 5. Social justice for all Indonesians, represented by rice and cotton.

== Provincial ==
No	Emblem	Name	Description
1	Emblem of Aceh	Coat of arms of Aceh	The Coat of arms of Aceh is called the Pancacita just like its motto, a sanskrit word which means "five hopes" each represented by symbols inside the emblem: justice is represented by scales, heroism represented by a rencong knife, prosperity represented by rice, cotton, and chimney, harmony represented by a mosque dome, and religiosity represented by a book a qalam pen. In addition, white represents purity, yellow represents glory, and green represents welfare.
2	Coat of arms of North Sumatra	Coat of arms of North Sumatra	A clenched fist wielding a chain connected to a shield represents the determination of the North Sumatran people, a five pointed star, shield, and chain represent the unity of the people to defend Pancasila, a factory, port, rubber tree, oil palm tree, tobacco leaf, and farmer represent the resources of the province, 17 sheaves of cotton, an 8-sided web, and 45 rice seeds represent Indonesia's proclamation of independence day, the Barisan Mountains in the background represent noble personality, a sense of unity, and gotong royong within society, and lastly, the motto "Tekun Berkarya, Hidup Sejahtera, Mulia Berbudaya" means "work diligently, live prosperously, and be noble culturally".
3	Coat of arms of West Sumatra	Coat of arms of West Sumatra	The emblem contains a mosque and a Rumah Gadang, traditional home of the Minangkabau people. It represents the west sumatran people and their traditional values and the Islamic religion. A star represents the first Pancasila principle: The one Almighty God, the waves represent the dynamic nature of the people, and the motto "Tuah Sakato" means "agreement to enforce the result of consensus decision-making to reach common goals". In addition, white represents purity, red represents courage, yellow represents greatness, black represents resilience and eternity, and green represents hope.
4	Coat of arms of Riau	Coat of arms of Riau	The emblem is a green shield with 45 links to represent the Indonesian year of independence, five waves represent Pancasila, the ship in the center is a "Lancang Kuning", a legendary boat of the Riau people, which symbolizes the Riau peoples history and their way of life as a people who depend on the sea, while a keris with a serindit head symbolizes heroism and struggle. Lastly, rice and cotton represent prosperity.
5	Coat of arms of Riau Islands	Coat of arms of Riau Islands	The emblem consists of a yellow five-pointed star representing the first Pancasila principle: The one Almighty God. A chain surrounding the shield represents the unity of the people, a white-sailed yellow boat in the center symbolizes spirit of solidarity and determination of the people to accelerate development of the province, 24 seeds of rice and 9 cottons represent the formation of the province on 24 September 2002, keris with serindit head represent struggle to develop this maritime province to reach prosperity, red Tepak Sireh, a traditional Malay metal container to store betel, used for chewing and various traditional ceremony, it symbolize friendship, 7 waves symbolize 1 July 2004 when the province officially function, the motto "Berpancang Amanah, Bersauh Marwah" means "Staked by Trust, Anchored by Dignity".
6	Coat of arms of Jambi	Coat of arms of Jambi	The emblem consists of a five-sided base symbolizing the Pancasilaic soul and spirit of the Jambi people, a mosque with 6 holes, 5 top foundations, 7 bottom foundations, and a keris representing the birth of the province on 6 January 1957, and the mosque itself representing the religion of the Jambi people. A Keris Siginjai, a legendary weapon from Jambi, symbolizes the struggle and heroism of Jambi people to defeat colonialism and tyranny. A Cerana, a traditional container to hold betel, symbolizes the holiness of the God. A Gong, a traditional musical instrument, represents the spirit of democracy, four lines below the gong represent the history of Jambi from the kingdom era to its formation as province, and the motto: "Sepucuk Jambi, Sembilan Lurah" means that Jambi consists of nine traditional regions.
7	Coat of arms of South Sumatra	Coat of arms of South Sumatra	In the center of the emblem is a lotus with five petals symbolizing the national ideology Pancasila. The Ampera Bridge is an iconic structure in South Sumatra, while around the bridge, a mountain and rivers represent the geography of South Sumatra. Above the lotus is a traditional South Sumatran roof with 17 points, 8 roof lines, and 45 roof tiles, it represent the Indonesian independence date. The motto "Bersatu Teguh" means "United (we) stands"
8	Coat of arms of Bengkulu	Coat of arms of Bengkulu	A star represents the One and Only God. Below the star is a cerana, a traditional metal container to hold betel representing tradition, a Rudus, a traditional sword representing heroism, and a Rafflesia arnoldii represent the nature of Bengkulu, rice and coffee symbolize prosperity, 18 waves symbolize the birth date of Bengkulu province (18 November 1968)
9	Coat of arms of Bangka Belitung Islands	Coat of arms of Bangka Belitung Islands	The emblem is a five pointed shield symbolizing the Pancasila. In the center is a map of Bangka Belitung representing the land, the people, the government, and the resources of the province. The map are inside a circle representing the unity of the people of Bangka Belitung to confront the globalized world, 27 seeds of rice symbolize the birth of the province based on the Law No. 27/2000. 31 peppers symbolize Bangka Belitung as the 31st province of Indonesia, while rice and pepper also symbolize prosperity. Between the rice and pepper is a tin ingot representing the natural resource of the country that has supported the economy of this region for more than 300 years. The emblem is coloured blue to represent the sea. The motto Serumpun Sebalai means The People of Bangka Belitung are a community (serumpun) working together with a sense of kinship (sebalai) to achieve their goals.
10	Lampung coat of arms	Coat of arms of Lampung	The emblem consists of rice and pepper representing the resources of Lampung. A Laduk and Payan represent heroism, and a Gong Gajah Mekhu symbolizes democracy. A traditional Siger crown symbolizes culture and tradition, a traditional umbrella represent protection and the motto Sang Bumi Ruwa Jurai in Lampung language literally means One Land, Two Peoples, which can be interpreted as Sang Bumi Lampung.
11	Coat of arms of Banten	Coat of arms of Banten	Below the text "BANTEN" is an outline of a mosque dome symbolizing the religious culture of the people. A star represents the first principle of Pancasila: The One and Almighty God, while the tower of the Great Mosque of Banten symbolizes great spirit with the guidance of the God. The Gate of the Kaibon Palace below the tower represents Banten as a gateway to global civilization and international trade. Rice and cotton symbolize Banten as an agrarian province, and the number of seeds refers to date of the Indonesian proclamation of independence. A, black mountain in the background represents the land and resources. A the one horned javan rhinoceros is the provincial animal and symbolizes the persistence of the society to defend justice and protected by law. The rhino ia standing on an airport runway representing Soekarno–Hatta International Airport. A half-gear below the mountain represents development and industry, a blue wave represents the sea, the motto "Iman Taqwa" is a concept in the Islamic faith written on yellow scroll representing unity.
12	Coat of arms of Jakarta	Coat of arms of Special Capital Region of Jakarta	Designed by the then governor Henk Ngantung during his tenure. The emblem is five-pointed escutcheon, or shield, to symbolize Pancasila, the Indonesian ideology, with an outline of a gate and Indonesian National Monument to represent Jakarta as a special city, not only as the capital of Indonesia but as a city where Proclamation of Indonesian Independence happened. Rice and cotton are symbol of resources tied with golden rope symbolize unity, wave represent the sea, and the motto "Jaya Raya" which means "Glory and Greatness" written in red to symbolize heroism. The colour gold symbolize the holiness and greatness of Pancasila, white represent purity, yellow and green represent prosperity, and blue background represent the far-reaching sky.
13	Coat of arms of West Java	Coat of arms of West Java	The emblem is an egg-shaped shield used by a previous kingdom and the background is coloured green to represents the richness of the soil. In the center is a kujang, a traditional weapon of the Sundanese people. The kujang has five holes on it to symbolize Pancasila. There are 17 seeds of rice and 8 cottons representing the date of the Indonesian proclamation of independence on 17 August. Below the kujang is a black mountain representing the terrain of the province which has many mountains. Below it are wavy lines to represent the rivers and seas and beside it is a checkered pattern to represent the rice fields and plantations. Between the wavy and checkered patterns is a white line to represent the dams and canals. The motto is the Sundanese words "Gemah Ripah Repeh Rapih". The first two words mean serene and prosperous, and the last two words mean peaceful and harmonious.
14	Emblem of Central Java	Emblem of Central Java	The emblem basic shape remembles that of a "Kundi Amerta", a ceremonial water jug. A five-pointed shape and a star symbolize Pancasila. Borobudur represents creativity, culture, and tradition, and twin mountains symbolize unity between local government and its people. The mountains, sea, and green background represents the natural geography of this province with its various resources as a source of livelihood for the Central Javan People. Below the star is a bambu runcing or sharpened bamboo, a traditional weapon to symbolize heroism, rice and cotton symbolize prosperity, red and white pennant on top symbolize nationalism. The motto "Prasetya Ulah Sakti Bhakti Praja" is a sanskrit word which means A vow and devotion with all might to build the nation and the country.
15	Emblem of Special Region of Yogyakarta	Emblem of Special Region of Yogyakarta	The emblem is called golong-gilig because it has a circle (golong) and a cylinder (gilig), which represent the philosophy of life. It is related to the first principle of Pancasila, "The one almighty God", as represented by a five-pointed golden star. The second principle, "Humanity", is represented by a winged central pole/monument (Saka guru), the third principle, "Unity", is represented by a red circle surrounded by a white circle, the fourth principle "Democracy" represented by an object below the central pole called an "Ompak", which is a traditional carved stone foundation with a lotus pattern, and the fifth principle, "Social justice", is represented by rice and cotton. The other meanings that can be found in this emblem are religion, education, and culture which is represented by a star and jasmine below it with three sepals. Within the red circle is sentence written in Javanese script: "Rasa Suka Ngesti Pradja, Yogyakarta Terus Mandiri" which means "with a sense of optimism to build Yogyakarta that stands on its own"
16	Coat of arms of East Java	Coat of arms of East Java	The emblem is a shield to symbolize peace and security, a star represents "The One and Almighty God", the Heroes Monument symbolizes the heroism of the people during the Battle of Surabaya, a volcano represents the geography of the province, around the heroes monument is a temple (candi) gate to symbolize struggle and patriotism, while a river, farmland, rice and cotton represent prosperity, in addition the rice and cotton have numerical significance that symbolize Indonesian date of Independence, the gear represents industry and sense of friendship to outsiders, and the motto "Jer Basuki Mawa Beya" means "Sacrifice is needed to achieve goals".
17	Coat of arms of Bali	Coat of arms of Bali	The emblem is pentagon to represents Pancasila, inside the pentagon is five-pointed star to represents "The One and Almighty God". Margarana monument is symbolizing heroism of Bali people, the monument itself is a memorial for Battle of Margarana, the struggle of Balinese led by I Gusti Ngurah Rai to prevent the restoration of Dutch rule. Candi bentar, a traditional temple gate to symbolize religiousness. Chain represents unity and gotong royong, Balinese fans to represent culture and tradition, red lotus represents the throne of Shiva, rice and cotton represent prosperity and the motto "Bali Dwipa Jaya" means Glorious Bali Island, in addition the color blue represents solidarity, yellow represents glory, white represents purity, and red represents courage.
18	Coat of arms of West Nusa Tenggara	Coat of arms of West Nusa Tenggara	The emblem is a shield to represents heroism and culture, inside the shield is star to represents Pancasila, Chain represent unity, rice and cotton represent prosperity, volcano represents Mount Rinjani, Dome shape represent religiousness, inside the dome is Javan rusa, the provincial animal. In addition, the color blue means loyalty, green means prosperity, white means purity, yellow means glory, black represent immortality, and red means courage to defend justice and truth.
19	Coat of arms of East Nusa Tenggara	Coat of arms of East Nusa Tenggara	The emblem is red-yellow coloured shield, inside the shield is a star to symbolize "The One and Almighty God", Komodo dragon, the provincial animal symbolize the natural richness of the province, rice and cotton represent prosperity, spear represents glory and greatness, banyan tree represents unity, and the text "1958" is the birth year of this province.
20	Coat of arms of West Kalimantan	Coat of arms of West Kalimantan	The emblem base is a five-pointed shield to represent Pancasila, the shield are coloured light green to represent fertility of the land. Inside the shield base is traditional Dayak shield, mandau, and keris to represent culture and tradition, each of them coloured white to represent holiness and purity. Straight white line in the center is symbolizing the equator which crossed the province. Rice and cotton represents prosperity. There are 17 cottons, 8 flames, and 45 rice seeds to represent Indonesia date of Independence. The rice and cotton are tied white four-pointed ribbon to represent "Catur Karsa" or four principles: sincerity, honesty, gotong royong, and kinship. The motto "Akcaya" is an Old Javanese word which means "Will never perish" written on a white three-fold scroll to represent three foundations of national revolution or universal ambition of Indonesian nations: Unity of Indonesian from Sabang to Merauke, spiritual and material justice and prosperity to society, and strengthen the relationship between all nations and states.
21	Coat of arms of Central Kalimantan	Coat of arms of Central Kalimantan	The emblem consists of sacred green jar (Balanga) to represents the potential resources of the province, the jar is surrounded by yellow rope made out of plant roots called "Tali Tengang", this rope is commonly used by fishermen and also used in traditional ceremonies, it represents unbreakable solidarity, the rope has 57 knots to represent the birth year of the province, inside the jar is traditional Dayaks shield or "Taliwang" and behind it is Mandau and Sipat or Blowgun to represents vigilance and endurance of the society to defend the country from inside and outside threat, the Taliwang are painted with pattern called "Haramaung Batulang, Pengadien Balikur Talawang" which means "Only tiger with muscle made out of wire, and bone made out of steel can stands against everything" it represents the struggle of the people to achieve justice and prosperous society. Rice and cotton represent prosperity, star represents Pancasila. Above the shield is Hornbill or "Enggang" the provincial animals to symbolize environmental protection, below the shield is musical instrument called "Galantung" which used to call people before announcing something or ceremonial purposes, it represents tradition and unity. Lastly, the motto "Isen Mulang" which means "Never Give Up" .
22	Coat of arms of South Kalimantan	Coat of arms of South Kalimantan	Shield represents vigilance and defense of the people, star represents the first principle of Pancasila: "The One and Almighty God", the house in the center is called Bubungan Tinggi, the traditional house of the Banjar people to symbolize culture. Diamond, rice, and rubber wood symbolize the resources of the province. The white ribbon represents the linkage of all aspect of life: food, clothing, culture, belief, etc. In addition, the color red represents courage, yellow means hope, green means fertility, white means purity, black means persistence. Lastly, the motto "Waja Sampai Kaputing" means "Keep Strong Until The End".
23	Coat of arms of East Kalimantan	Coat of arms of East Kalimantan	Shield represents defense of the people, star represents the Pancasila, traditional Dayak weapons like shield called "Telabang", mandau, and blowgun represents readiness and competence. The weapons are surrounded by oil droplets and dammar resin to represent resources of the province, if the droplet and resins amount were added it becomes 17 which is the date of Indonesian independence. Above the shield is the name of the province surrounded 24 knots of rattan to represents the birth day of the province: 1 January 1957 (1+1+1+9+5+7=24), and below the shield is the motto: "Ruhui Rahayu" which means "Perfect harmony with the blessing from God", in addition the color green means fertility, gold means holiness and greatness, red means courage, white means purity, and black means sincerity.
24	Coat of arms of North Kalimantan	Coat of arms of North Kalimantan	The emblem contain star represents the first principle of Pancasila: "Belief in One and Only God", traditional Dayak, Bulungan, and Tidung weapons like shield, mandau, and spear represents harmony between various culture and readiness to confront challenge from inside and outside, rice and cotton represents prosperity, the blue wave represent the potential resources from the sea and its shape represents the dynamics of society, 4 white waves represents the four major river (Kayan, Sesayap, Sembakung, and Sebuku) of the province that connects the people of the hinterland to the coast and border, the red and white gate represent North Kalimantan as the frontier of Indonesia as it is bordering the neighboring Malaysia, and the motto "Benuanta" means "Our land for us to develop to achieve prosperous society". In addition the color blue means beauty, peace, and prestige, green means fertility and growth, yellow means holiness and greatness, red means courage and strength, white means purity and honesty, and black means sincerity and protection.
25	Coat of arms of West Sulawesi	Coat of arms of West Sulawesi	The emblem is a white jars that contain various object, in the center is circling patterns called "Meander Kalumpang Tegak", there are 14 outer and inner patterns, it represents the 14 historical Mandar kingdom within West Sulawesi that kept being united until today, its colored gold to symbolize prosperity, tranquility, and holiness. Within the meander pattern is the geography and resources of the province represented by mountains, farmland, and sea. On the sea lies traditional Mandarese boat called Sandeq facing forward to symbolize the people that keep moving forward, the boat colored white to represents genuine heart to change for the better. On the sea is 5 white waves to symbolize the five regency that exist during the province formation. Jasmine and rice tied with red silk represents prosperity, purity, beauty, openness, fragrancy, and manners. Above the mountain is "Doe Pakka" or Trident with each prongs represents courage, sharp mind, and knowledge, the trident is straight to represents strength and honesty, and colored black to represents humility. Above the trident is umbrella to represents protection, and above it is a star to symbolize Pancasila and hopes. Lastly, the motto "Mellete Diatonganan" which means "Following the Truth" written on a red and white scroll that represents the country.
26	Emblem of South Sulawesi	Emblem of South Sulawesi	The emblem is a reminiscent of socialist heraldry design. It contains star represents the first principle of Pancasila: "The one and almighty God". 17 seeds of rice, 8 seeds of cotton with 5 points on the fruit and 4 points of its leaves to symbolize date of Indonesian independence on 17 August 1945. Badik, the traditional dagger, represents heroism and vigilancy to defend the country. The mountains, village, and rice fields symbolize prosperity and fertility. Below the badik is Fort Somba Opu viewed from above to represents defense against imperialism and neocolonialism, within the fort includes three emblems: A traditional pinisi boat representing the history of its people as seafarers that cross the ocean and symbolize persistence to continue the goals of Indonesian independence, the gear and hoe representing the province's industry and agriculture, and the coconuts represent the resources of the province. Lastly, the motto "Todo Puli" written in Lontara script means "Unshakable faith"
27	Emblem of Southeast Sulawesi	Emblem of Southeast Sulawesi	The emblem is pentagon-shaped to symbolize Indonesian ideology Pancasila. Inside the emblem is rice and cotton to represents prosperity, unbroken chain made out of 27 links to represents unity and its birth date on 27 April. Within the chain is a head of endemic animal called Anoa to represents tenacity and agility. And lastly, the color white represents purity and the other color represents all the regency that exist during the province formation: Yellow represents Muna Regency which is rich in teak, brown represents Kolaka Regency which is rich in nickel, black represents Buton Regency which is rich in asphalt, and green represent fertile land of Kendari Regency, now renamed Konawe Regency to prevent confusion with Kendari City.
28	Coat of arms of Central Sulawesi	Coat of arms of Central Sulawesi	The emblem are shaped like heart to symbolize the emblem meaning are derived from the heart of the people itself. The central part of the emblem is coconut tree which symbolize the resources because all parts of coconut tree are useful to human, it also represents sacrifice to achieve goals, tranquility, and persistence. The coconut tree has five leaves and five fruit to represent Pancasila, above it is a star to represents its first principle: "The One and Almighty God". Waves represent the maritime culture of the province. Rice and cotton represents prosperity, it also have numerical significance to represents the province's birth date on 13 April 1964. In addition, the color blue represents loyalty and hope, yellow represents wealth and glory, green represents fertility, brown represents tranquility, and red represents courage.
29	Coat of arms of Gorontalo	Coat of arms of Gorontalo	The emblem to some extent was inspired by its namesake capital Gorontalo City. The emblem is colored purple which is one of traditional color in Gorontalo. Within the emblem is five-pointed star that represents Pancasila and rice and cotton that represents prosperity. In the center is white maleo egg and wings, the endemic bird that can be found all over Sulawesi, it represents hope like a bird that soar in the sky. Within the egg are coconut trees that represents its economy, Otanaha Fortress and book represent traditional proverb: "Adat bersendikan sara', sara' bersendikan kitabullah", which means traditional laws are based on religious laws, and religious laws are based on the Quran. Below the egg is the name of the province on red scroll and chain to represents unity.
30	Emblem of North Sulawesi	Emblem of North Sulawesi	The emblem are pentagon shaped to symbolize Indonesia ideology Pancasila. Within the emblem are 45 seeds of rice on the left, 8 nutmegs and 17 cloves on the right, all of them symbolize the Indonesian Independence proclamation on 17 August 1945. In the center is 23 corn seeds encircling a coconut tree with 9 leaves, 6 roots, and 4 seeds just outside the corn circle, it represents the birth of the province on 23 September 1964. The corns, coconut, nutmegs, cloves, and rice all represents the resources of the province. In addition the various color on the emblem represents fertility, loyalty, glory, courage, persistence, and tranquility.
31	Coat of arms of Maluku	Coat of arms of Maluku	The emblem is called "SIWALIMA" just like its motto, it's the philosophy of the Moluccans to unite the different groups to achieve prosperity. Within the emblem is sago palm leaves, sago is the staple food of Moluccans, and coconut leaves both to represents resources and life. In the center are spear to symbolize heroism, pearl to represents marine resources. Mountain, nutmeg, and cloves to symbolize the land and forest resources, sea and boat to represents everlasting unity. There are 17 coconut leaflets, 8 pearls, and 45 sago leaves, all of them represents the Indonesian date of Independence on 17 August 1945.
32	Coat of arms of North Maluku	Coat of arms of North Maluku	The emblem consist of various objects, the palm leaves, cloves, and nutmeg represents prosperity. Star represents the first principle of Pancasila: The one almighty God. Mountain represents the land and its resources, sea and boats with radiant star represents unity. Traditional shield called Salawaku crossed with Parang blade represents heroism. The number 1999 represents the birth year of the province. And lastly, the motto: Marimoi Ngone Futuru which means United we stand.
33	Coat of Arms of Southwest Papua	Coat of arms of Southwest Papua	The emblem consists of shield, which represents the province as protector of the people. The white star represents the first principle of Pancasila: "The one and almighty God". Rice and cotton represents prosperity and welfare, and at the bottom end of them there is Kain Timor, a traditional cloth, which represents the unity of Doberai people. The chains represent unity, and the Cicinnurus respublica head on top of it symbolized the Provincial Government. The traditional stilt house symbolized the province capability to accommodate the people of Indonesia and abroad. The mountains, sea and island chains represents the ecological diversity of Southwest Papua, with the flaming oil and natural gas tower represents the natural resources of the province. The three stones symbolized the "Custom, Religion, and Government". The red-white ribbon represents the province as part of Indonesia, with the motto Bersatu Membangun Negeri on it means Unite to Build the Nation.
34	Coat of arms of West Papua	Coat of arms of West Papua	The emblem is a five-pointed blue shield to represents Pancasila with its five principles that will protect the people. Within the shield is a white star to represents first principle of Pancasila: The One and Almighty God. The shield is divided into three blue regions that symbolize the element of West Papua: Religion, Government, and People/Tradition, each of them work together to achieve common goals. The first region are depiction of gas flare found in oil plants to represents its mineral and petroleum resources, the second region depict a tree and a fish to symbolize the land and marine resources, the third region depict sago palm leaves with 12 leaflets on the right and 10 leaflets on the left, tied together with two karerin carvings of the Biak people both depicting number 9, it symbolizes the birth of the province on 12 October 1999. In the center of the shield is green circle with cassowary head to symbolize the province location as the "head and neck" part of the New Guinea island, it also represents courage, strength, persistence, and unity to achieve common goals. Lastly, the motto: Cintaku Negeriku is an Indonesian word which means My Love, My Country.
35	Coat of Arms of Central Papua	Coat of arms of Central Papua	The emblem consists of five pointed shield to symbolize Pancasila with the star itself represent the first principles which is belief in the one and only God. The emblem is surrounded by red and white border that symbolize the country. The blue and white mountain is Puncak Jaya that is famous for its snow-capped peak, it symbolize peace, strength, and resilience. The blue and green color on the shield respectively represent the sky and fertile soil. The ocean represent perseverance, patience, and loyalty. In the center is a noken or traditional woven bag and in the front of it are stone axe and sago harvester, both are important tools for locals and each symbolize principle and authority. 25 rice and 7 cotton represents 25 July as the anniversary date of this province. The motto Gerbang Cenderawasih literally means "Gateway of Bird-of-paradise", the bird-of-paradise are endemic bird in the Papua island. The motto is actually a backronym for Gerakan Pembangunan yang Cepat, Nasionalis, Damai, Sejahtera, Wibawa dan Kasih which means "Action for Development, that are Rapid, Nationalist, Peaceful, Prosperous, Authoritative and Loving". This motto represents a guiding principle for the civil service in the Central Papua government to provide effective service to the people of the region while upholding the values.
36	Coat of arms of South Papua	Coat of arms of South Papua	The five-pointed shield represents the spirit of the people in protecting the country. The yellow star symbolizes the first principle of Pancasila: "Belief in the One and Only God," as well as promoting religious tolerance. The four arrows represent the original regencies that formed this province. The red and white spearhead pointing upwards symbolizes courage and swift action in all aspects of defense, reflecting its status as the easternmost border of Indonesia. The diamond represents the power and love of the people, as well as the beauty of the land and its potential. The 30 grains of rice and six cotton balls symbolize the birth date of this province, June 30. The rice, cotton, and sago leaves signify prosperity. The traditional Papuan musical instrument, the tifa, symbolizes community togetherness in building South Papua. The four tree roots at the bottom, patterned like a river, represent the river as an important transportation method for the province, connecting the hinterland with the coast. The motto Maju Negeriku means "Onward my Country".
37	Coat of arms of Highland Papua	Coat of arms of Highland Papua	The emblem is five-pointed shield to represents defense and the Indonesian ideology Pancasila. The mountains and valleys represent the abundant natural resources of the Lapago customary region within the province, while the rivers symbolize the fertile soil in the province. The watchtower, which customarily was used to scout for enemies during a tribal war, stands for the hope that the region will give birth to leaders who have a great vision and mission for the province's better future. Honai traditional house represent the tribes of Highland Papua. It also stands for being of one heart and one mind in solving various problems. The noken bag symbolize women's role in developing the province. The 25 wheat grains, 7 cottons and year "2022" represent the establishment of the province on 25 July 2022. The 8 red-white ribbons represent the eight regencies of the province within the frame of Republic of Indonesia. The motto Bangkit Bersama Membangun means Rise Together to Develop.
38	Coat of arms of Papua	Coat of arms of Papua	The emblem is five-pointed shield to represents defense and the Indonesian ideology Pancasila. The base colour of this emblem is gold represents glory and wealth of the land, blue represents marine resources, and the yellow border represents confidence to achieve all goals. In the center of the emblem is three monuments that stands on 6 upper foundation and 9 lower foundation, it represents the success of Operation Trikora and "PEPERA" or Act of Free Choice to unite Western New Guinea with Indonesia in 1969, the color white and black represents peace and purity. 17 seeds of rice and 8 cottons tied by red ribbon knots with 4 loops and 5 ends symbolize unity of the nations and country with the spirit of Proclamation of Indonesian Independence on 17 August 1945 to achieve just and prosperous society. Three mountains on the background represents the geography of the province, the colour green represents fertility of the Papuan island. Lastly, the motto Karya Swadaya means Work with one's own might.

== Regencies and cities ==
=== Aceh ===
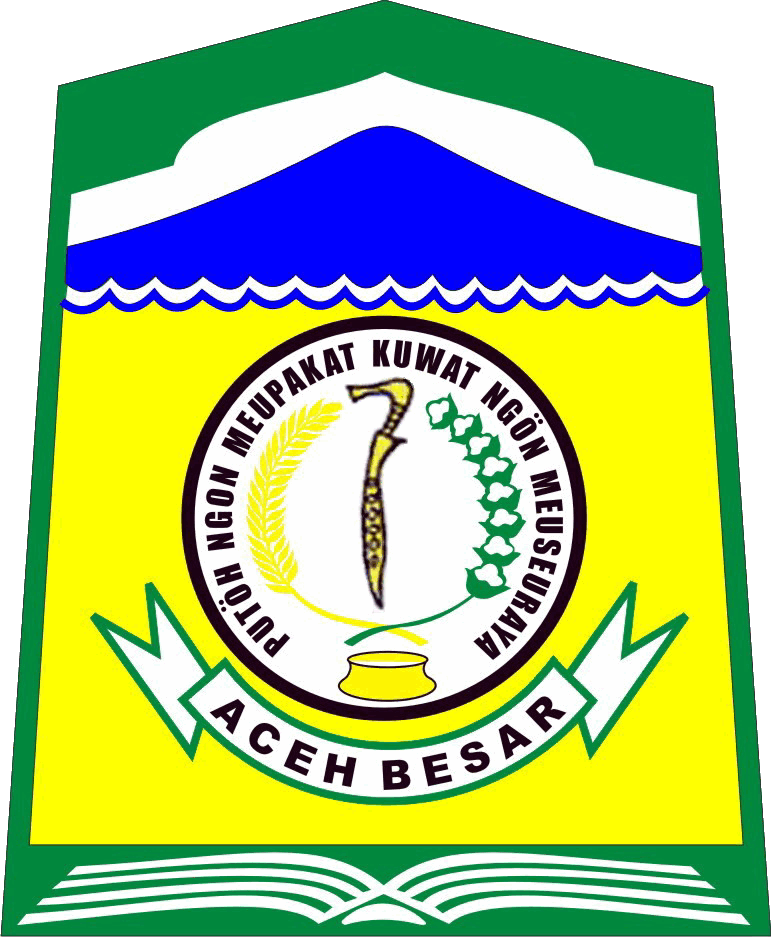
Aceh Besar Regency

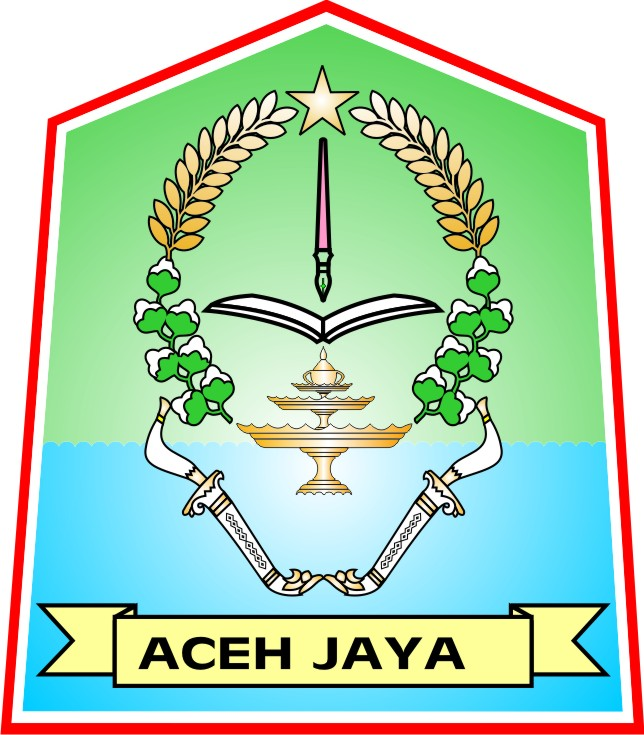
Aceh Jaya Regency

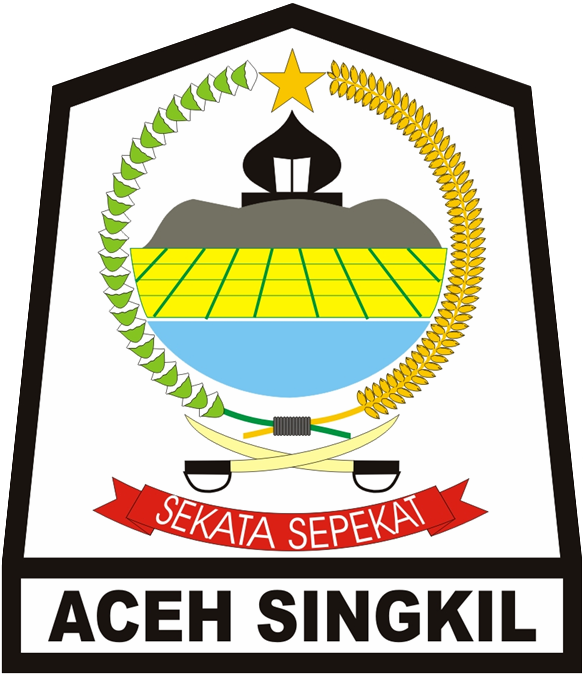
Aceh Singkil Regency

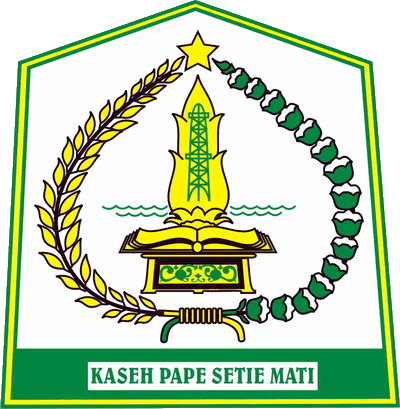
Aceh Tamiang Regency

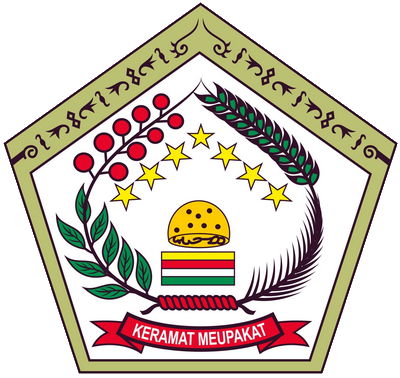
Central Aceh Regency

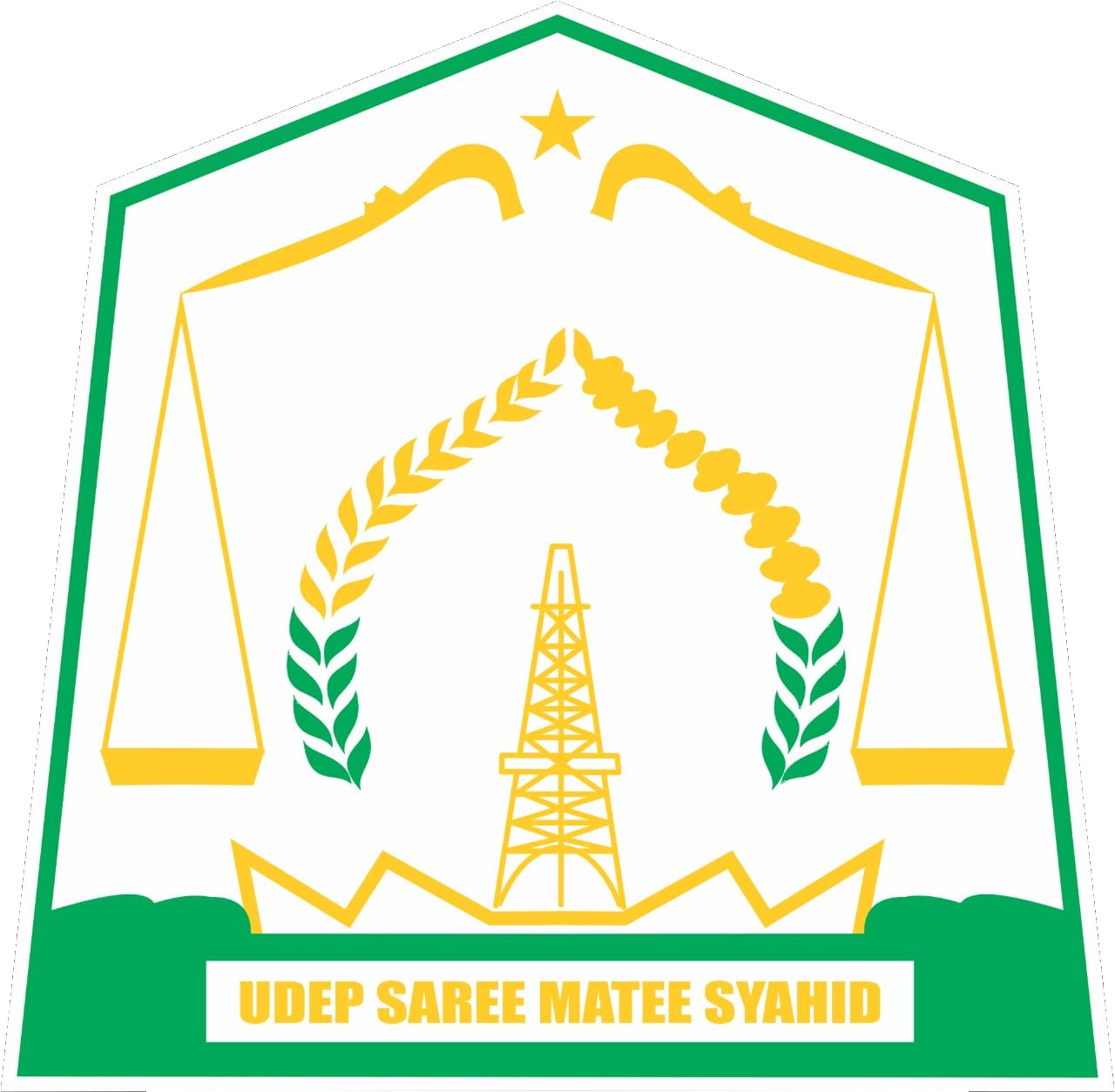
East Aceh Regency

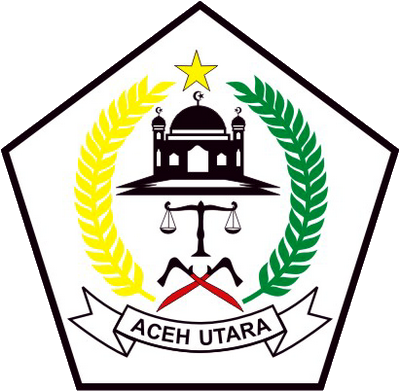
North Aceh Regency

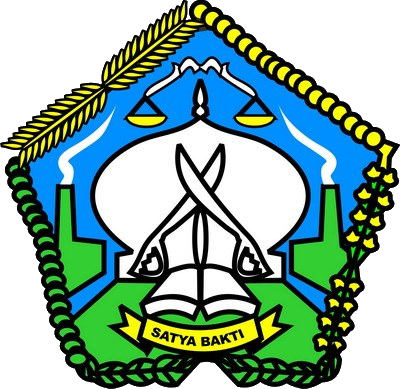
South Aceh Regency

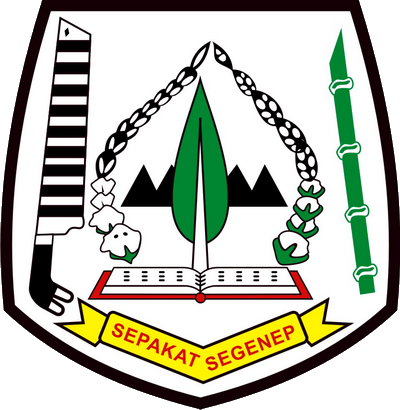
Southeast Aceh Regency

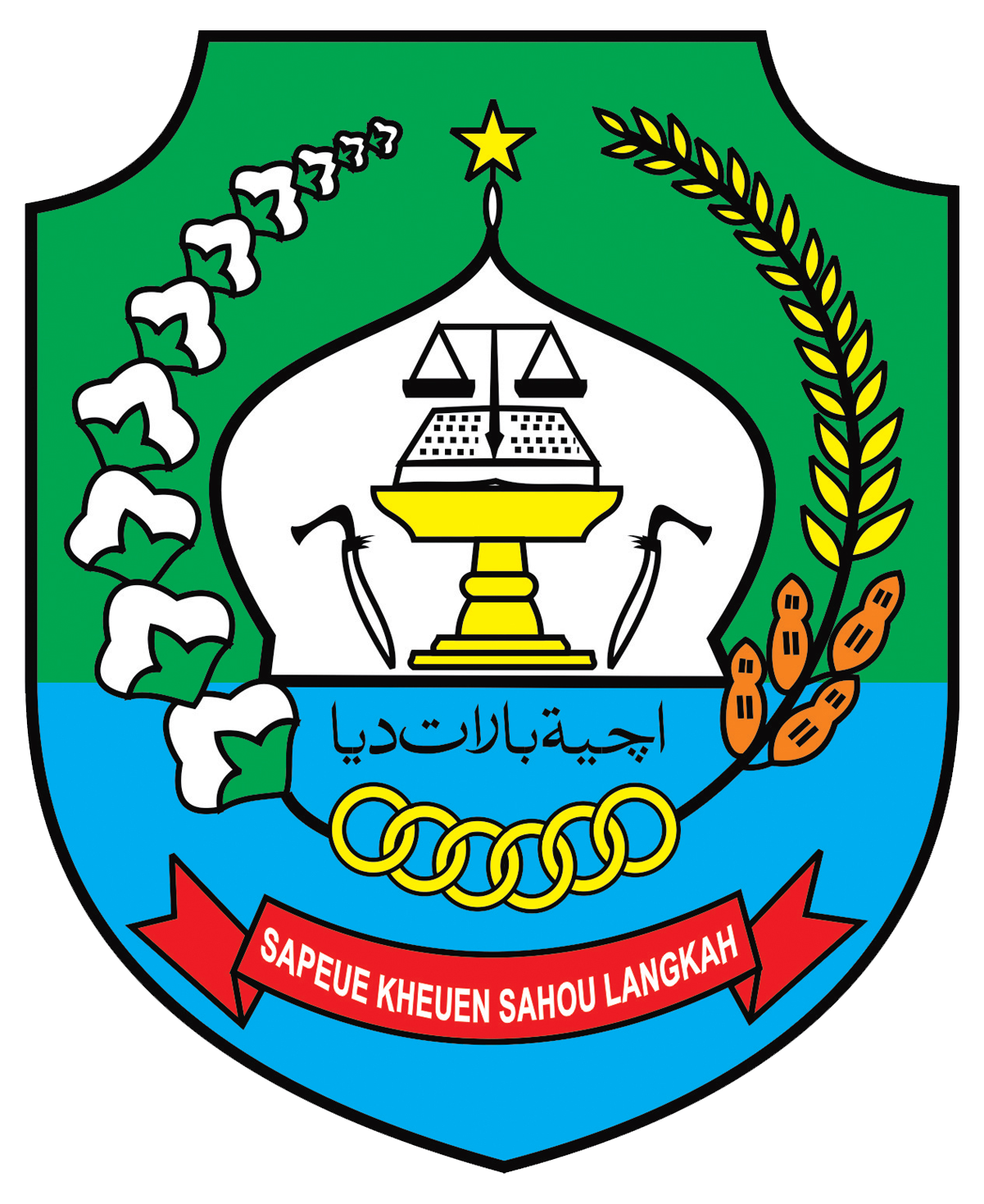
Southwest Aceh Regency

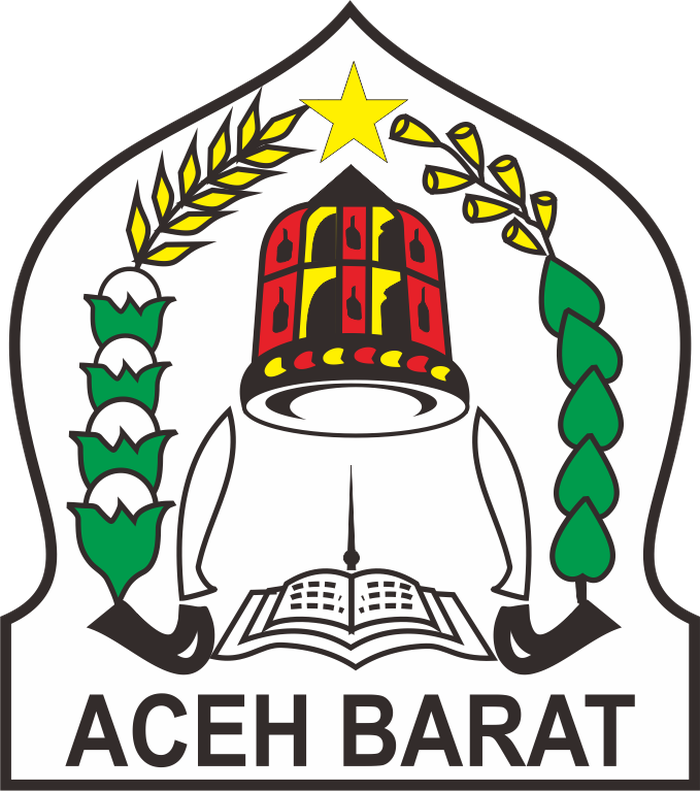
West Aceh Regency

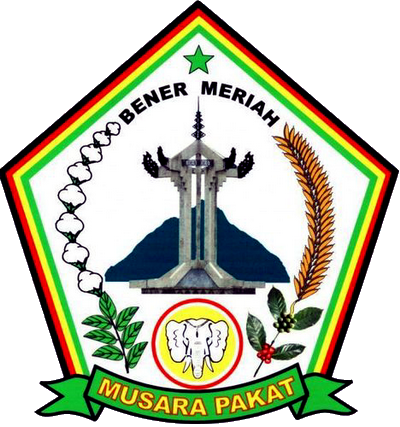
Bener Meriah Regency

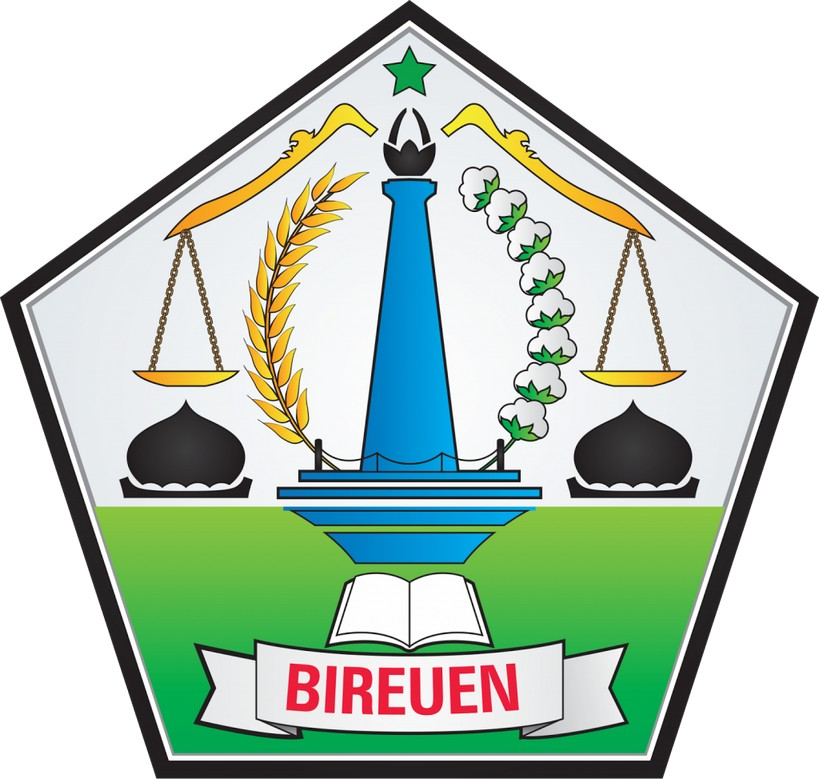
Bireuen Regency

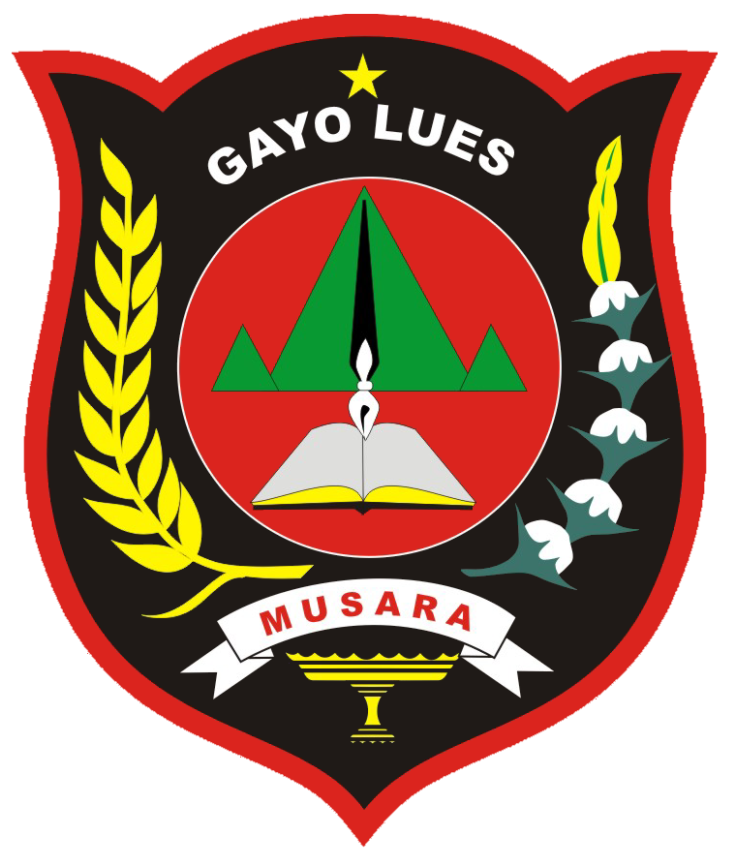
Gayo Lues Regency

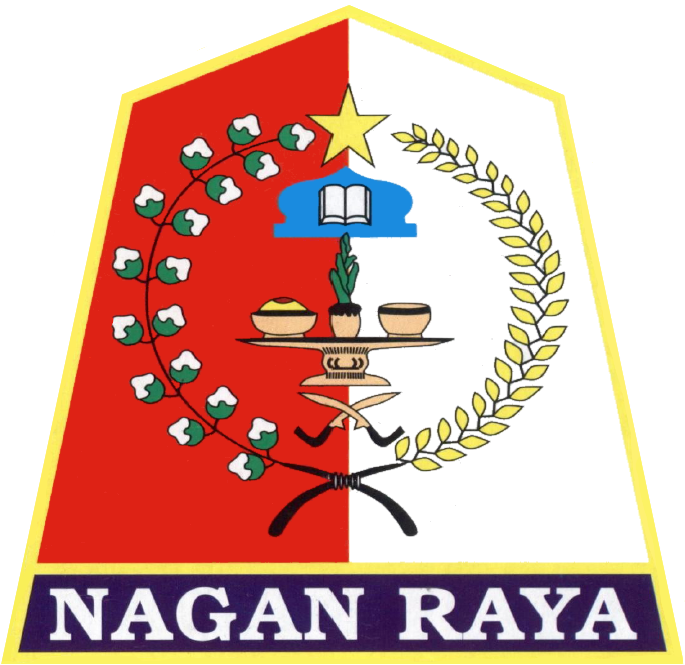
Nagan Raya Regency

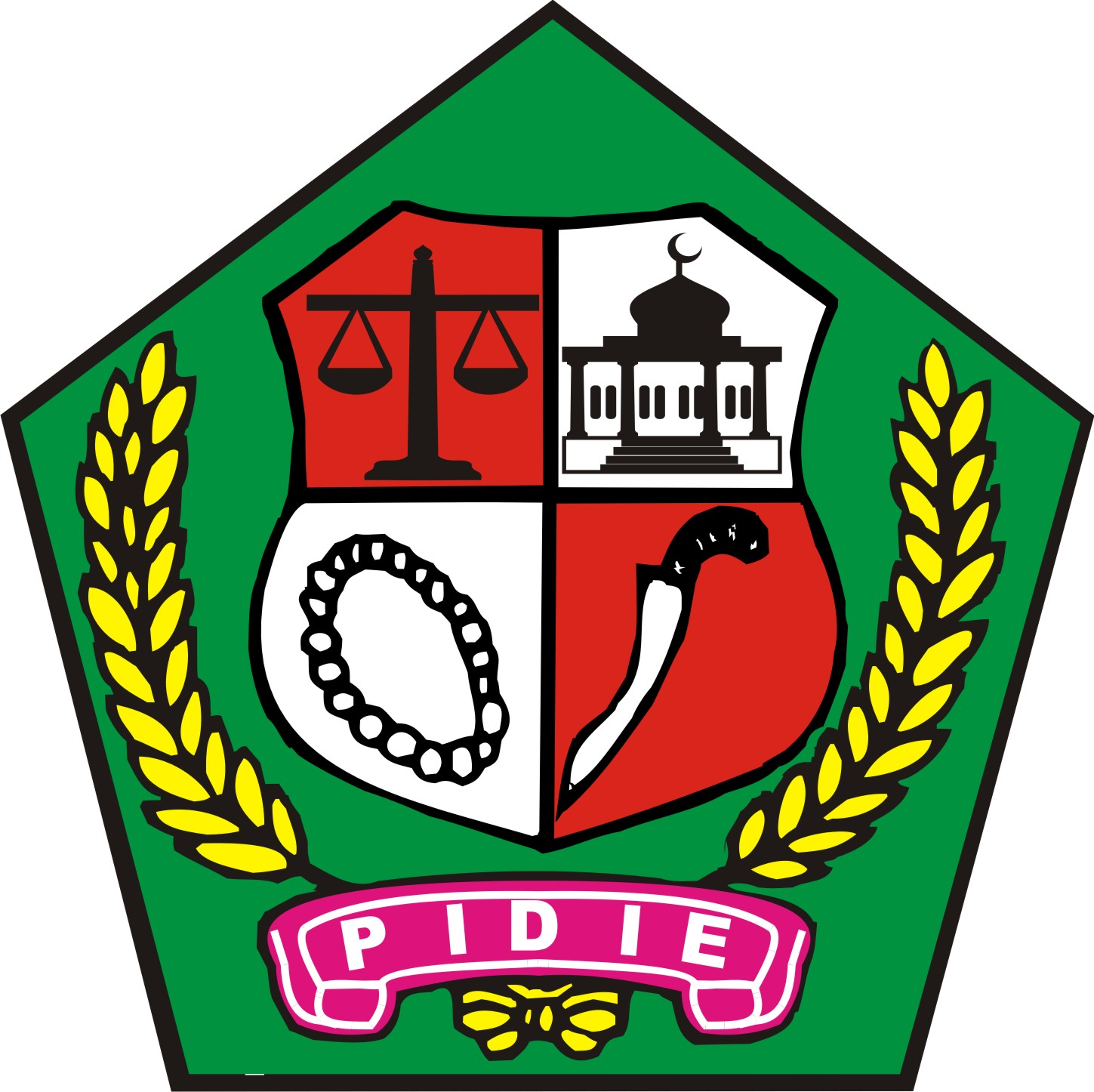
Pidie Regency

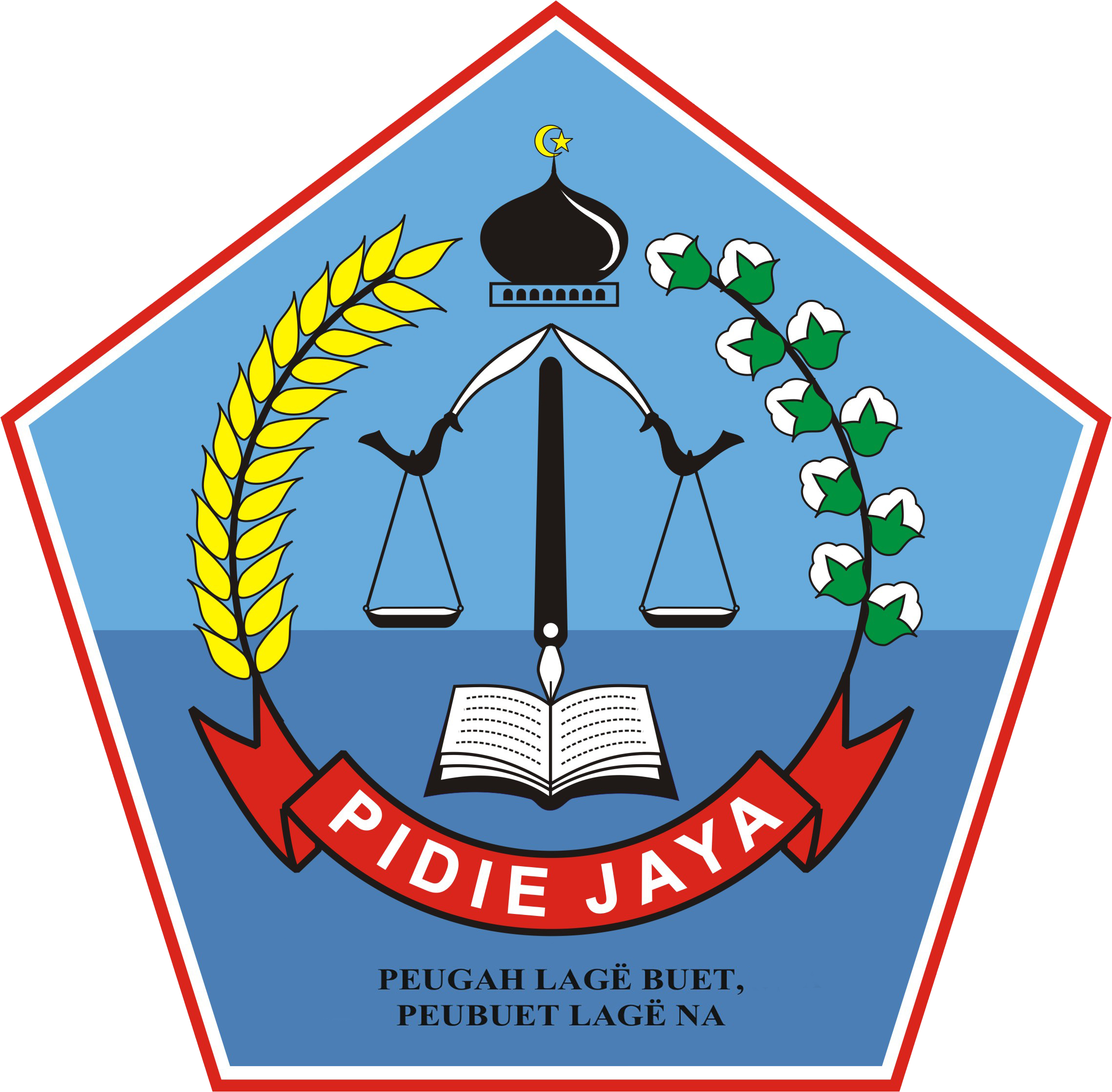
Pidie Jaya Regency

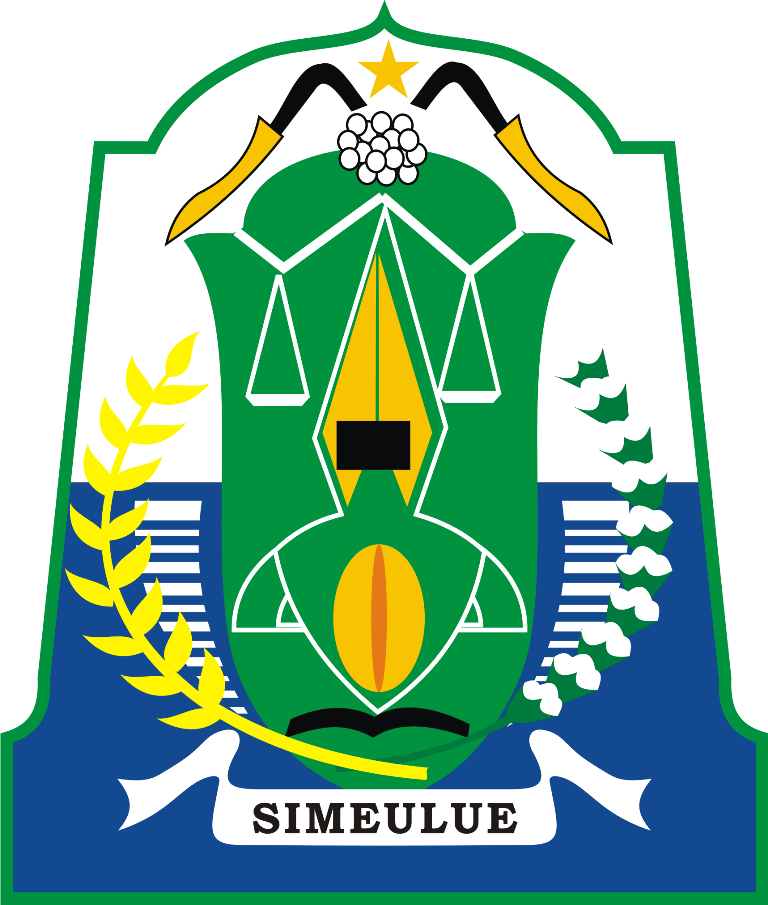
Simeulue Regency

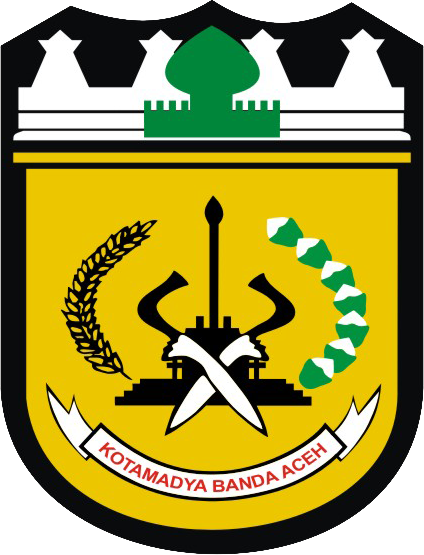
Banda Aceh City

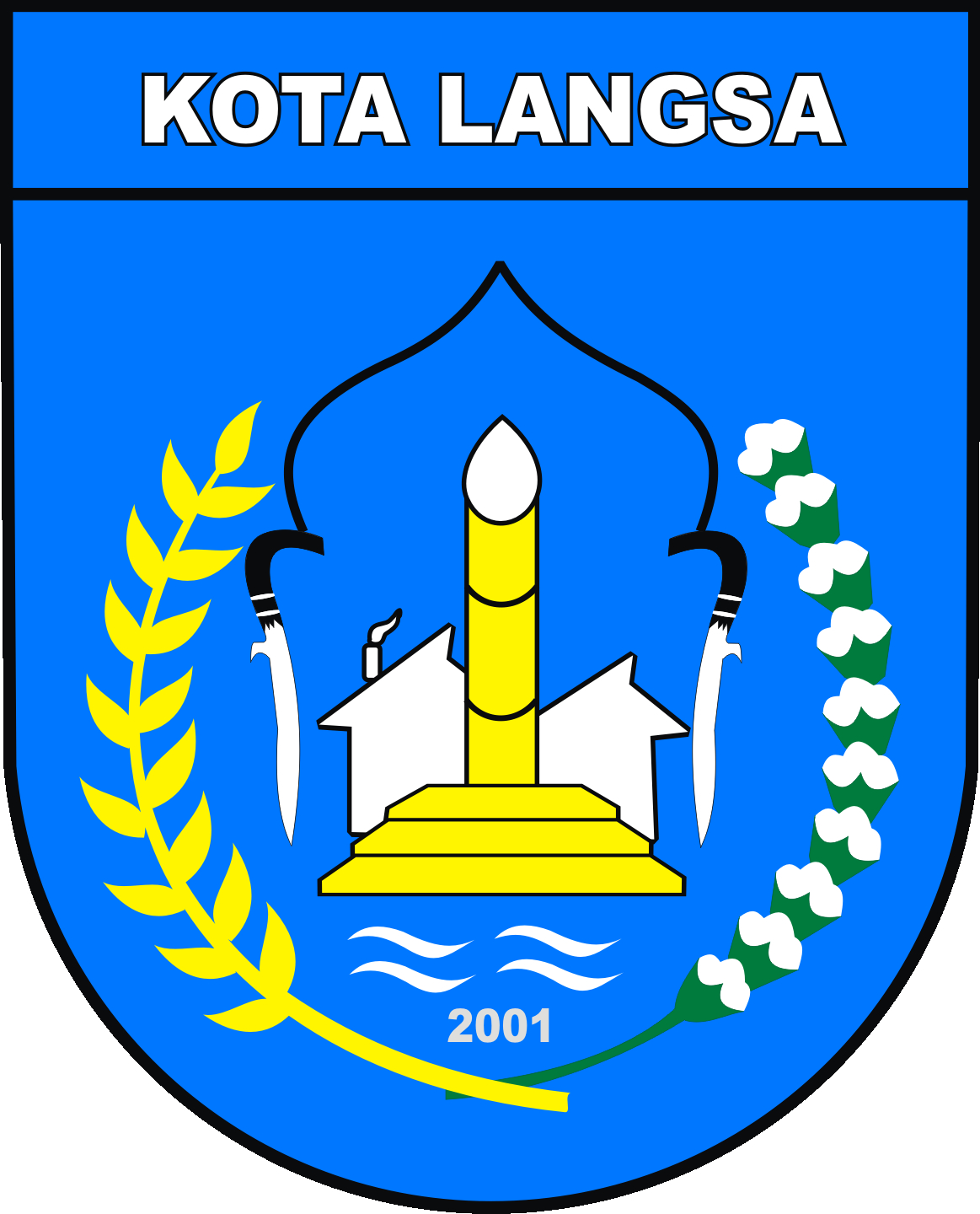
Langsa City

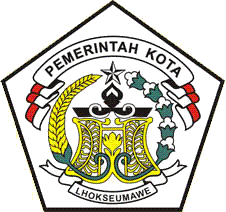
Lhokseumawe City

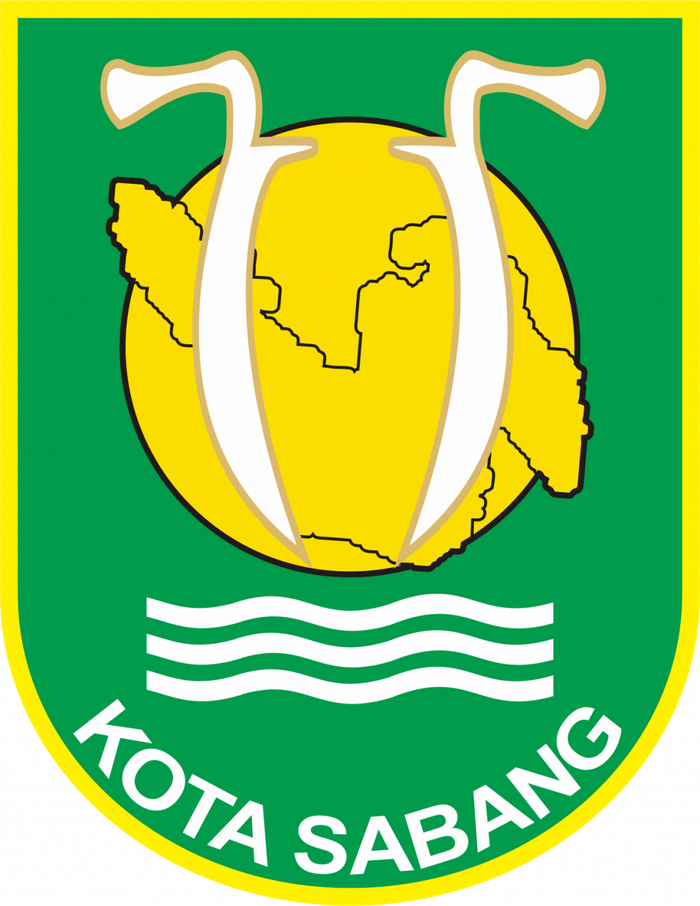
Sabang City

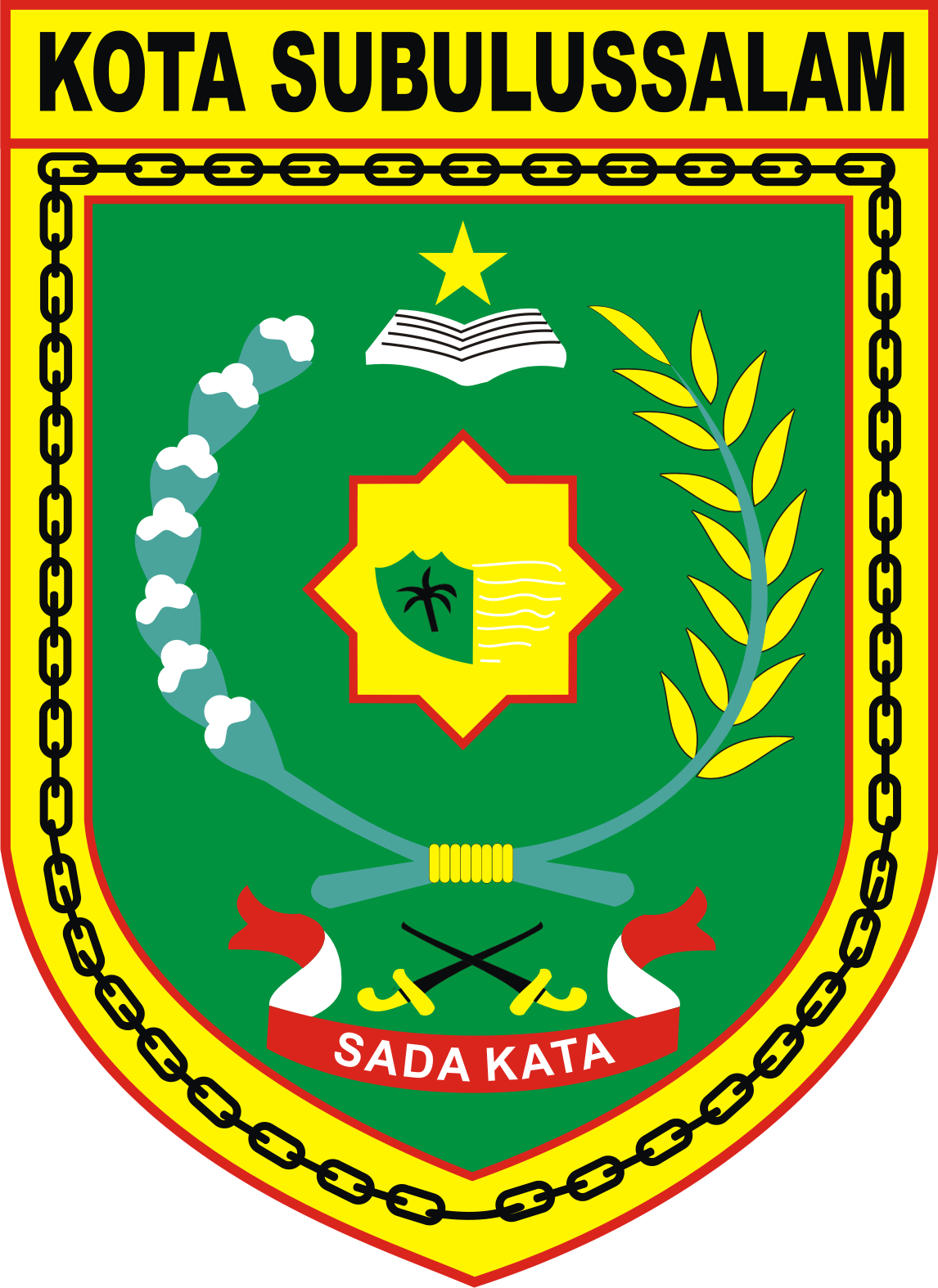
Subulussalam City

=== North Sumatra ===
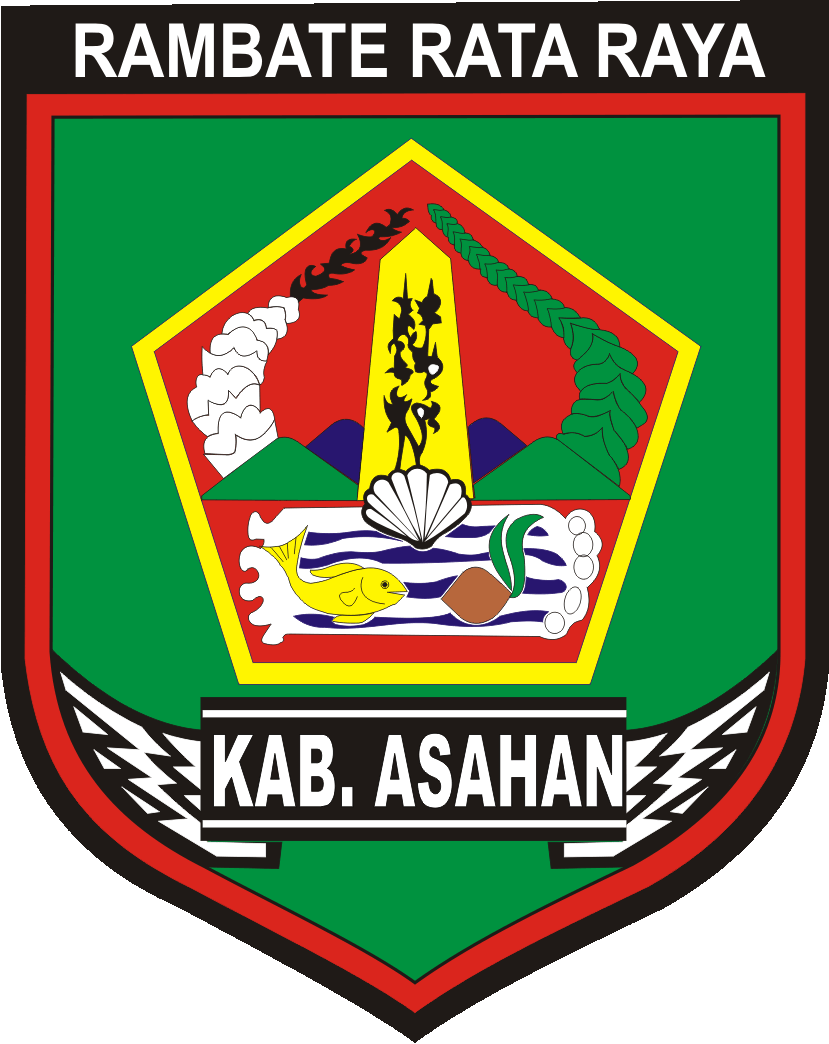
Asahan Regency

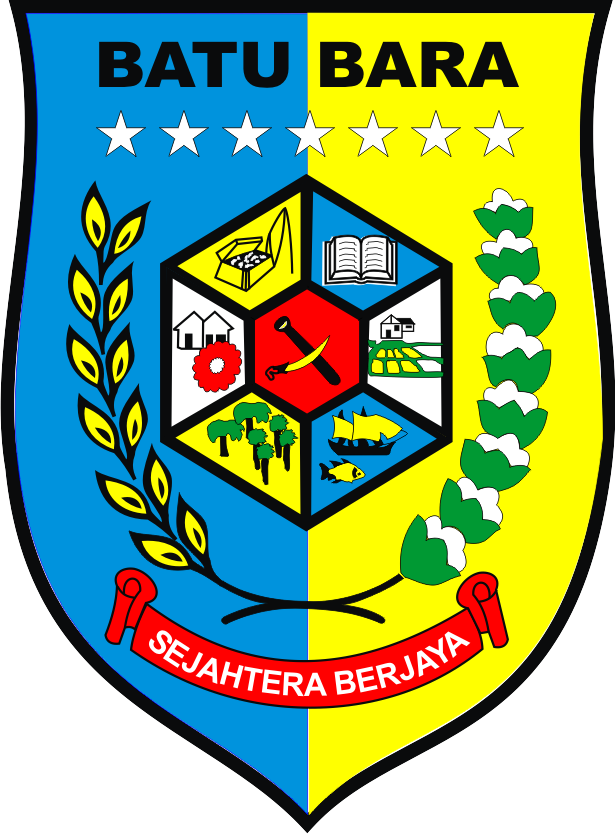
Batubara Regency

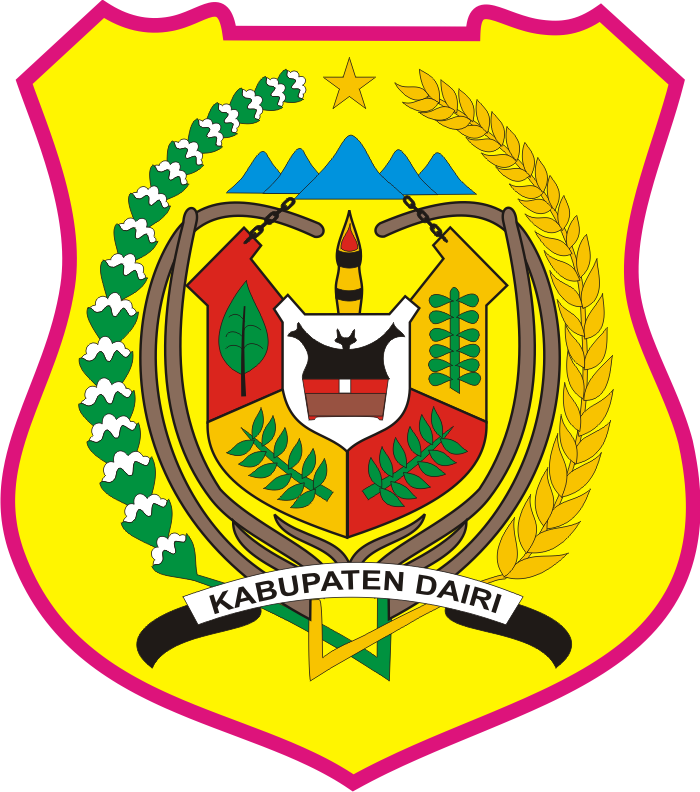
Dairi Regency

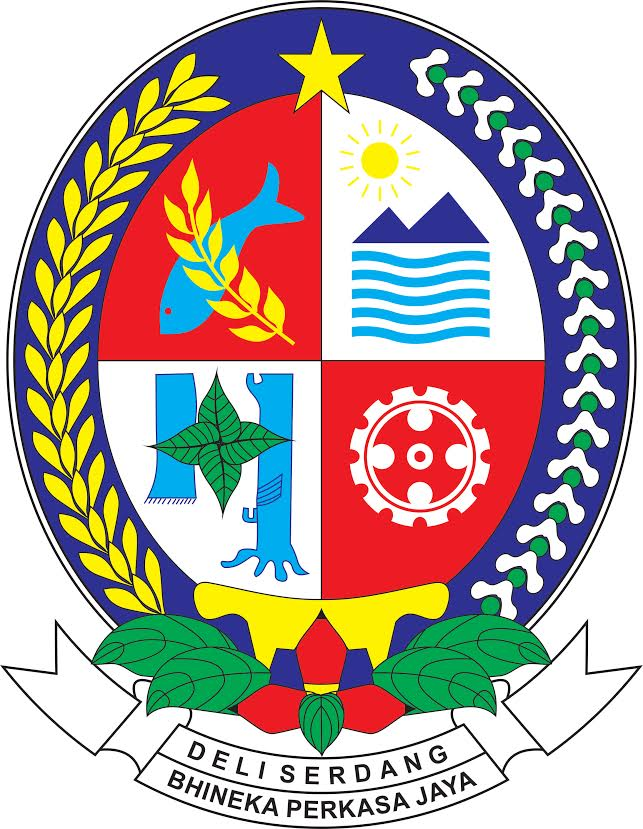
Deli Serdang Regency

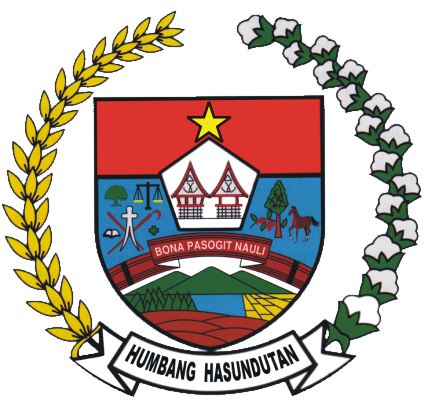
Humbang Hasundutan Regency

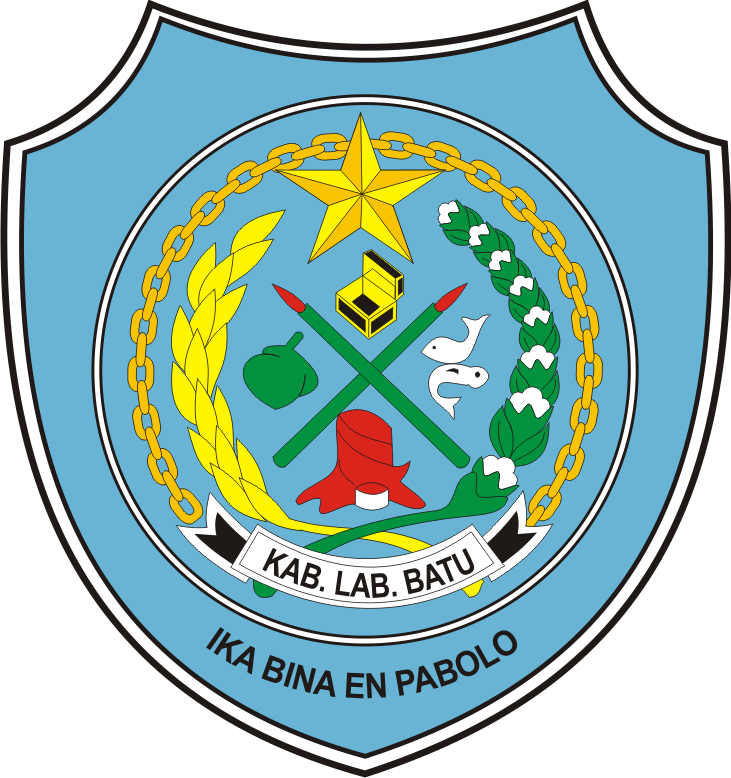
Labuhanbatu Regency

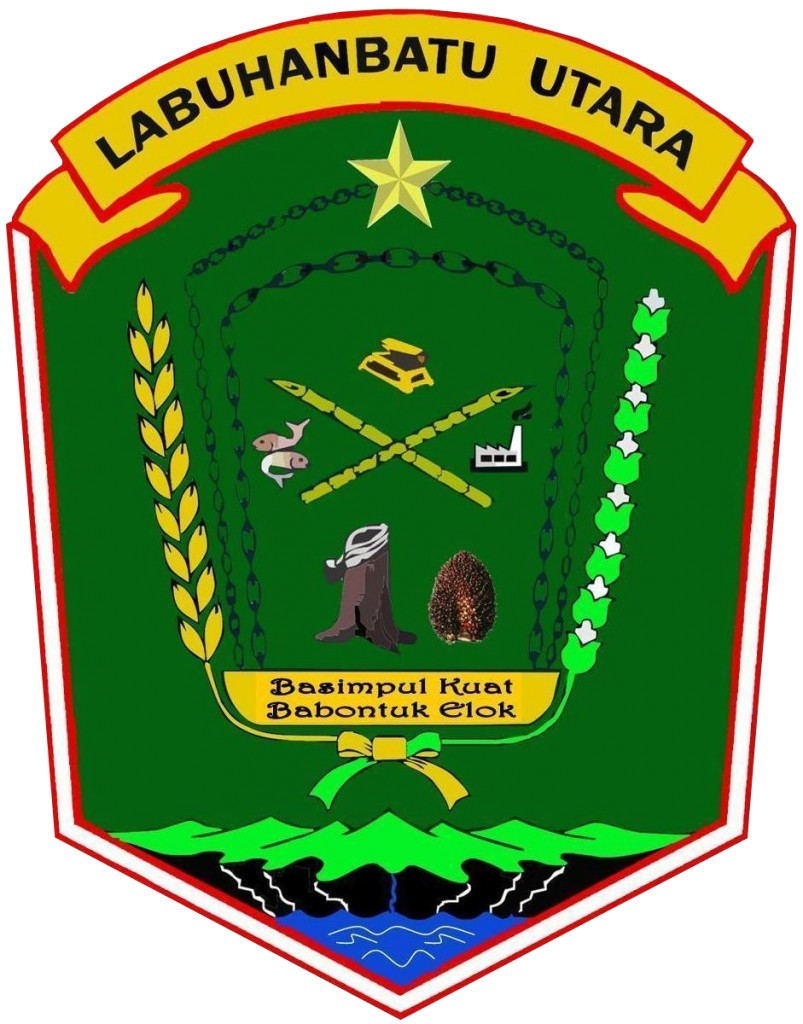
North Labuhanbatu Regency

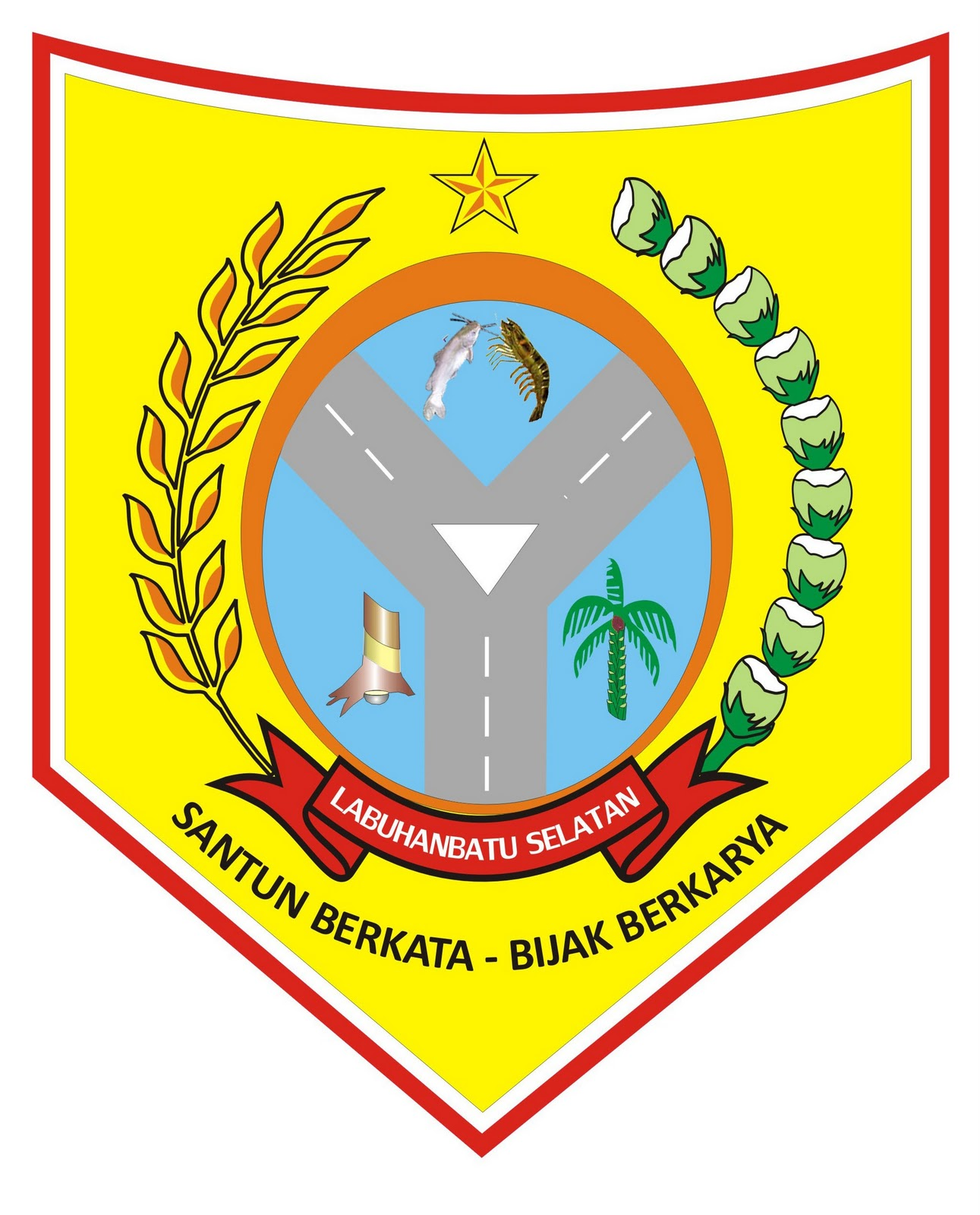
South Labuhanbatu Regency

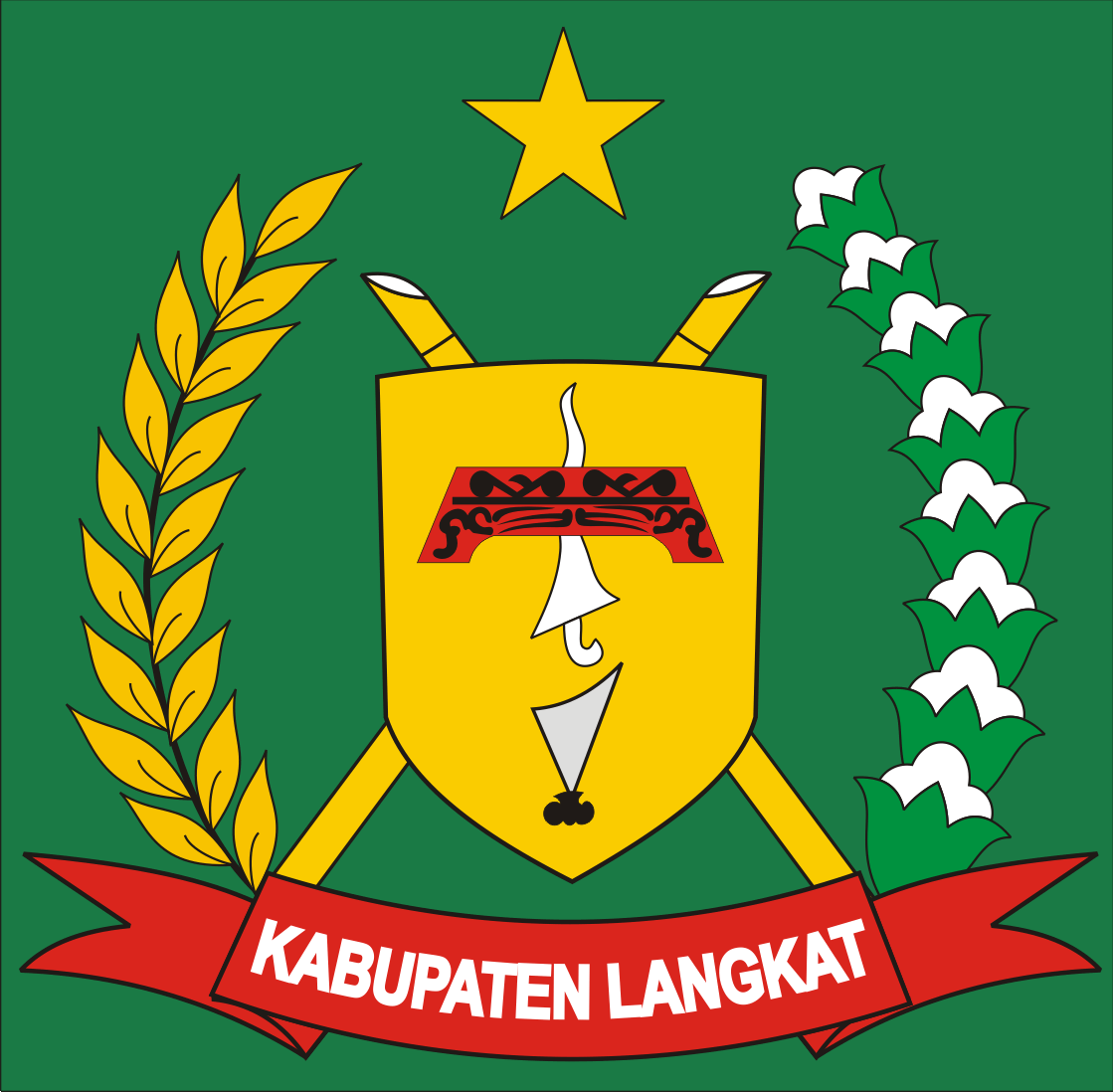
Langkat Regency

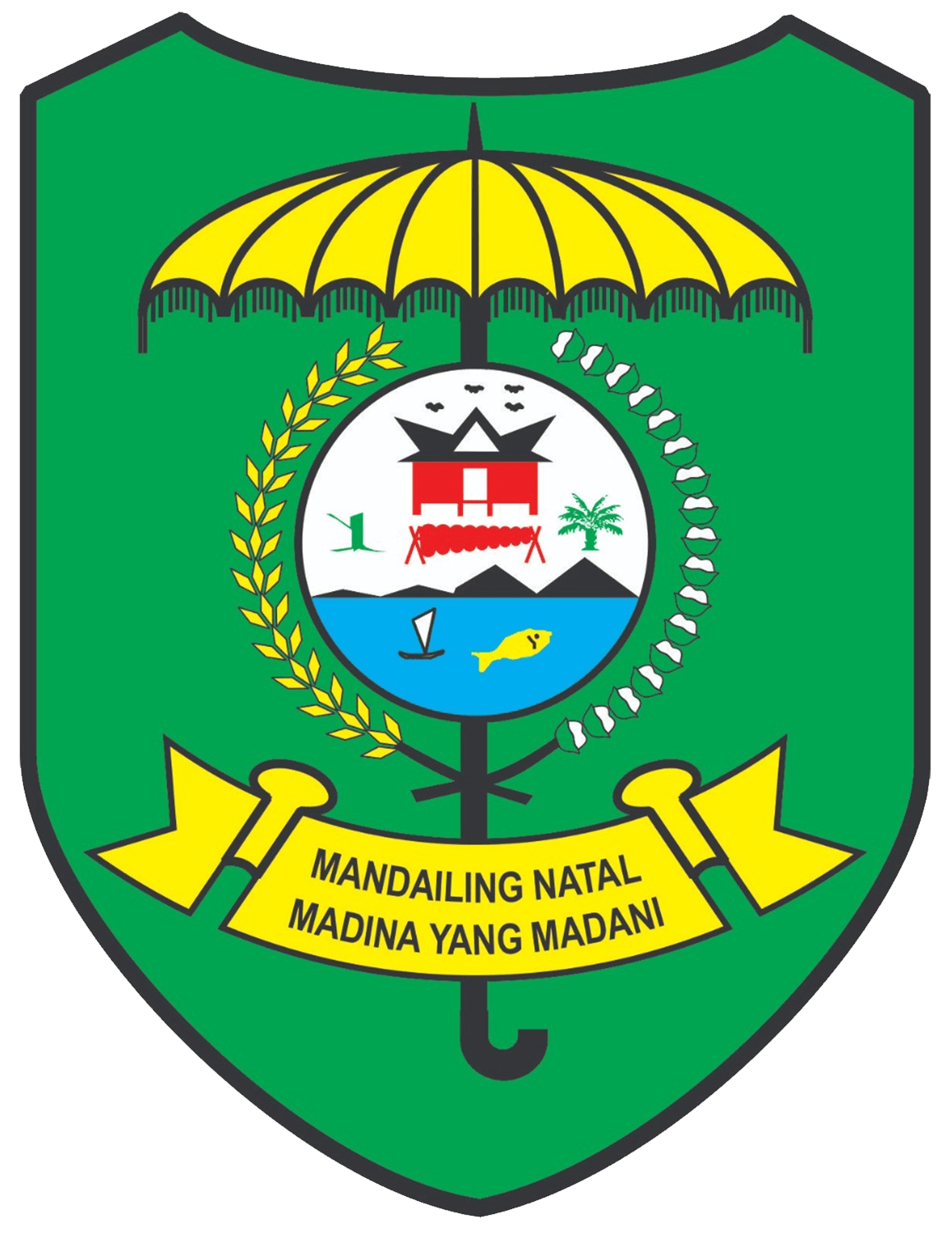
Mandailing Natal Regency

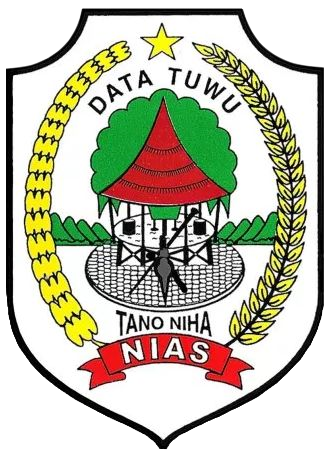
Nias Regency

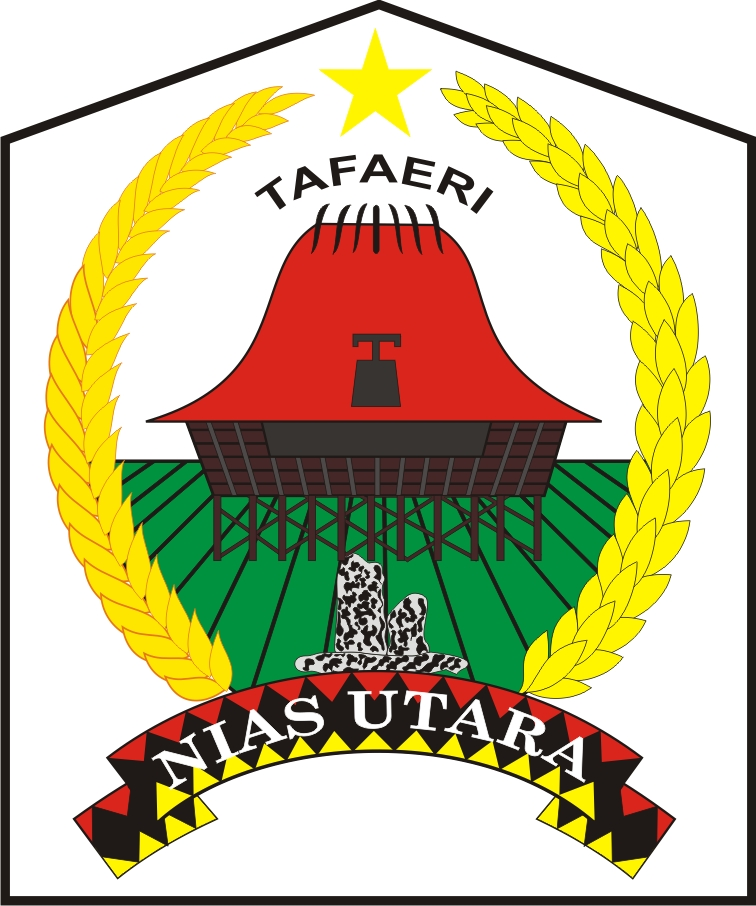
North Nias Regency

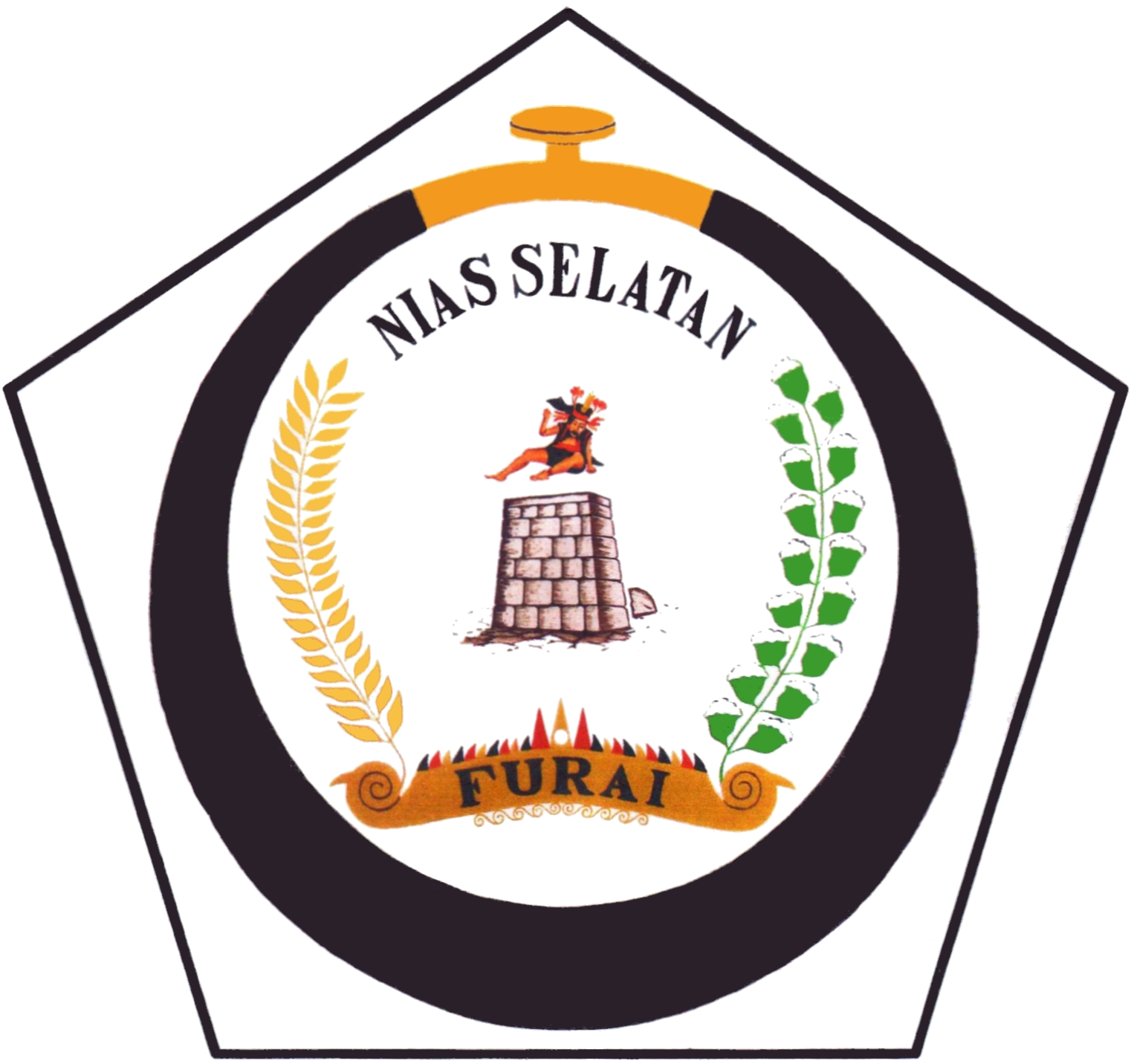
South Nias Regency

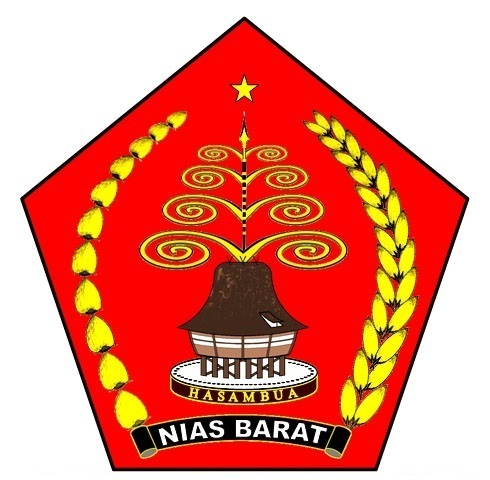
West Nias Regency

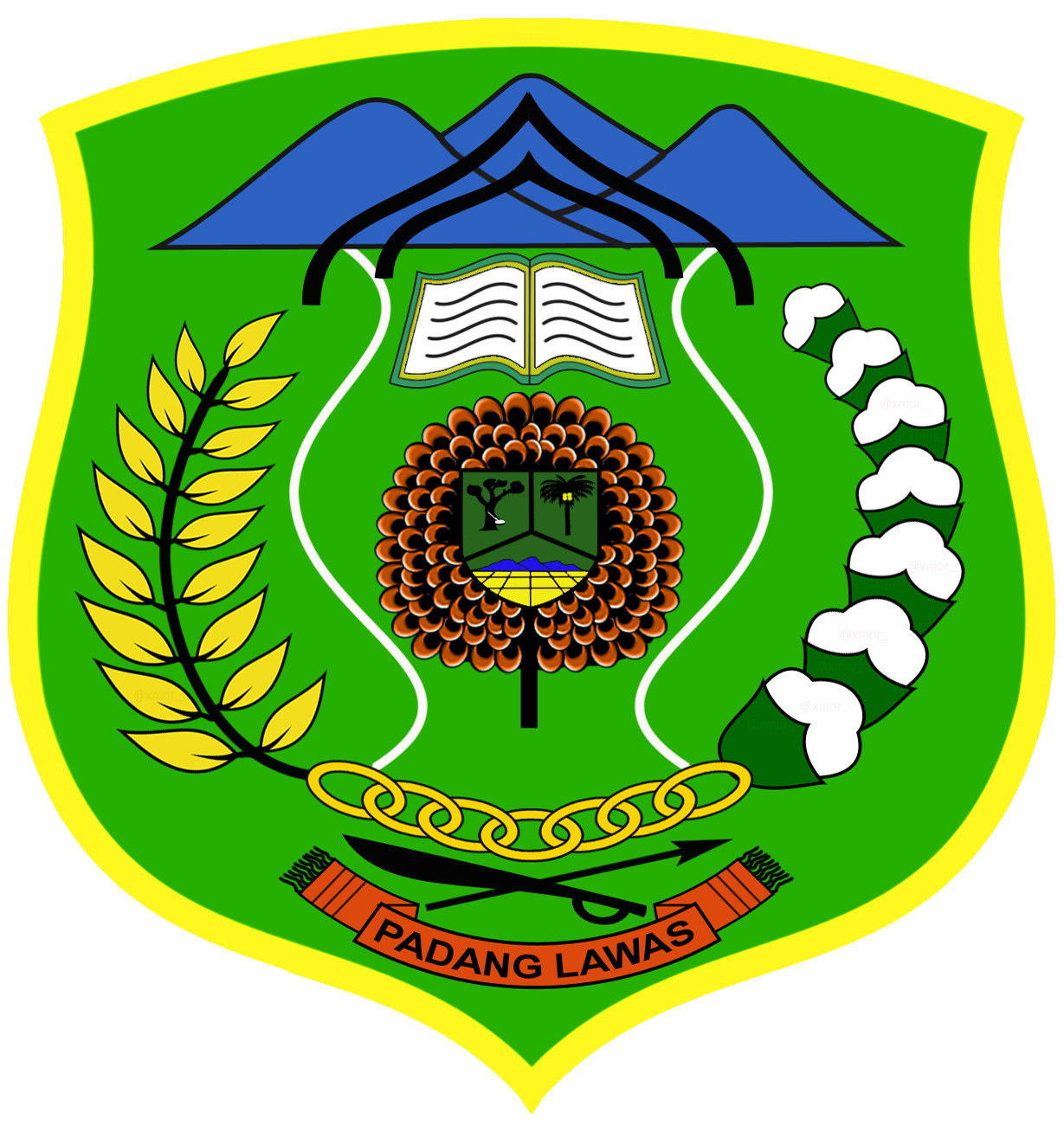
Padang Lawas Regency

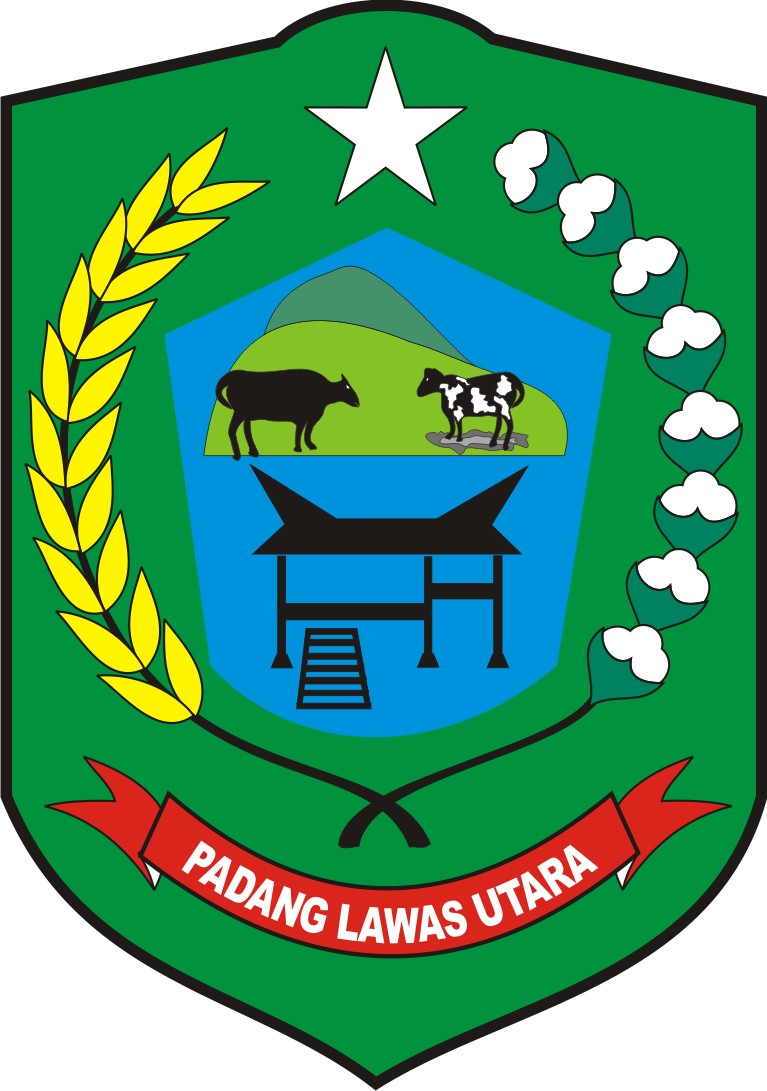
North Padang Lawas Regency

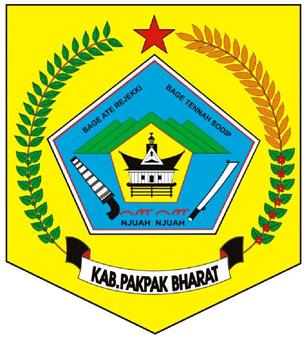
Pakpak Bharat Regency

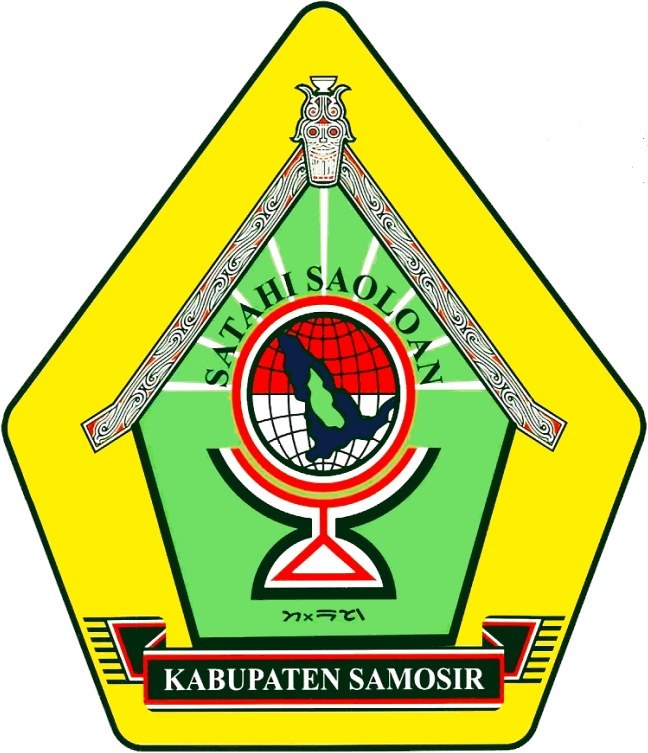
Samosir Regency

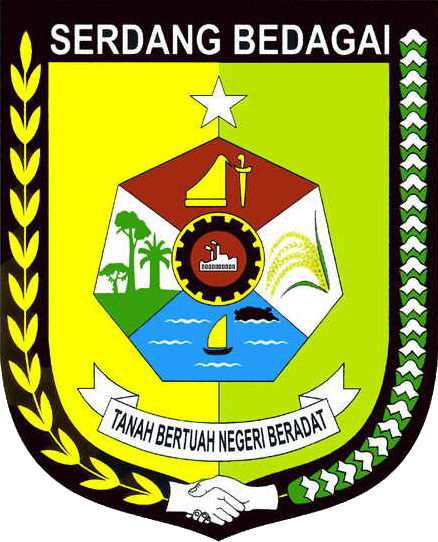
Serdang Bedagai Regency

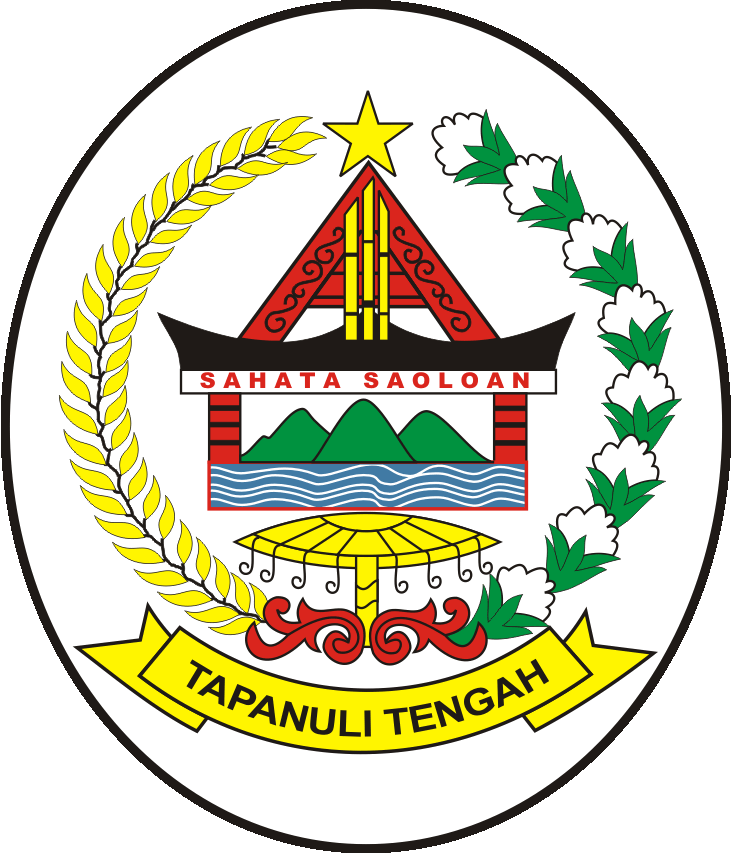
Central Tapanuli Regency

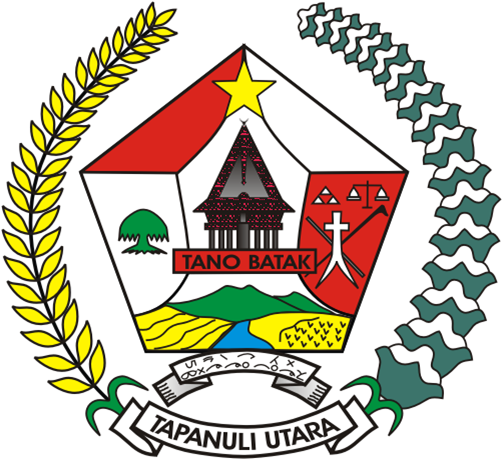
North Tapanuli Regency

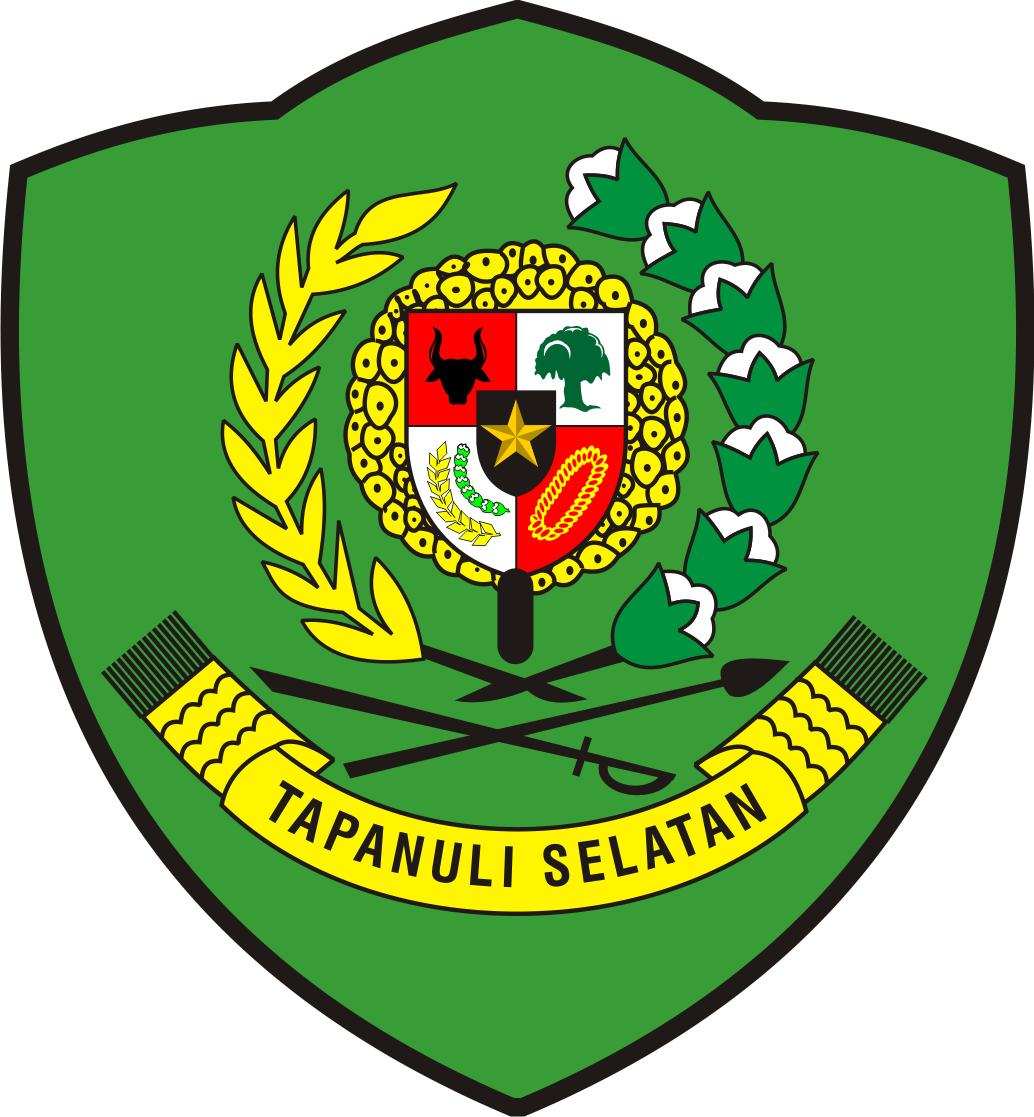
South Tapanuli Regency

Toba Regency

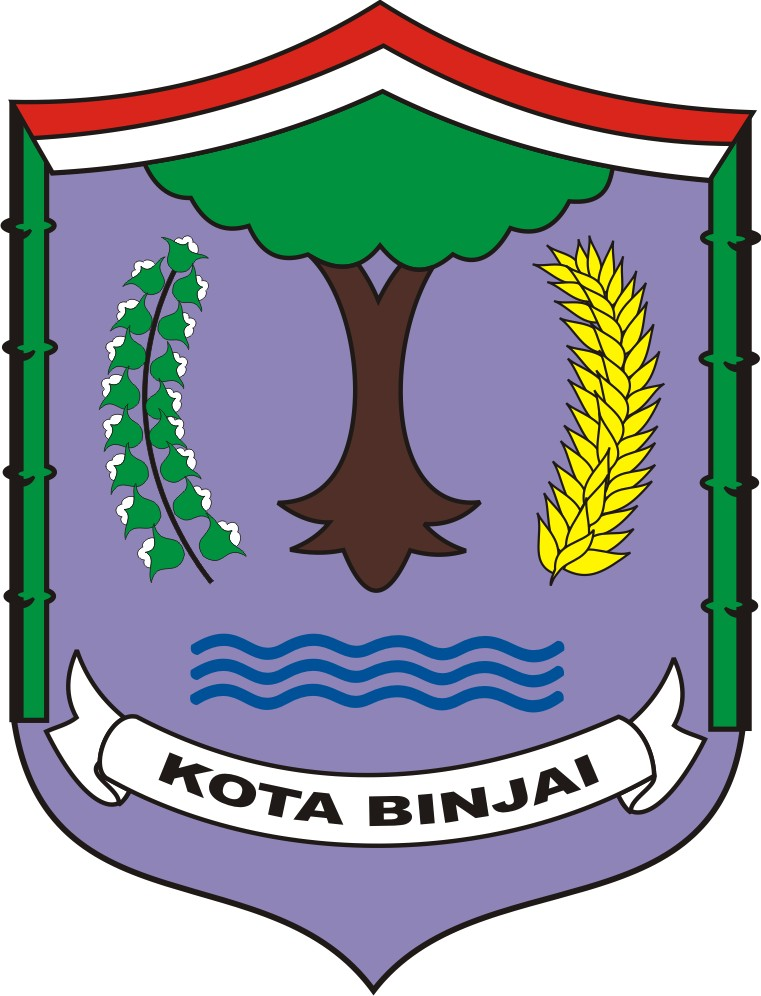
Binjai City

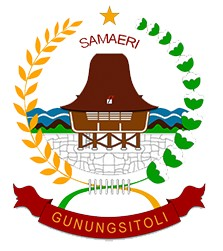
Gunungsitoli City

Medan City

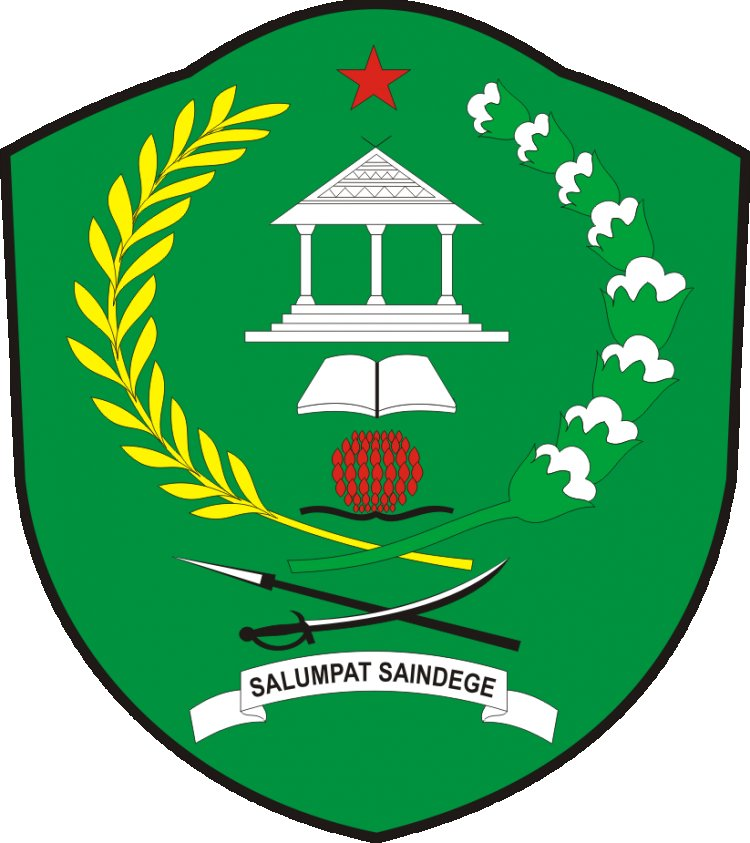
Padangsidempuan City

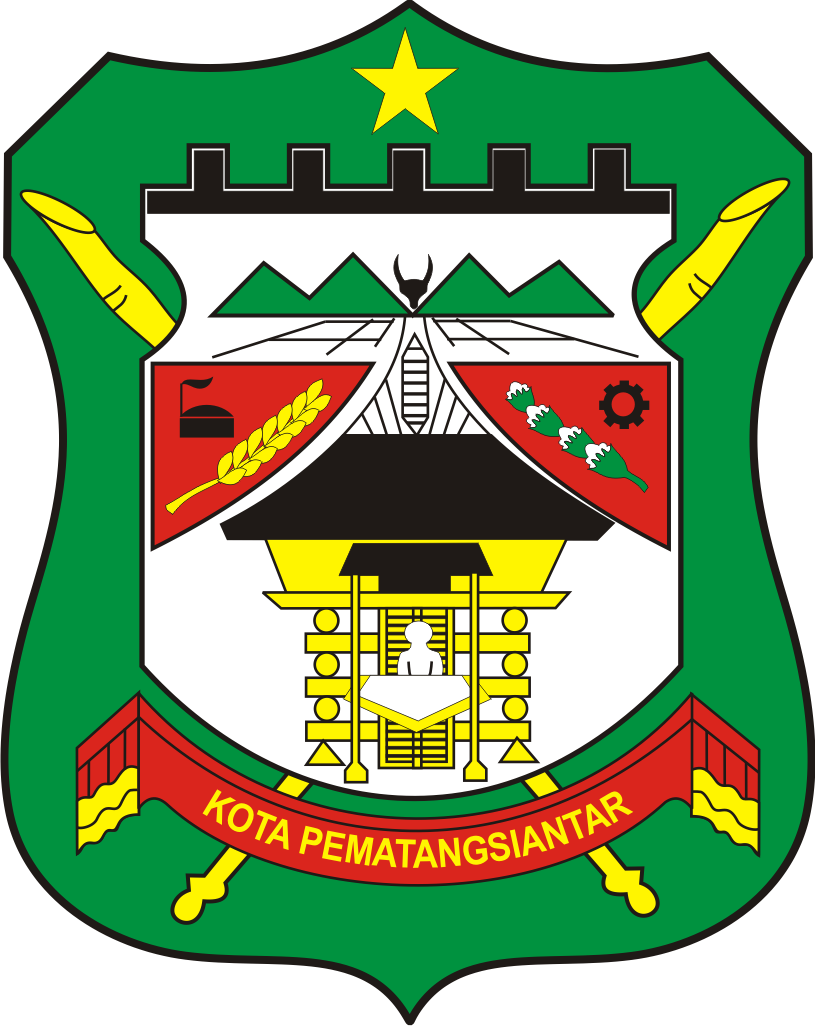
Pematangsiantar City

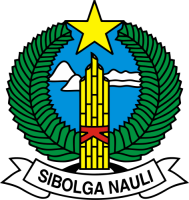
Sibolga City

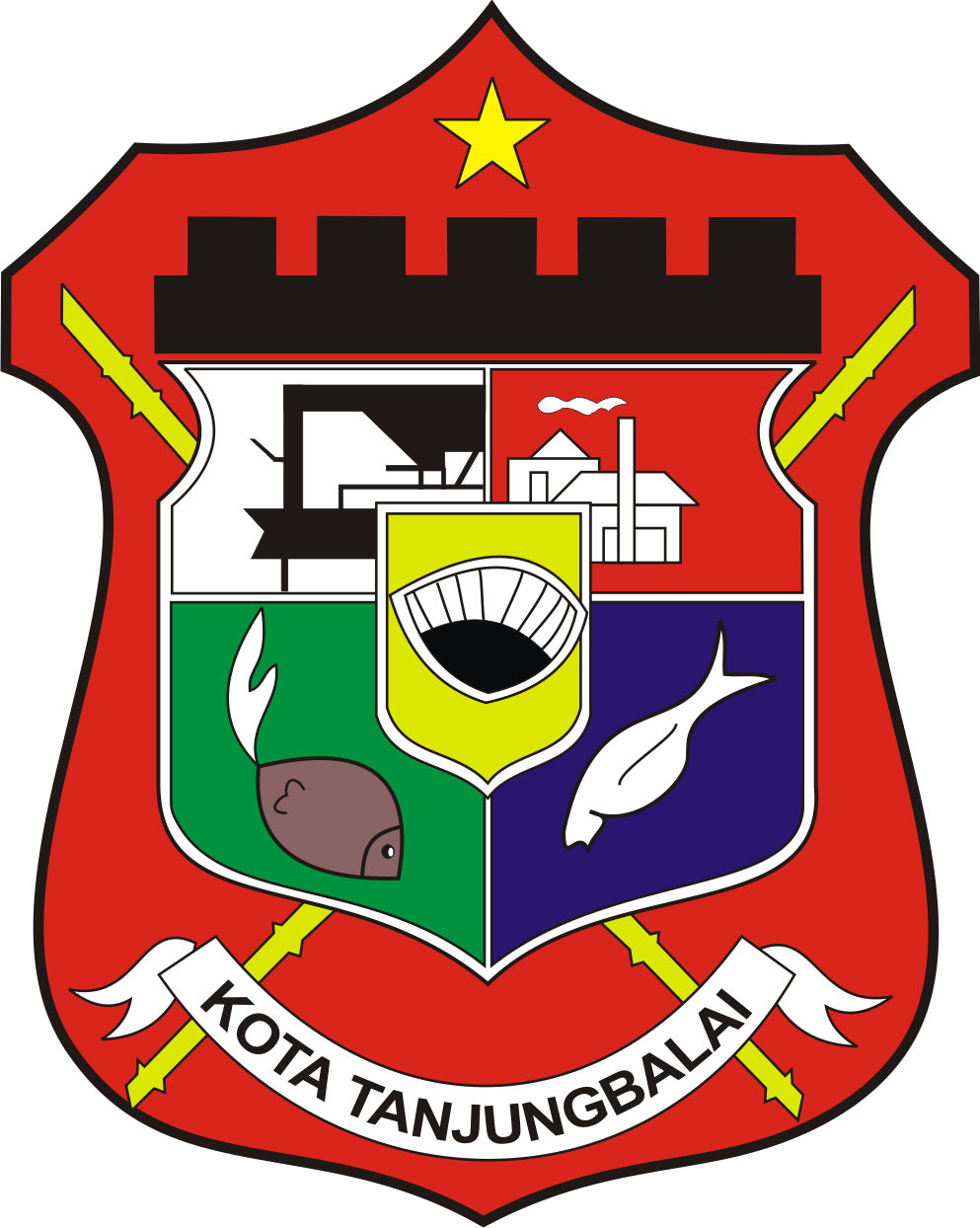
Tanjungbalai City

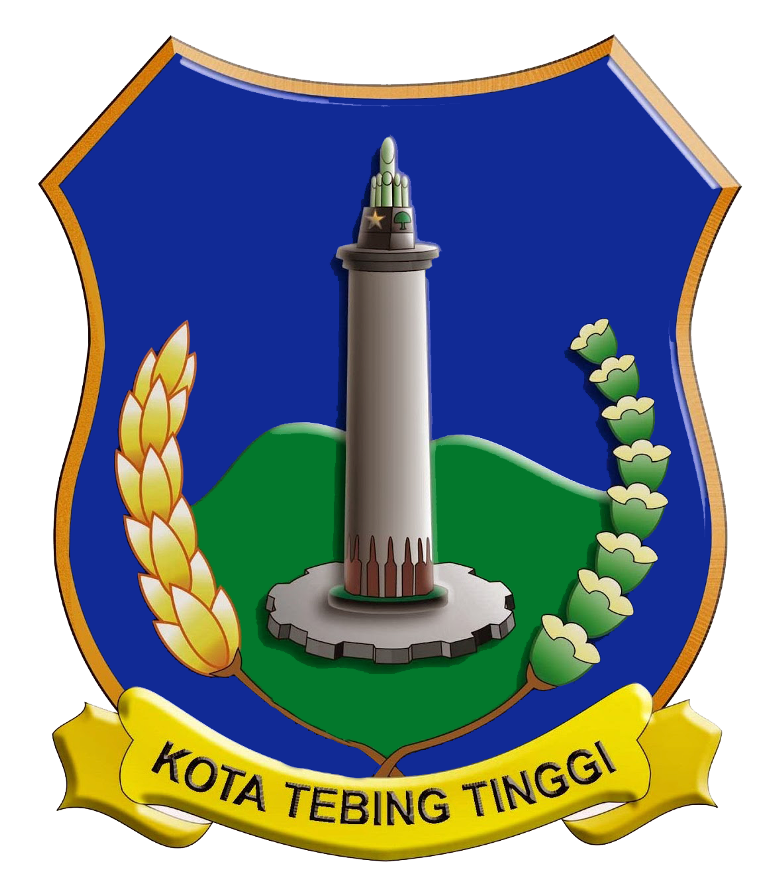
Tebing Tinggi City

=== West Sumatra ===
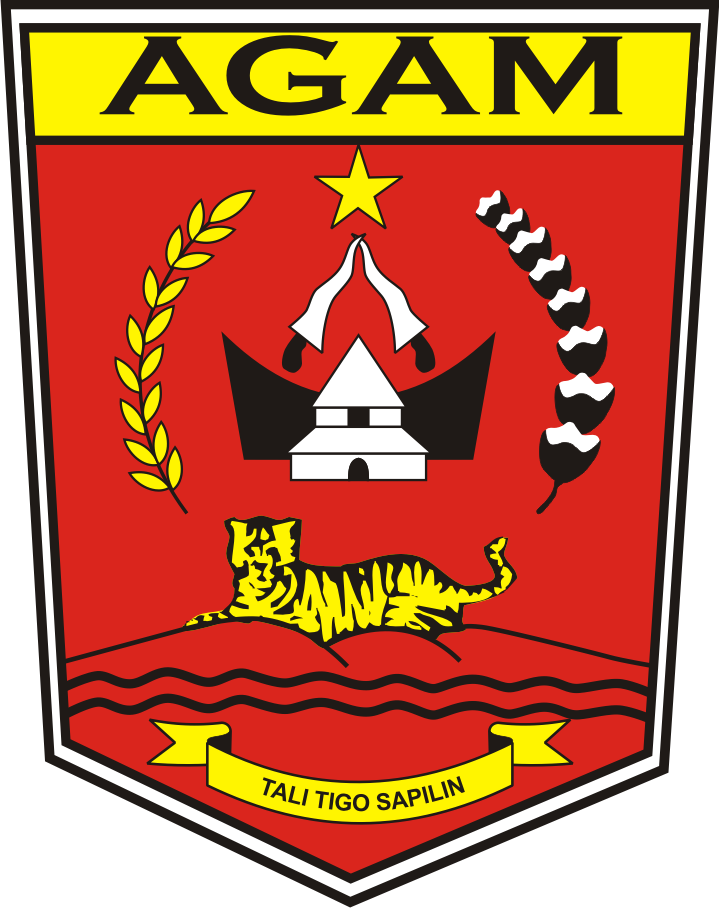
Agam Regency

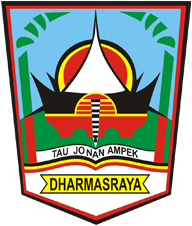
Dharmasraya Regency

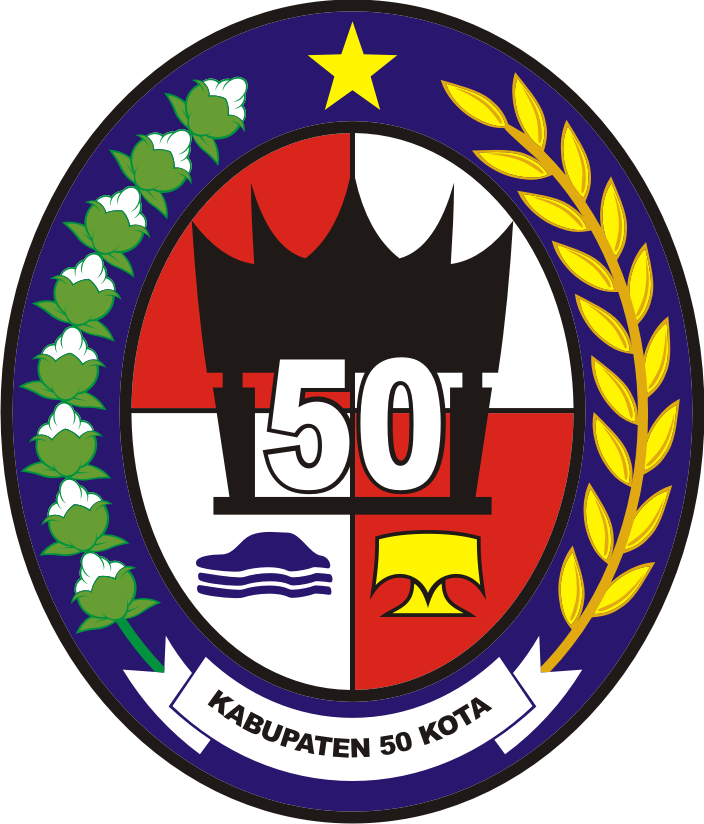
Lima Puluh Kota Regency

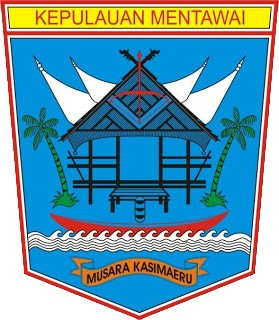
Mentawai Islands Regency

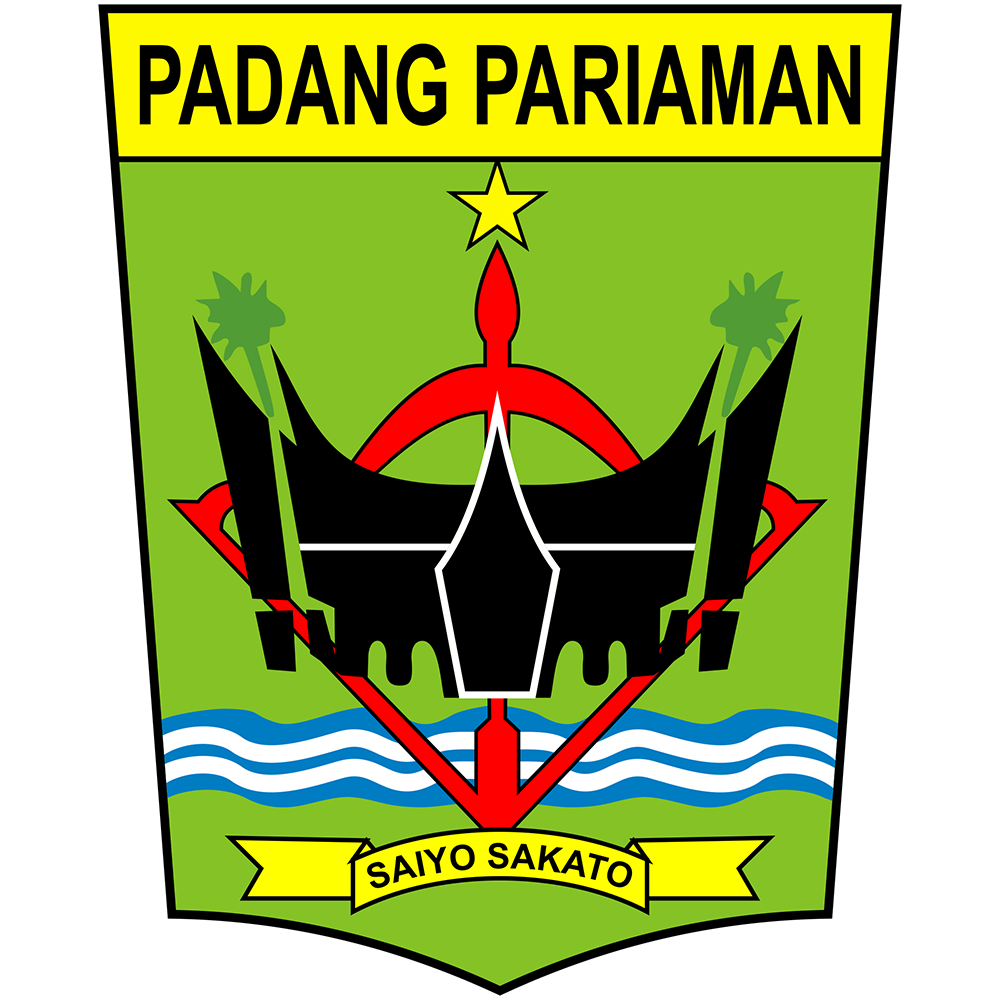
Padang Pariaman Regency

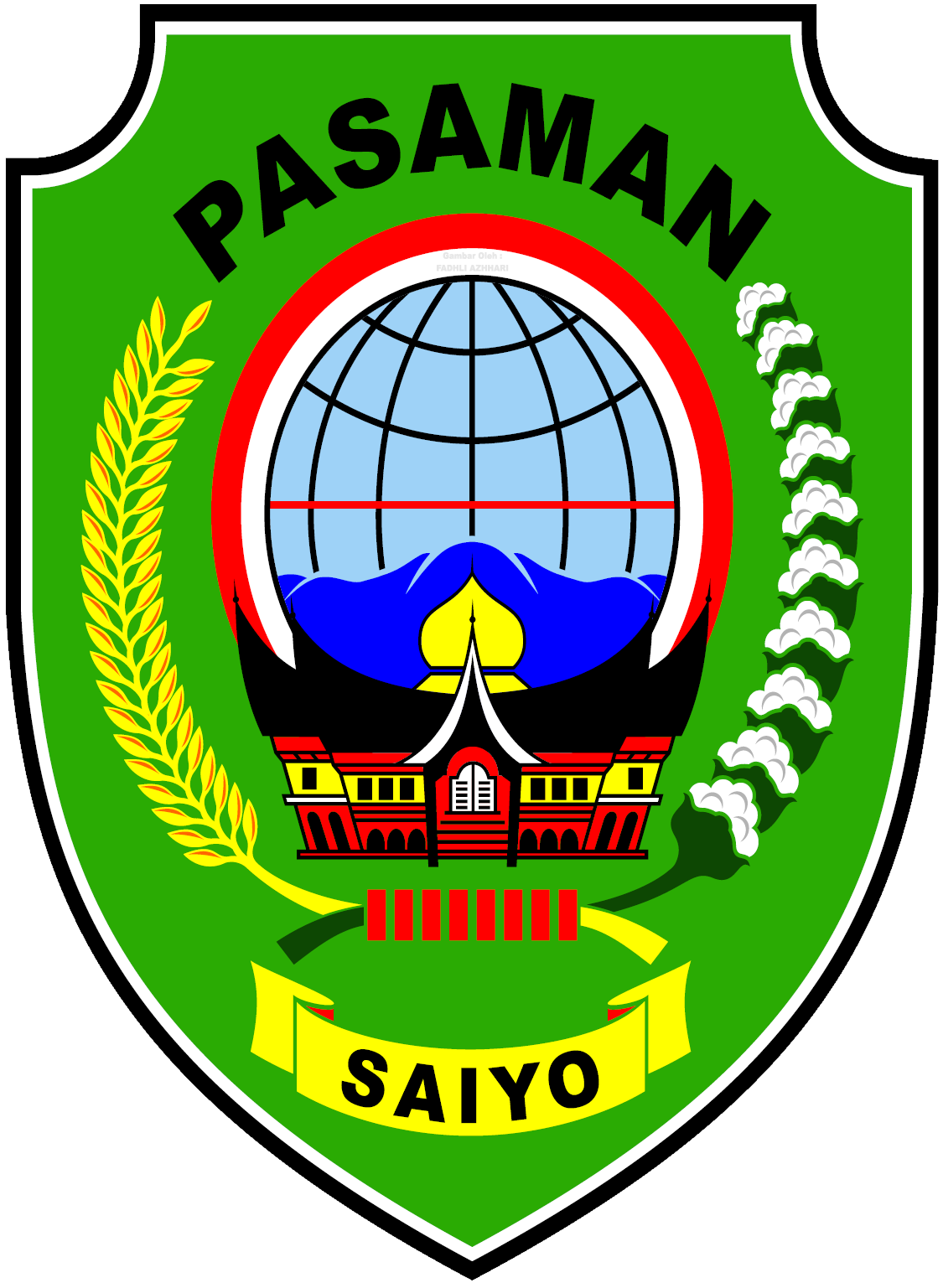
Pasaman Regency

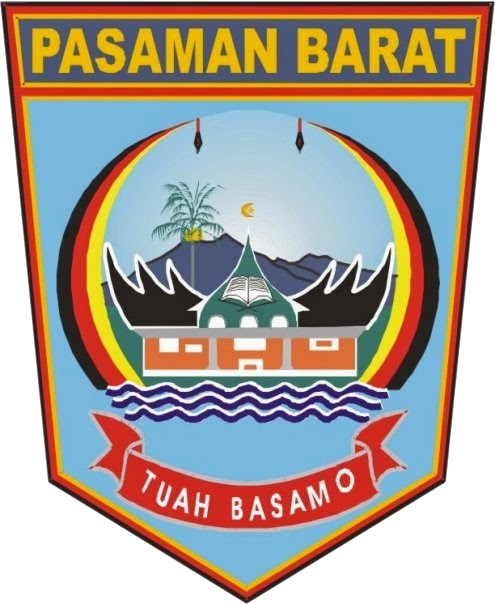
West Pasaman Regency

Pesisir Selatan Regency

Sijunjung Regency

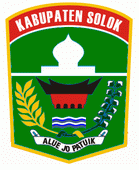
Solok Regency

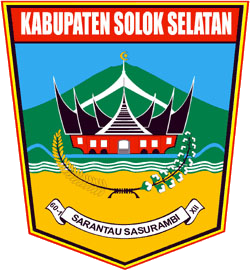
South Solok Regency

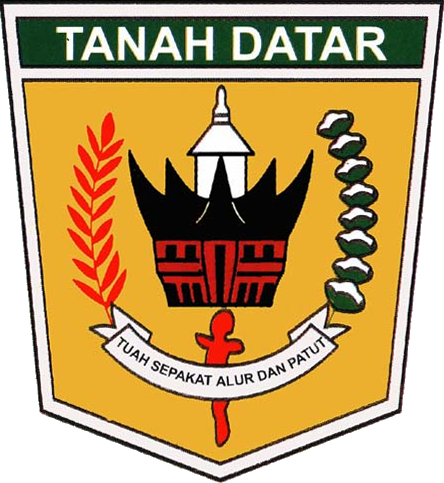
Tanah Datar Regency

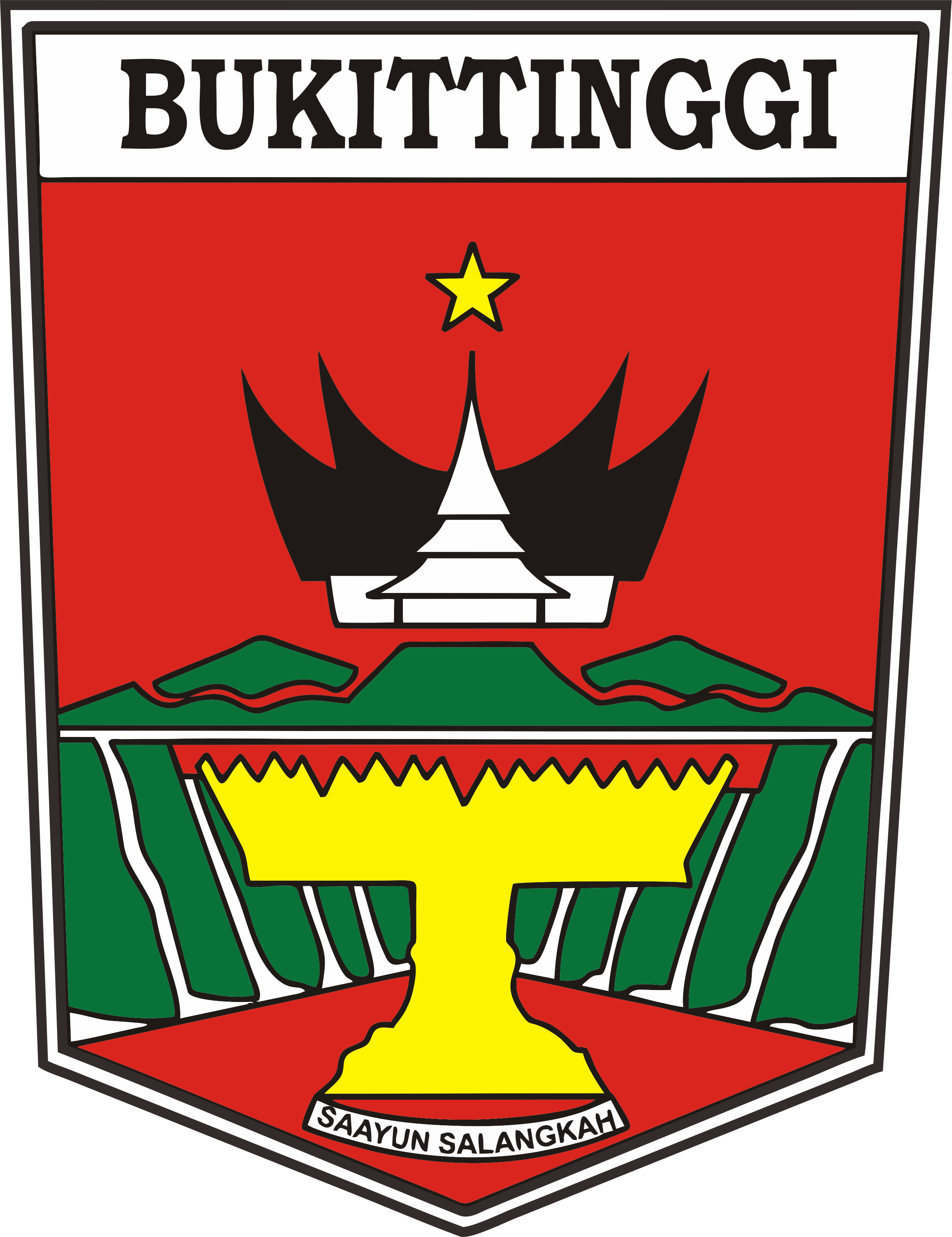
Bukittinggi City

Padang City

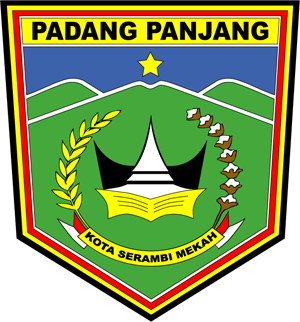
Padang Panjang City

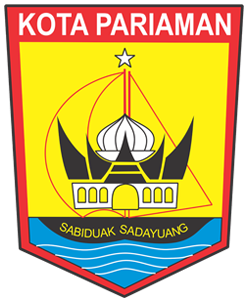
Pariaman City

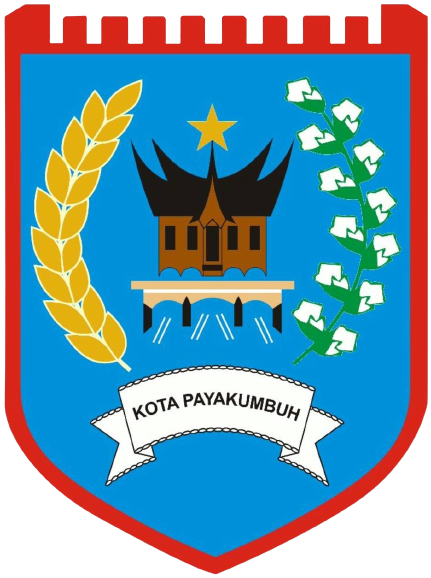
Payakumbuh City

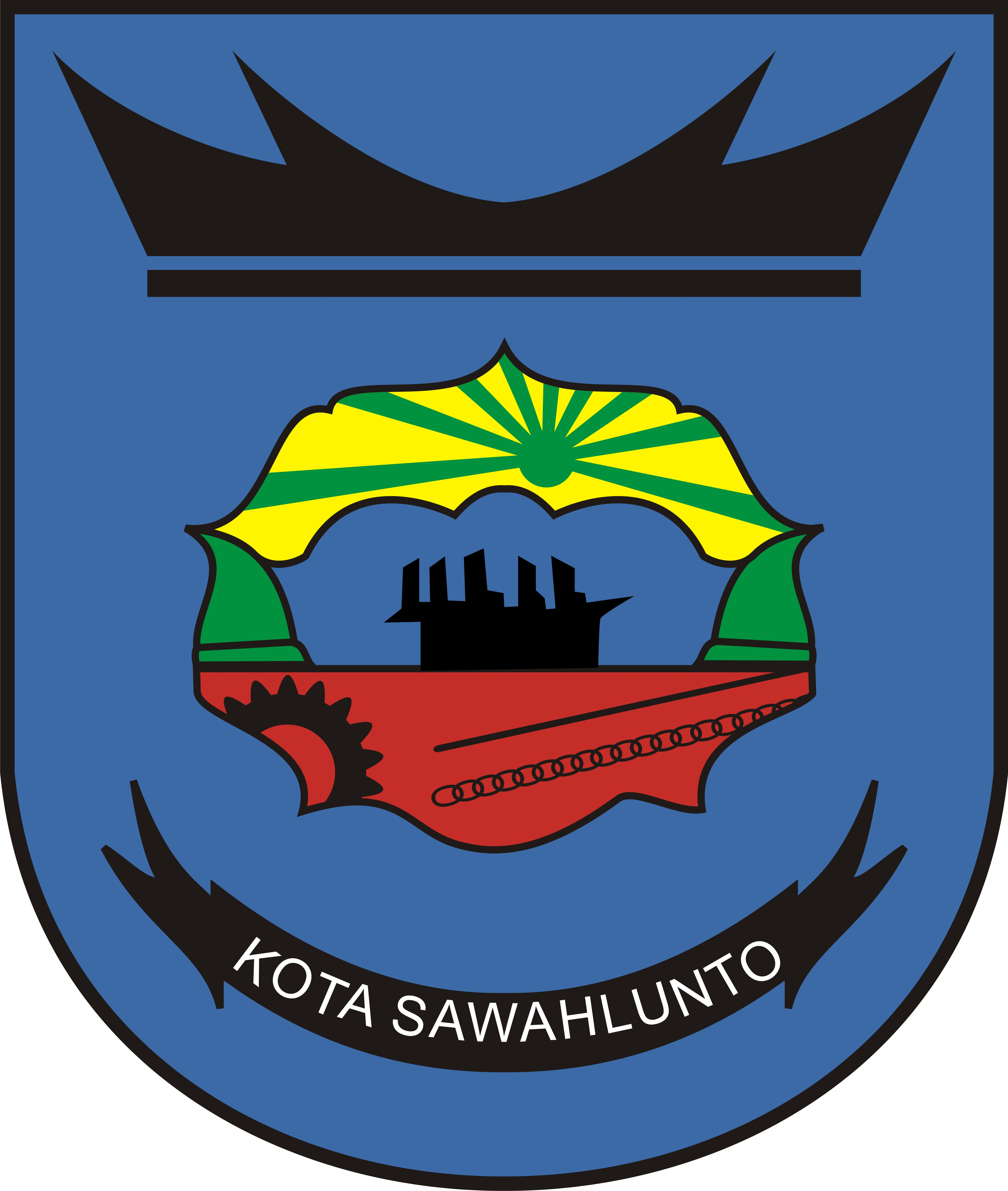
Sawahlunto City

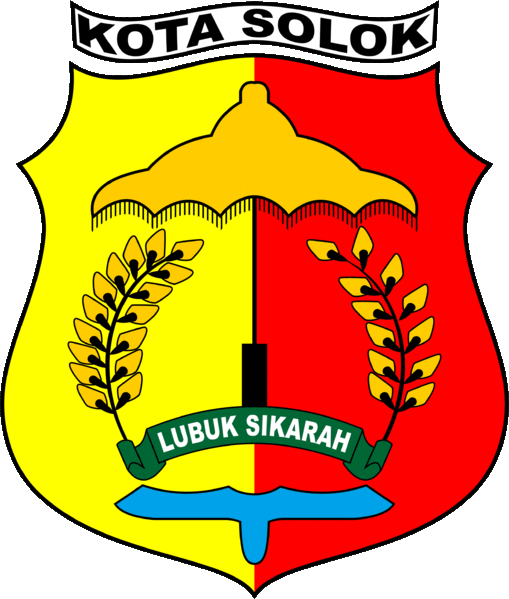
Solok City

=== Riau ===
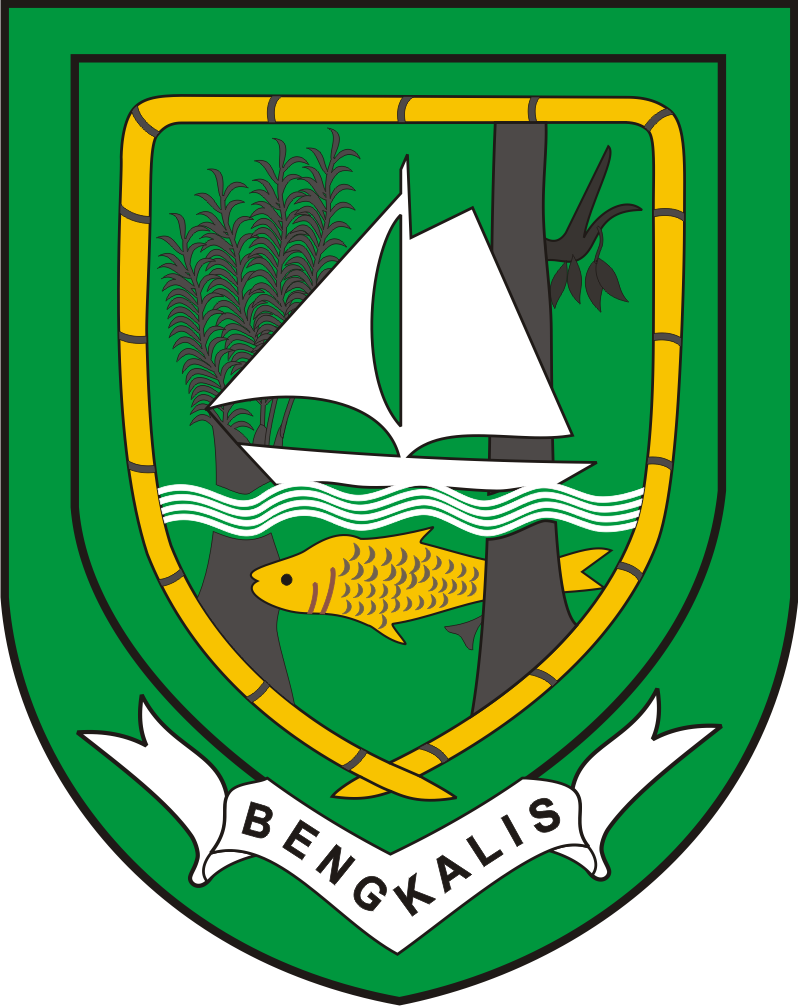
Bengkalis Regency

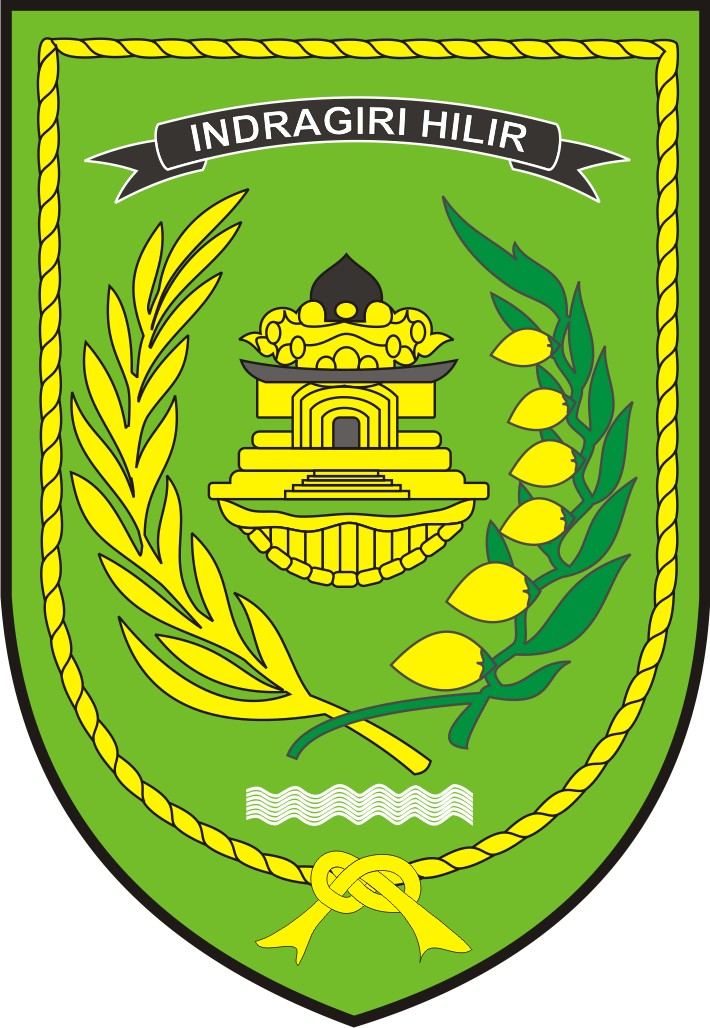
Indragiri Hilir Regency

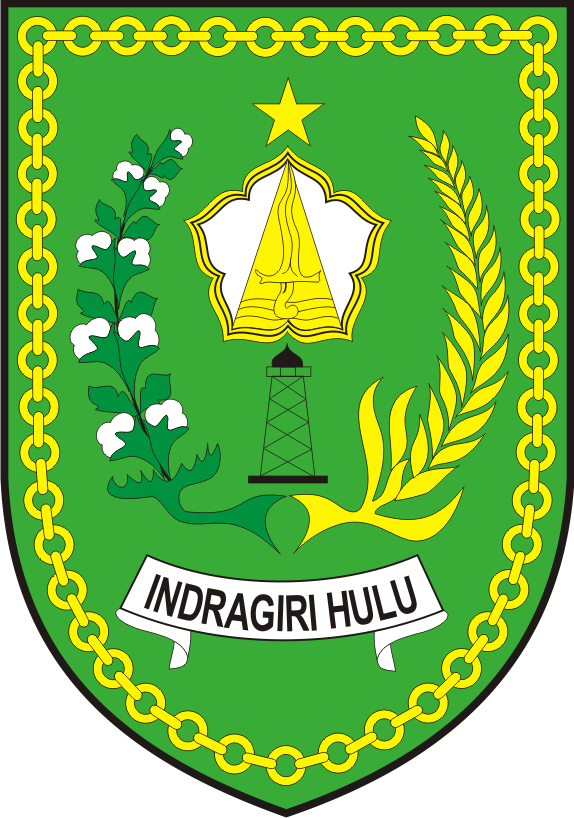
Indragiri Hulu Regency

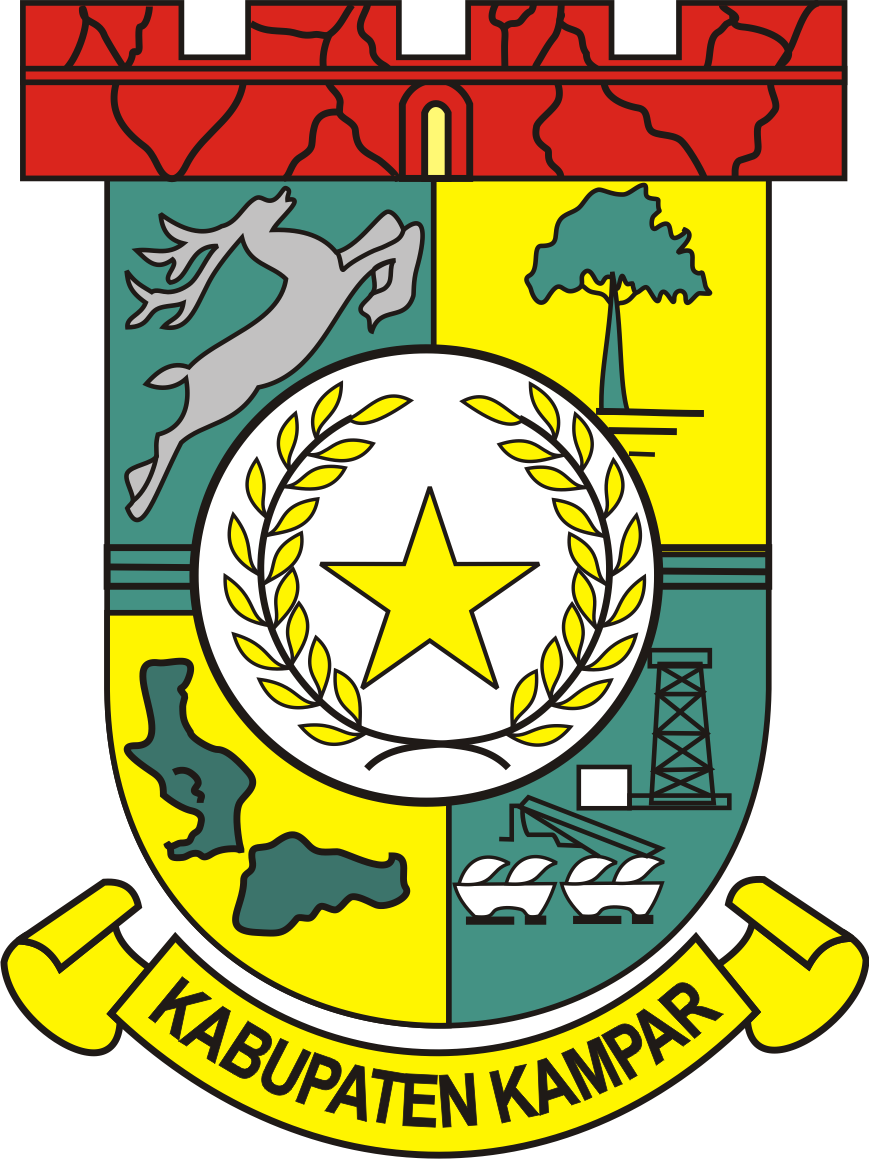
Kampar Regency

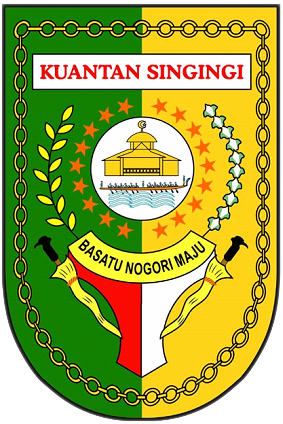
Kuantan Singingi Regency

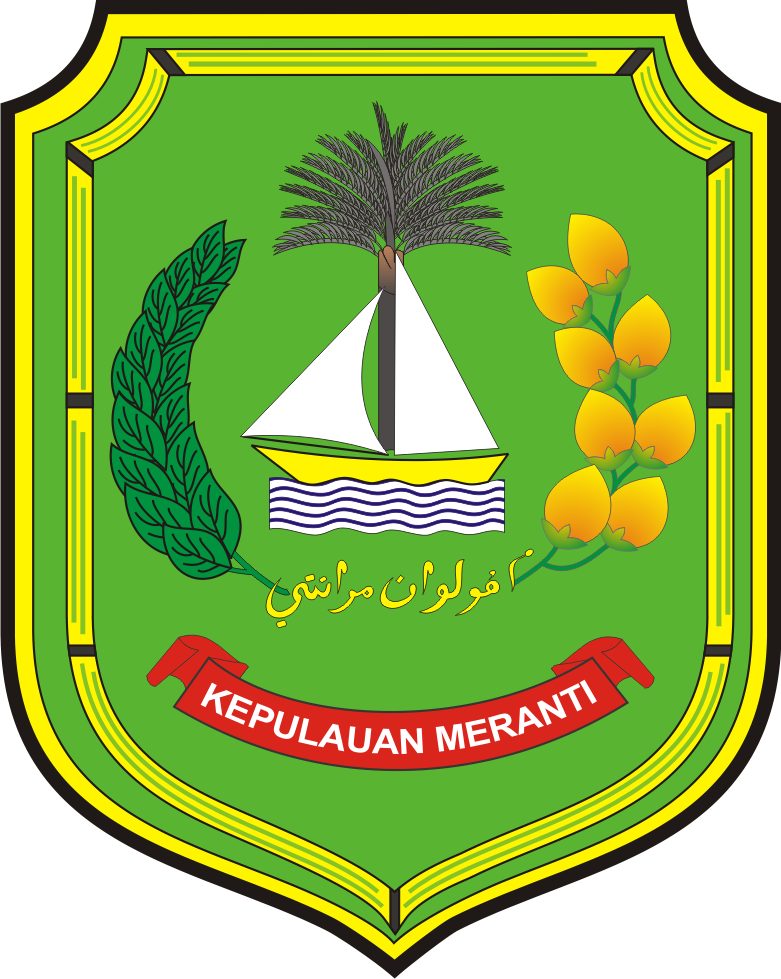
Meranti Islands Regency

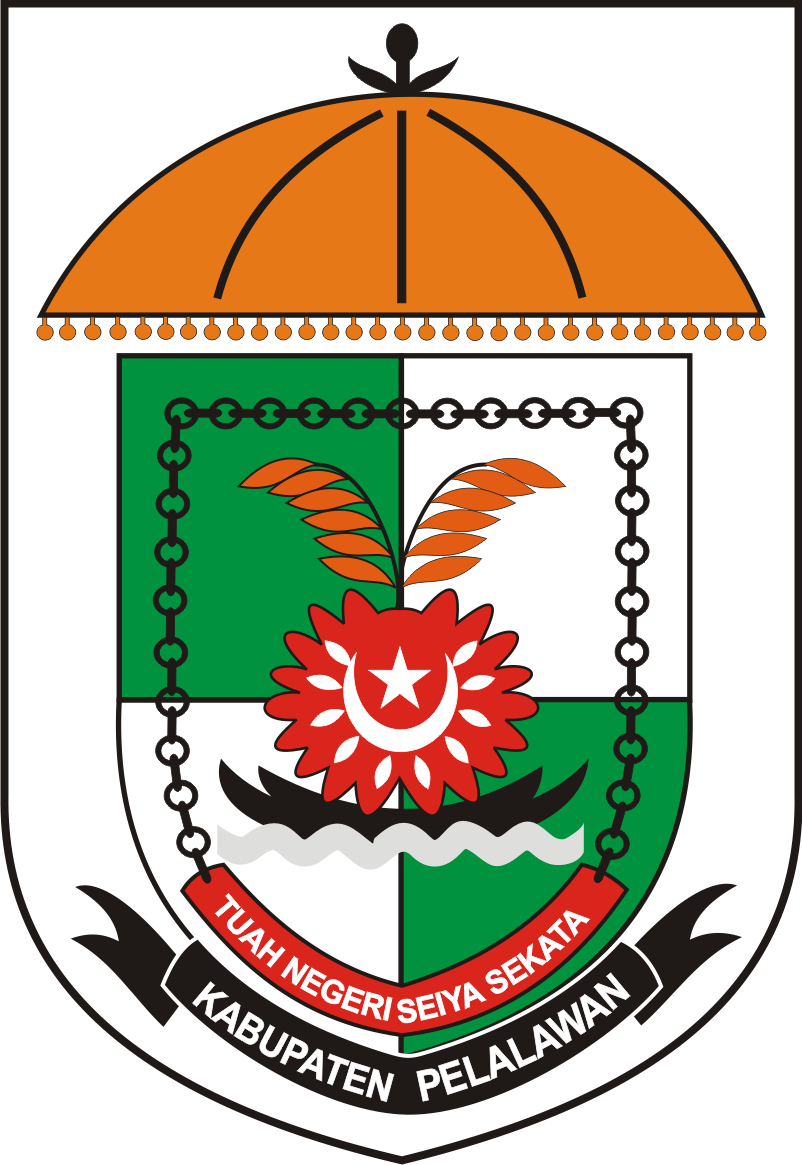
Pelalawan Regency

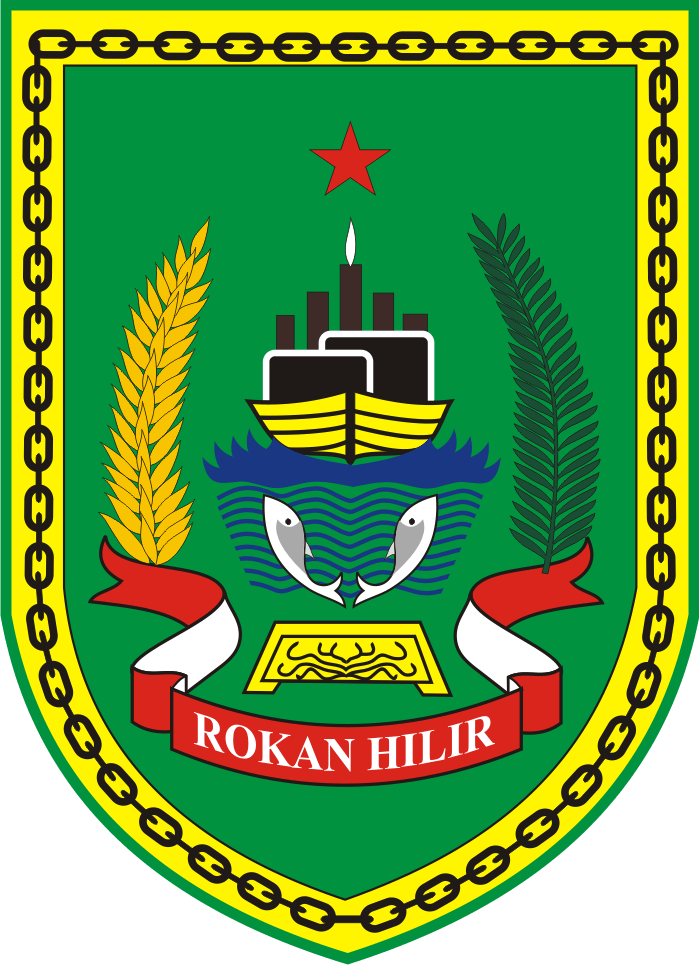
Rokan Hilir Regency

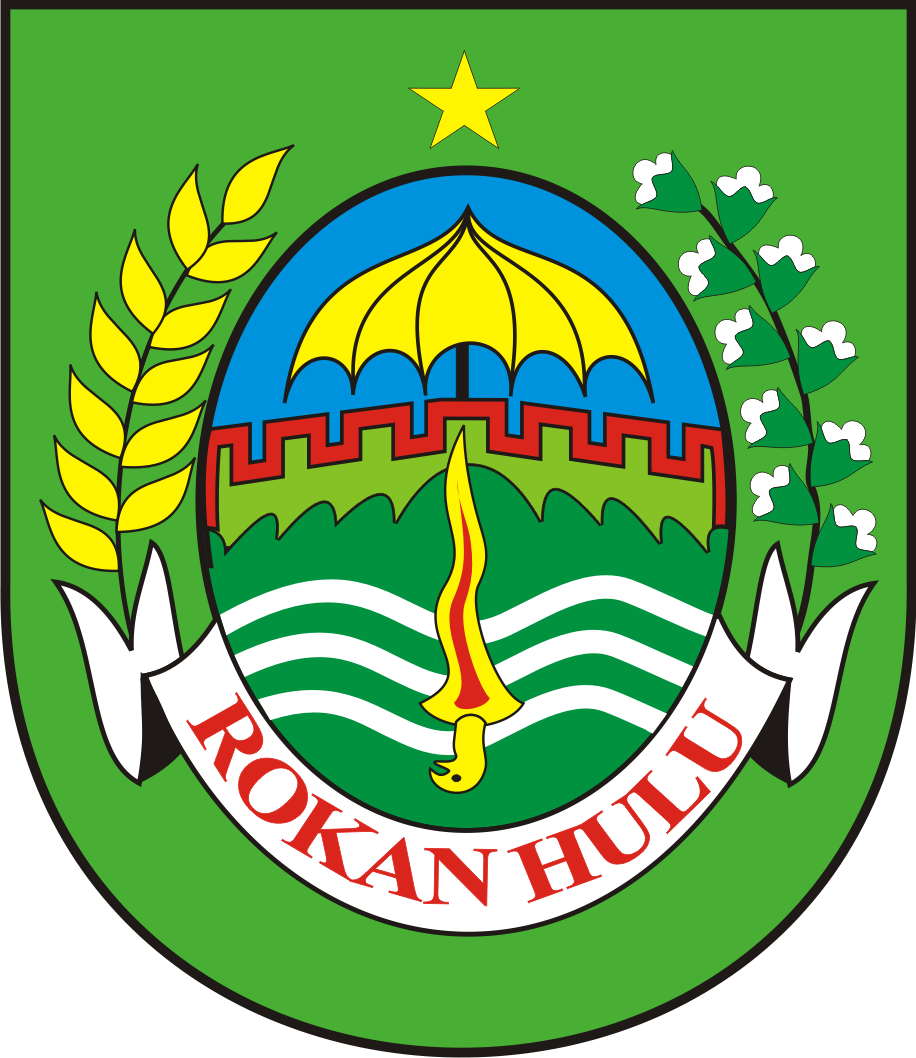
Rokan Hulu Regency

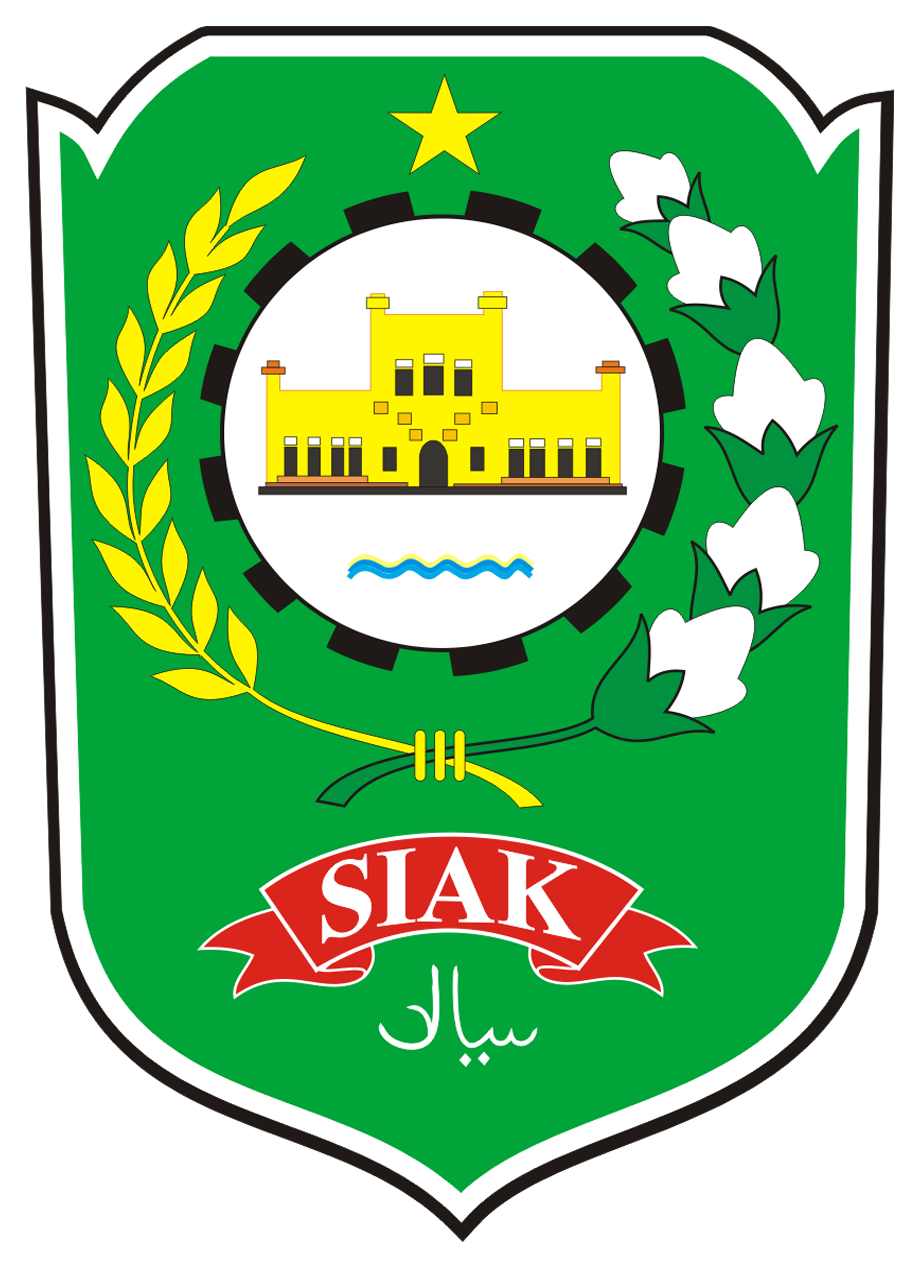
Siak Regency

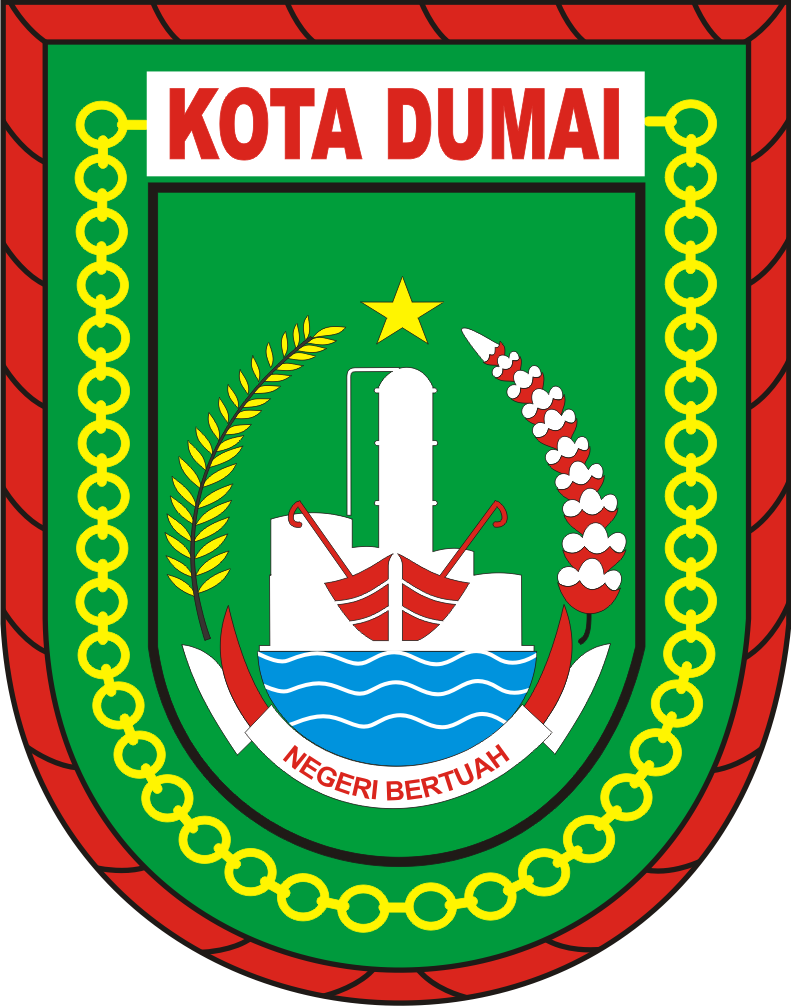
Dumai City

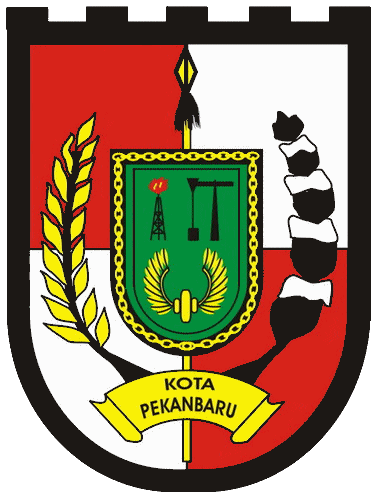
Pekanbaru City

=== Riau Islands ===
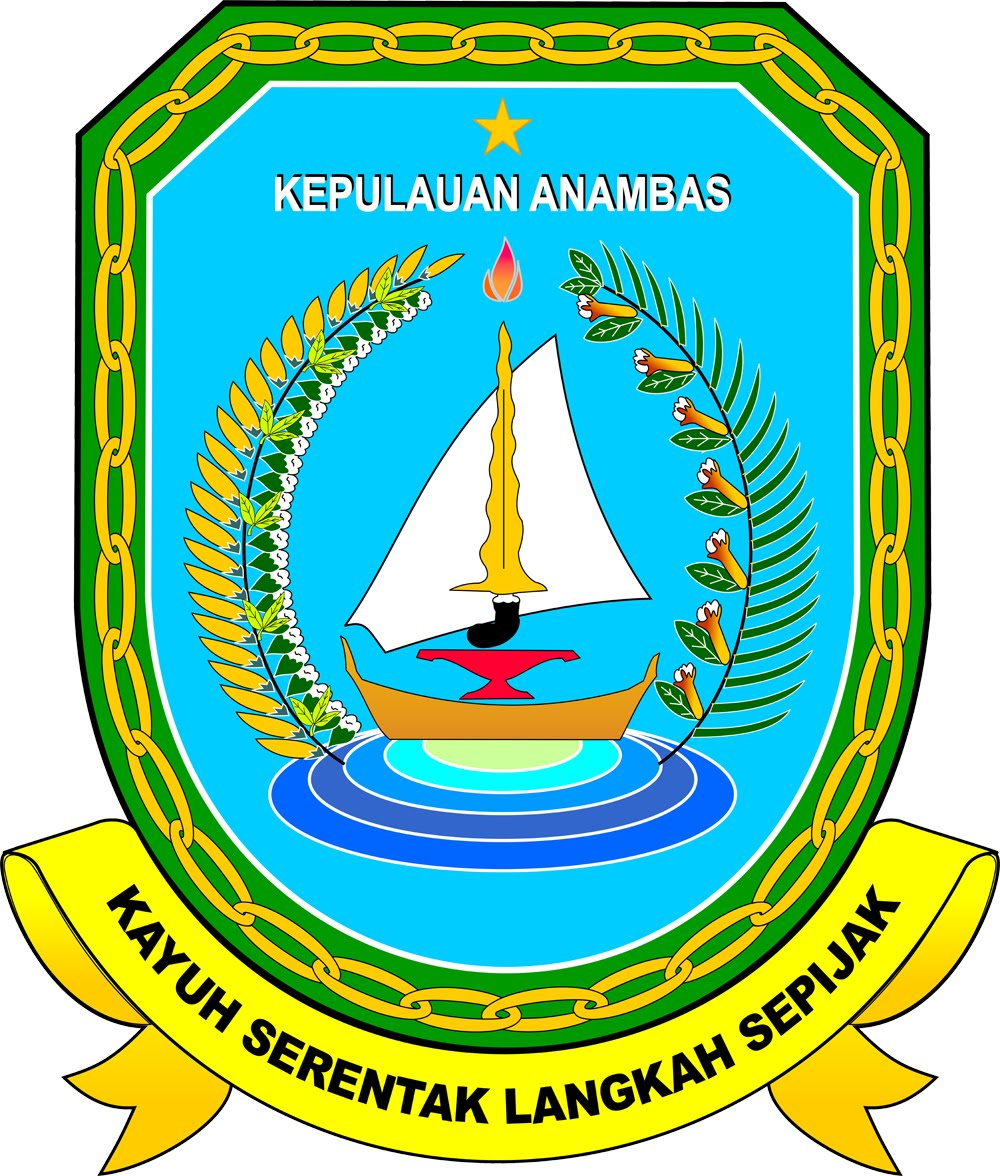
Anambas Islands Regency

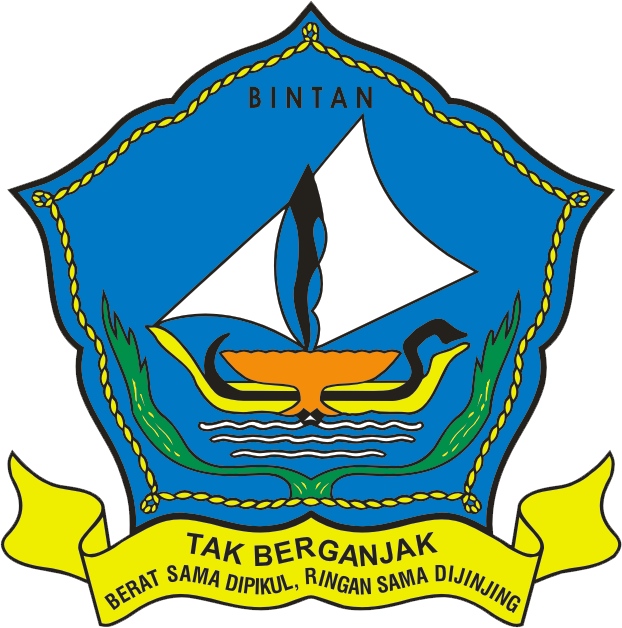
Bintan Regency

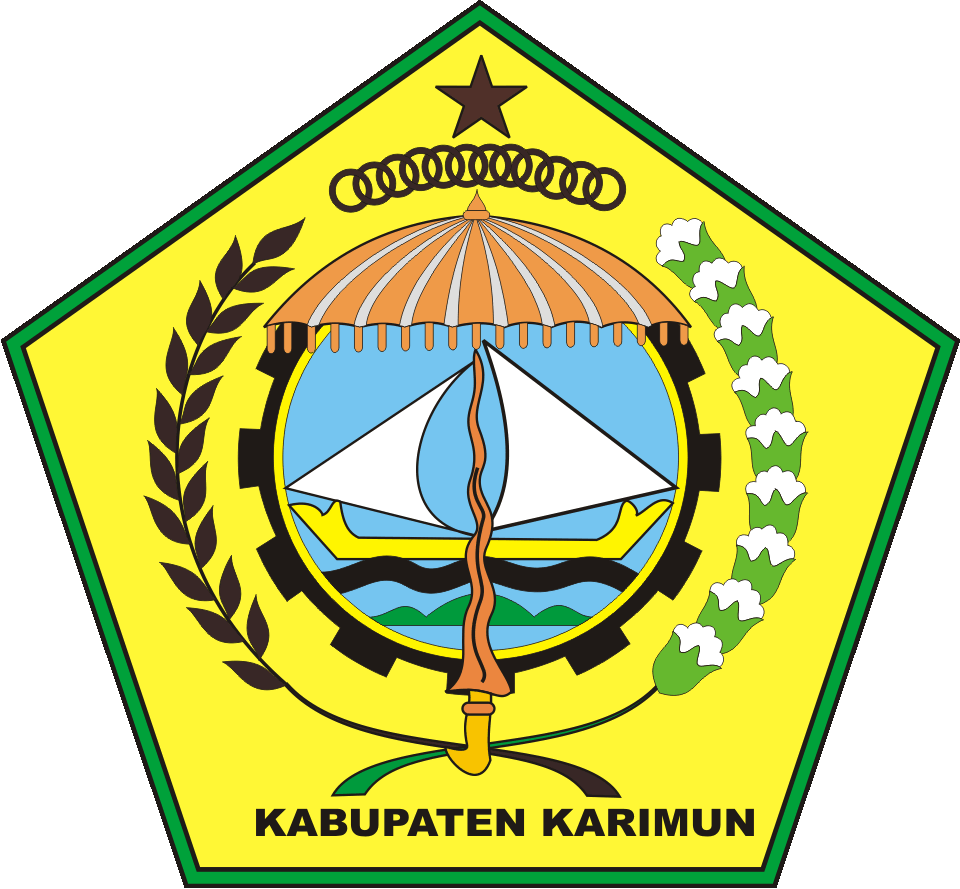
Karimun Regency

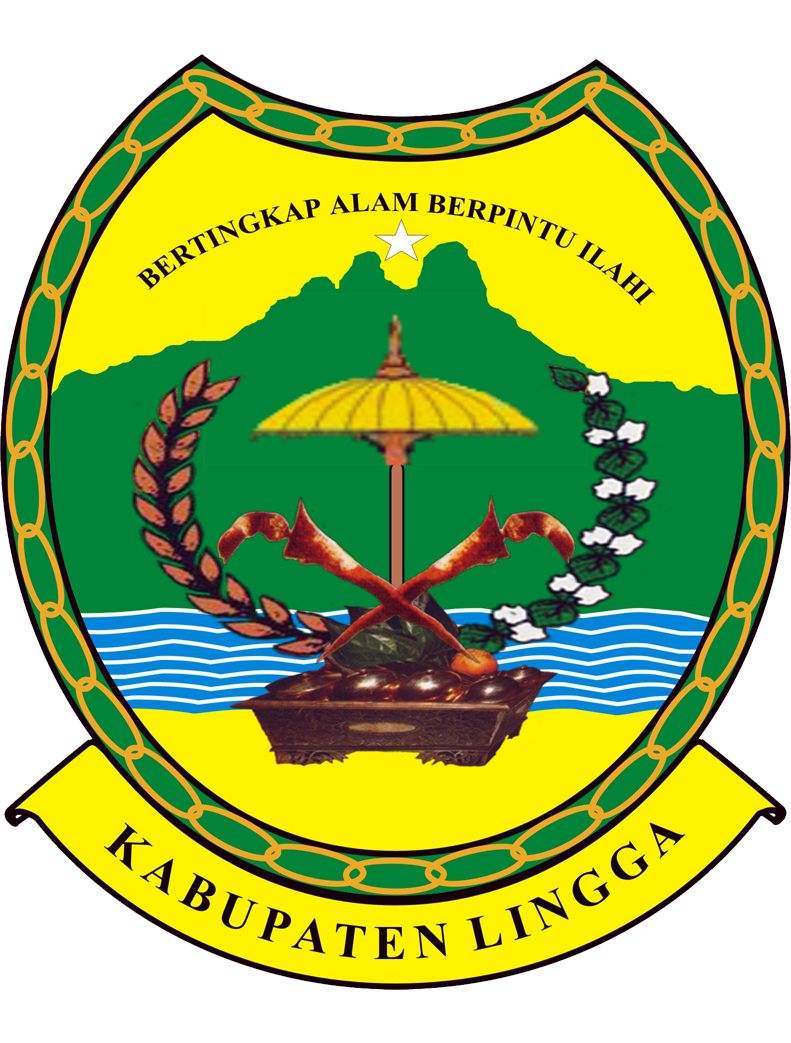
Lingga Regency

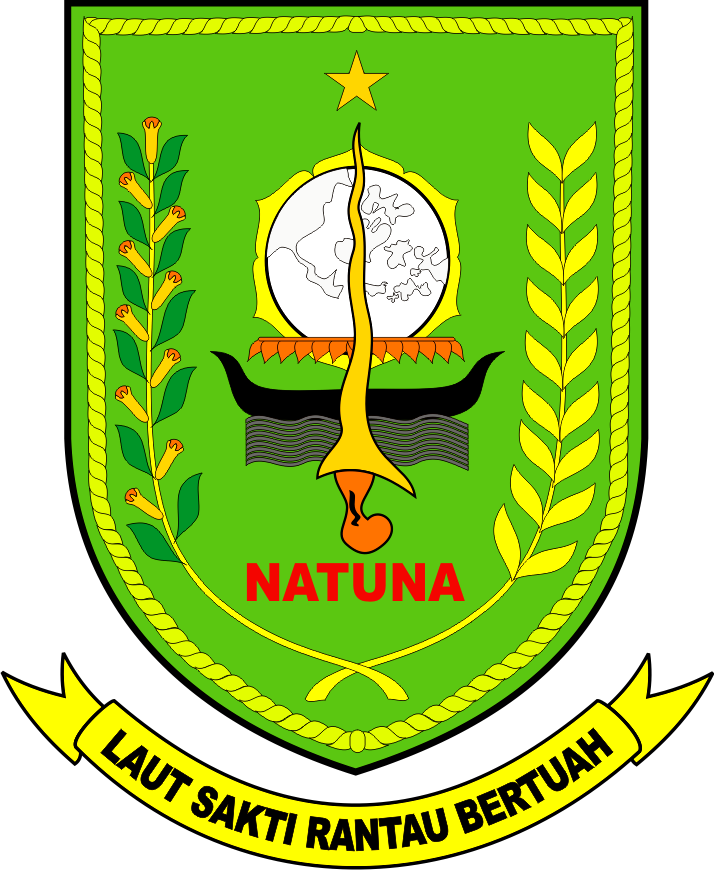
Natuna Regency

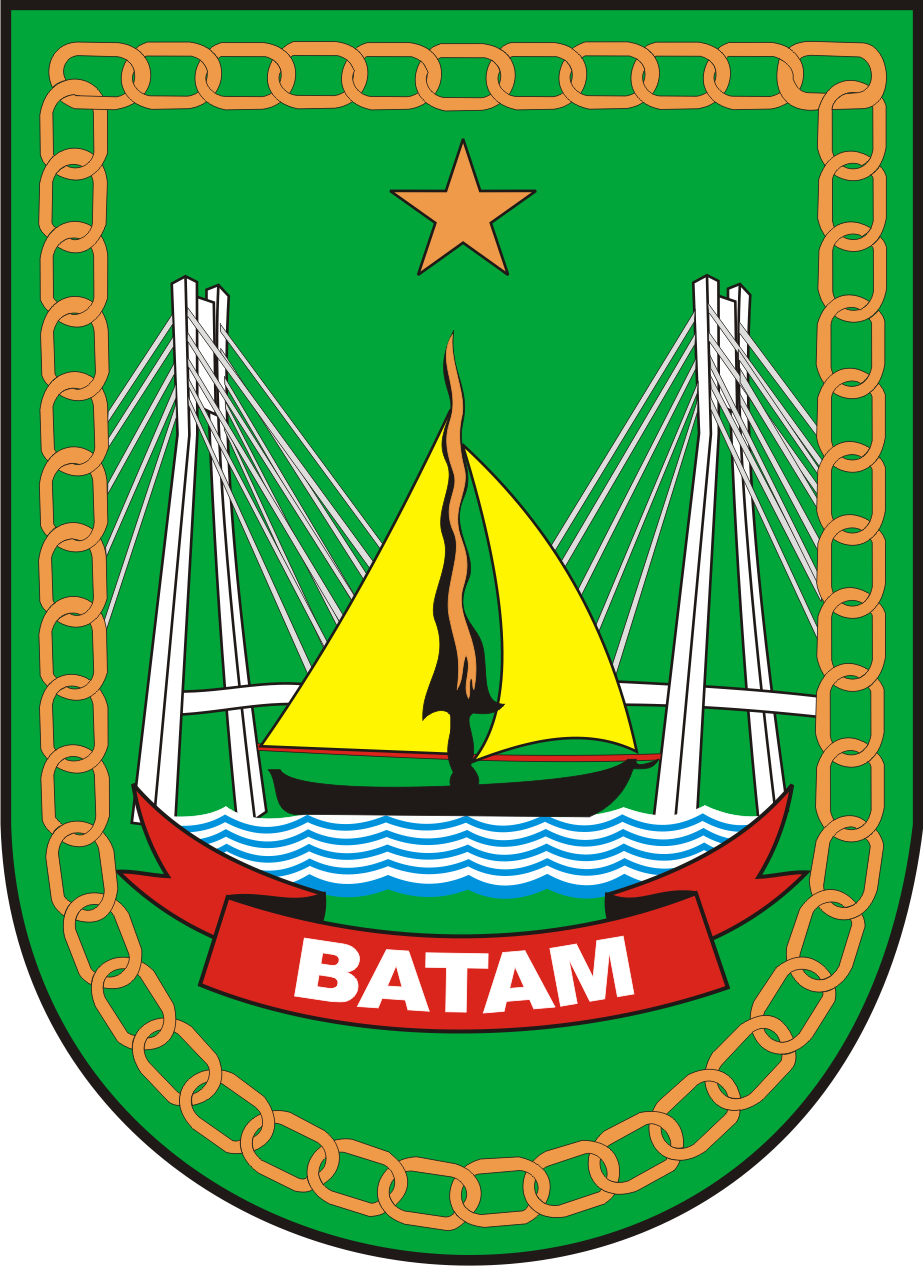
Batam City

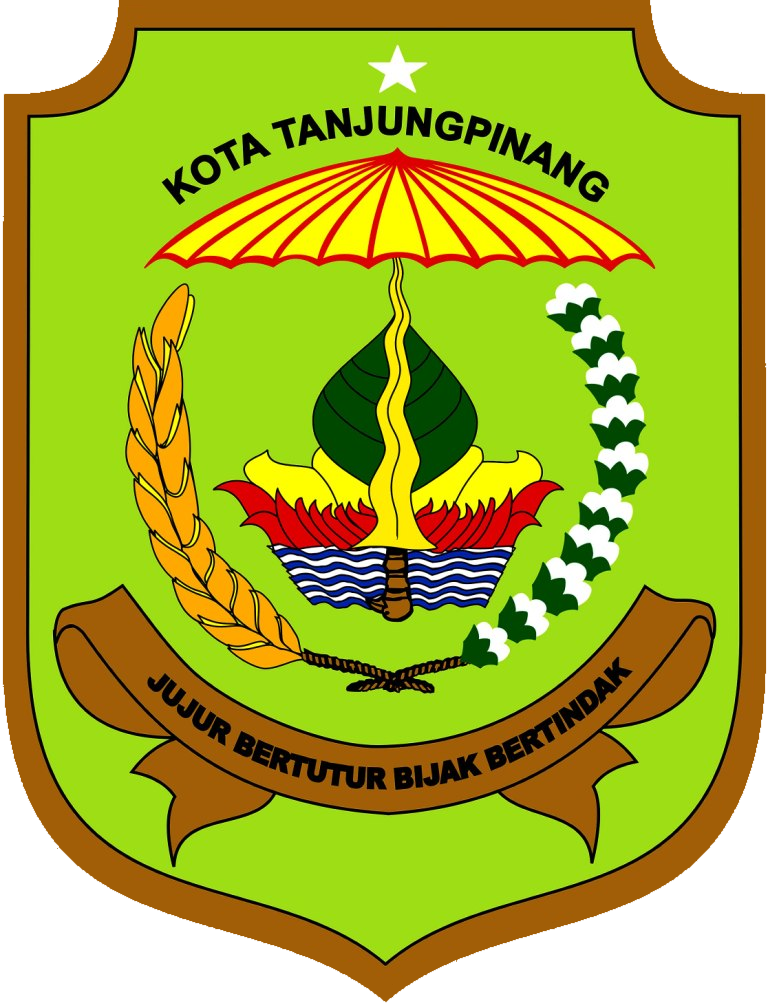
Tanjung Pinang City

=== Jambi ===
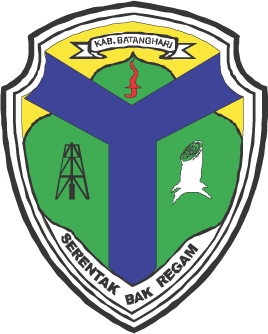
Batanghari Regency

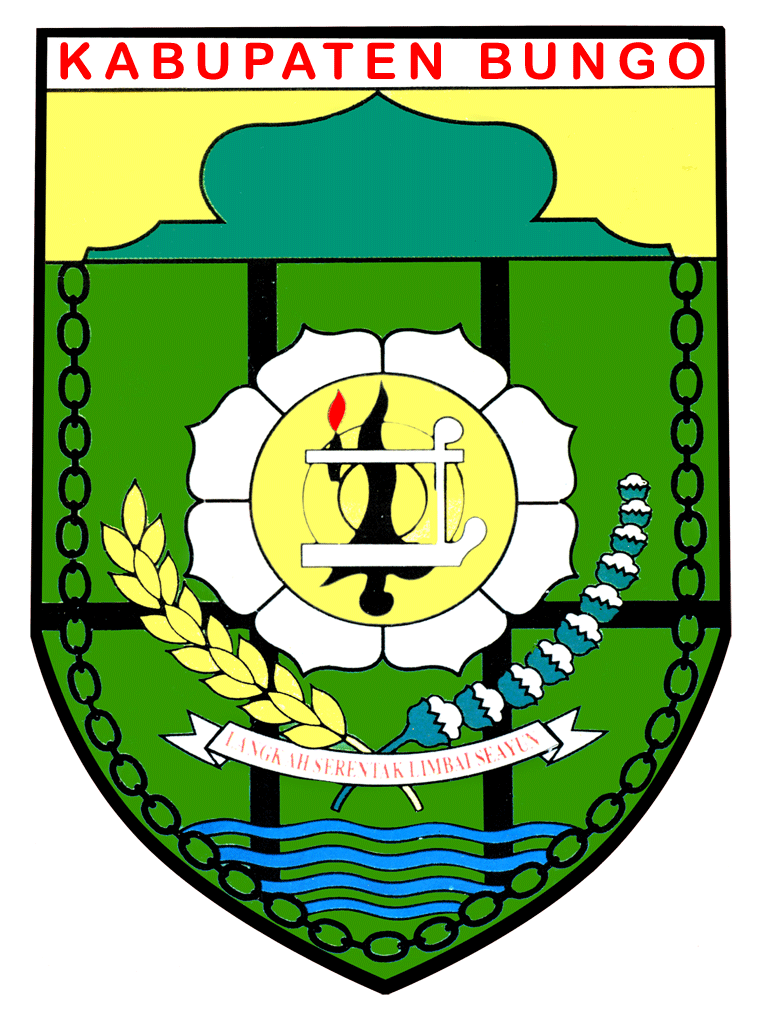
Bungo Regency

Kerinci Regency

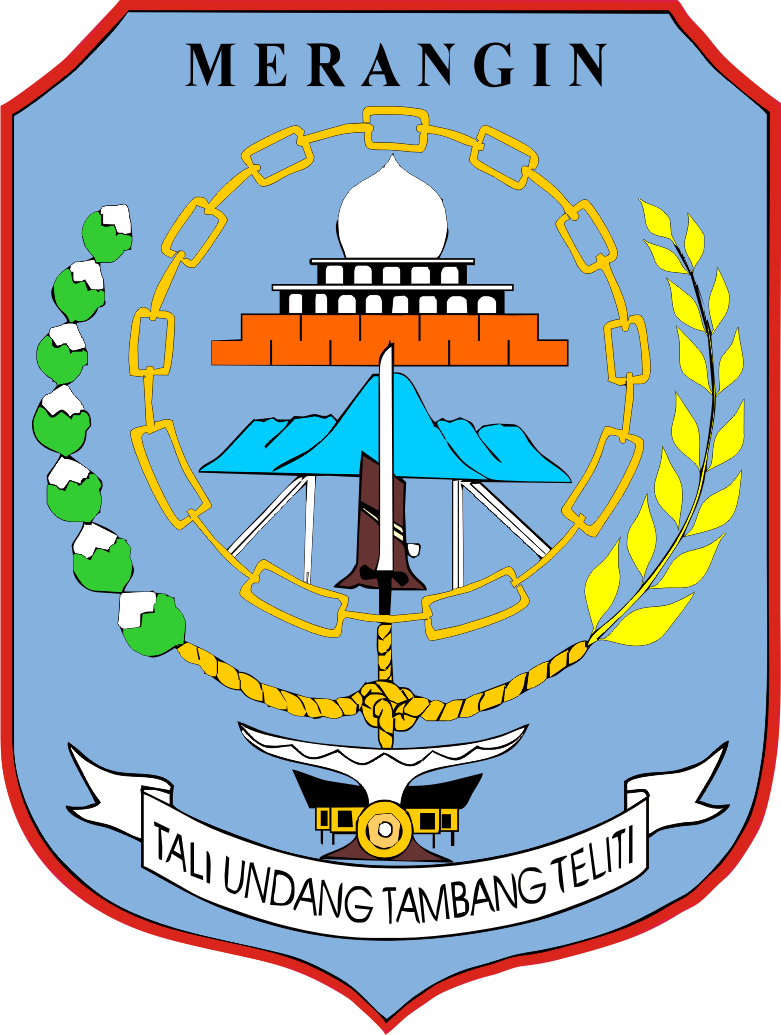
Merangin Regency

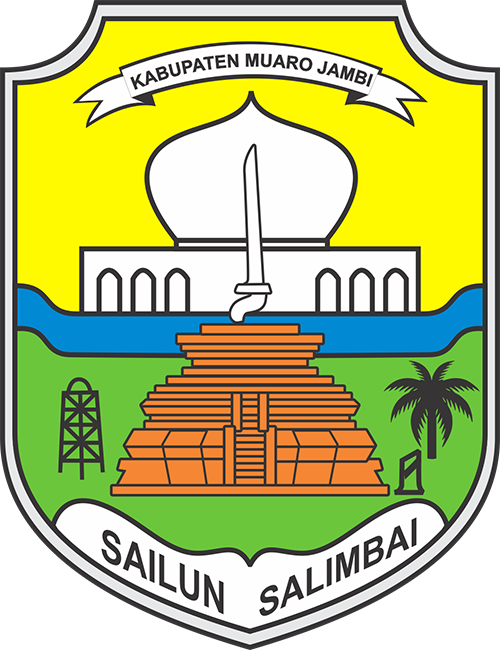
Muaro Jambi Regency

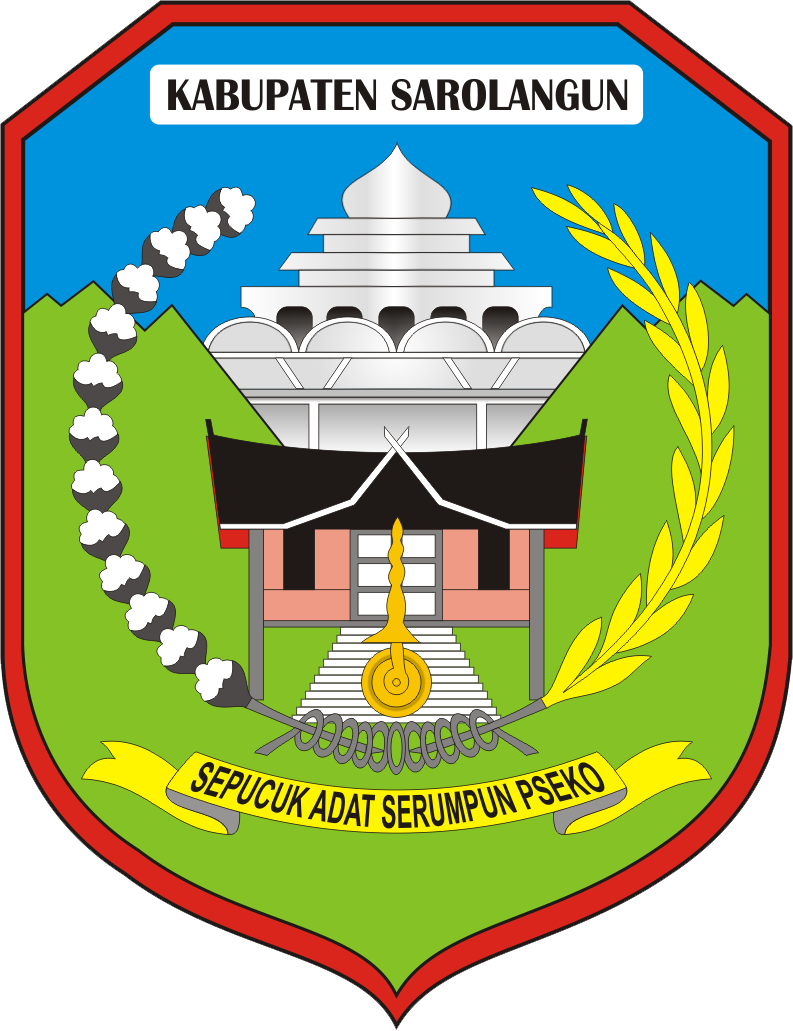
Sarolangun Regency

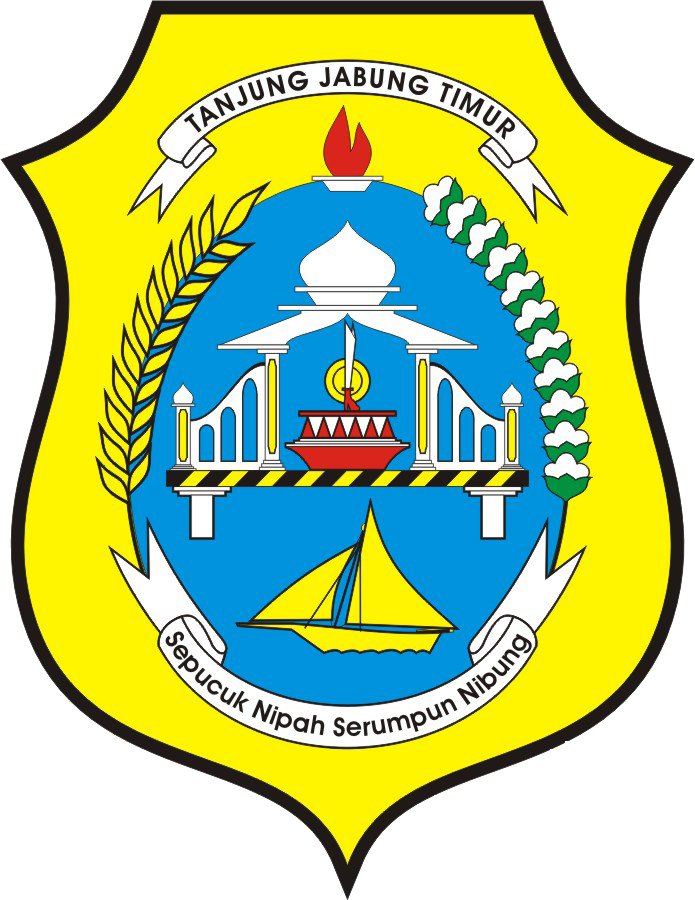
East Tanjung Jabung Regency

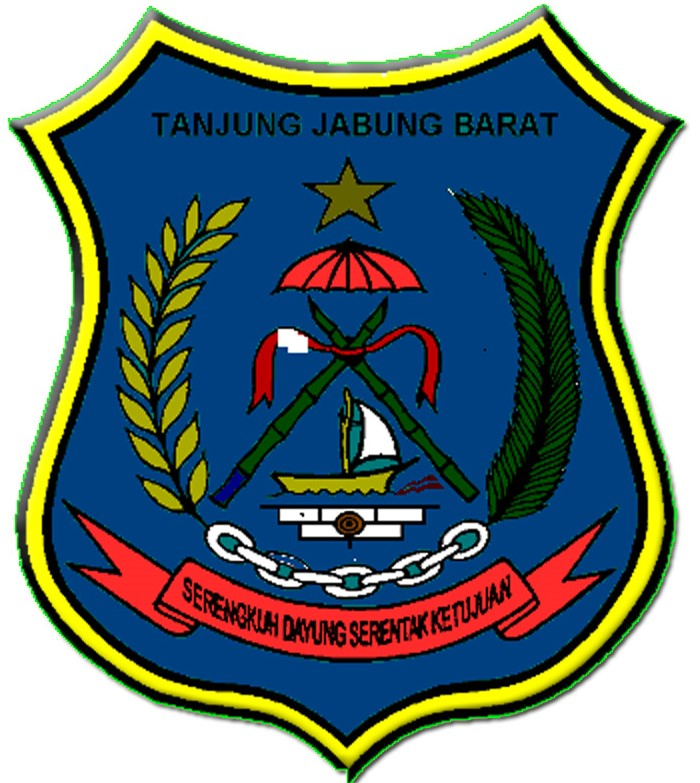
West Tanjung Jabung Regency

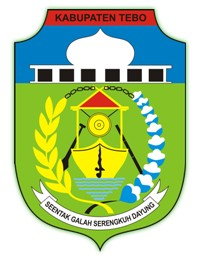
Tebo Regency

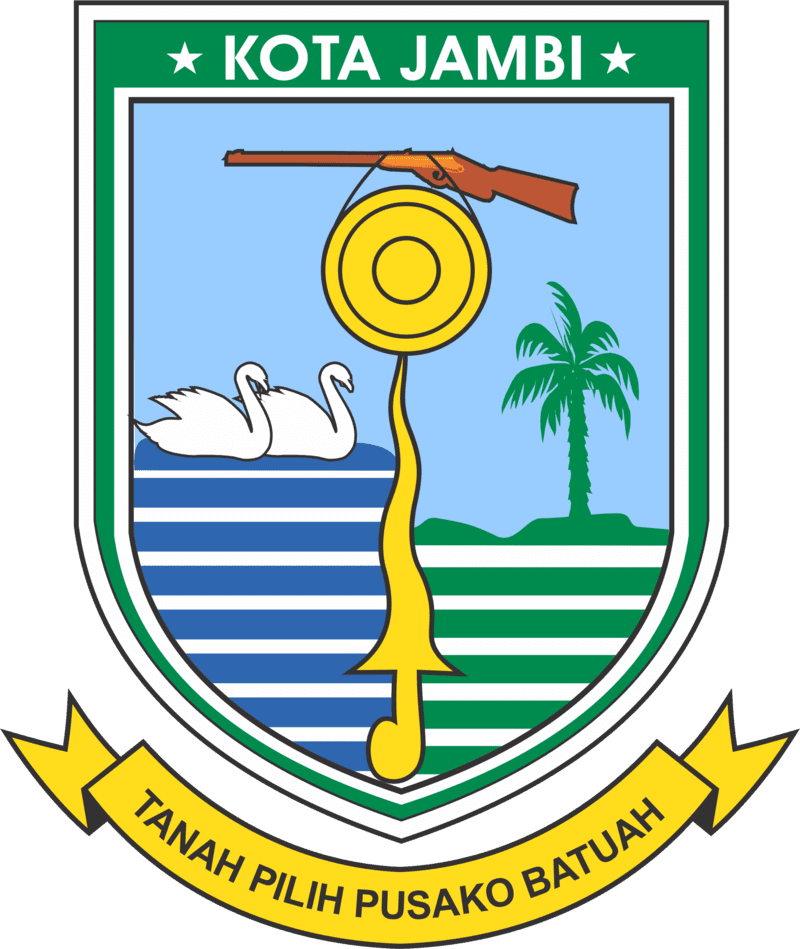
Jambi City

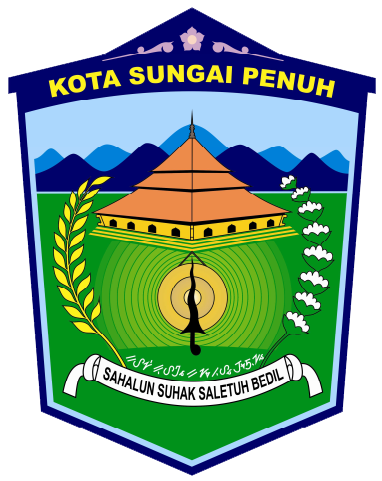
Sungai Penuh City

=== South Sumatra ===
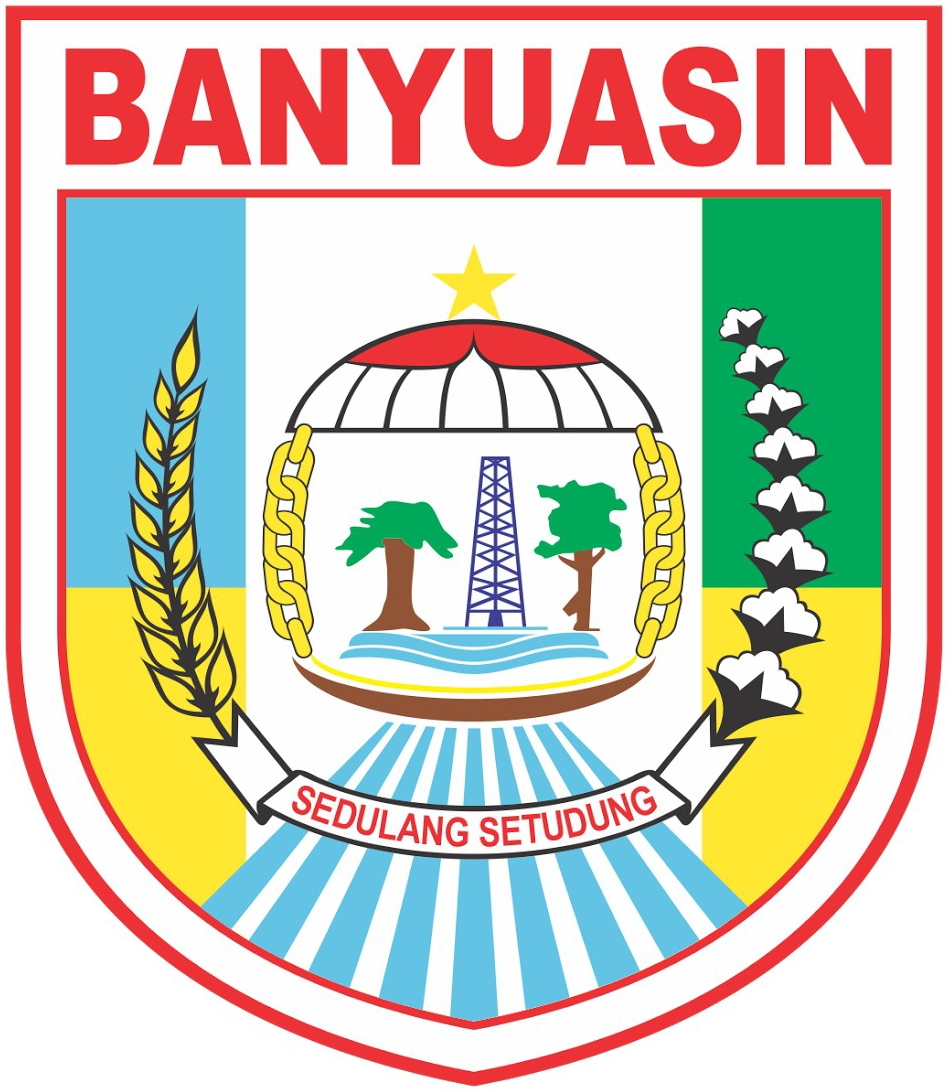
Banyuasin Regency

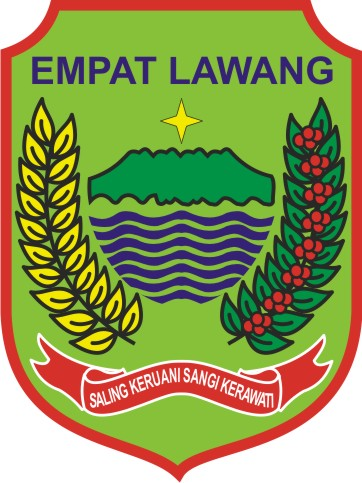
Empat Lawang Regency

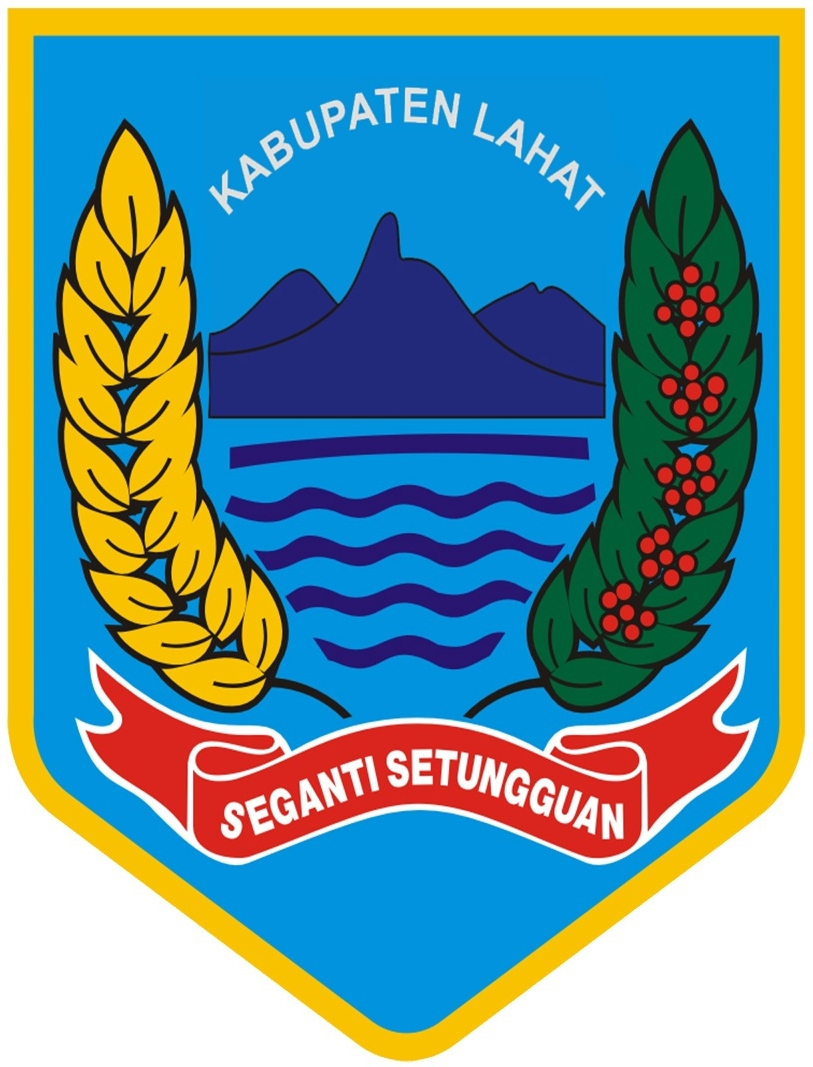
Lahat Regency

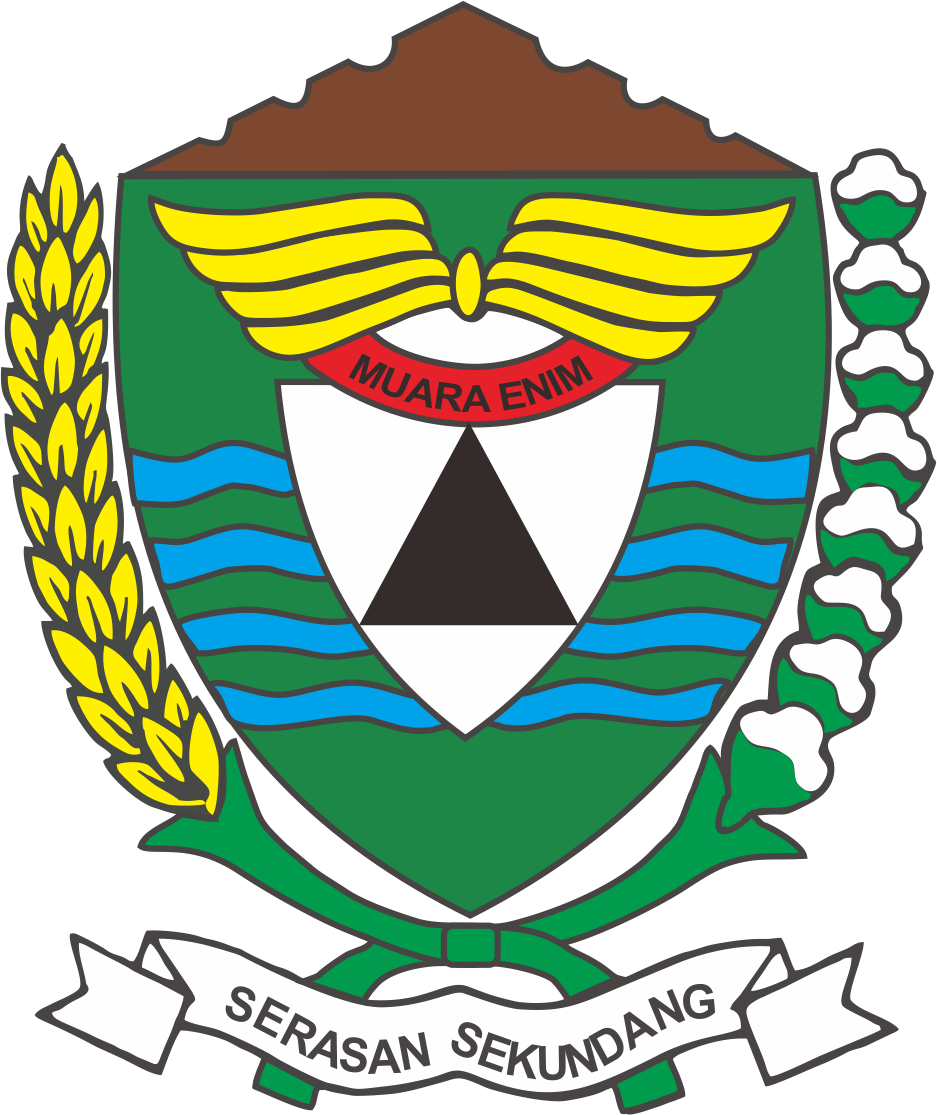
Muara Enim Regency

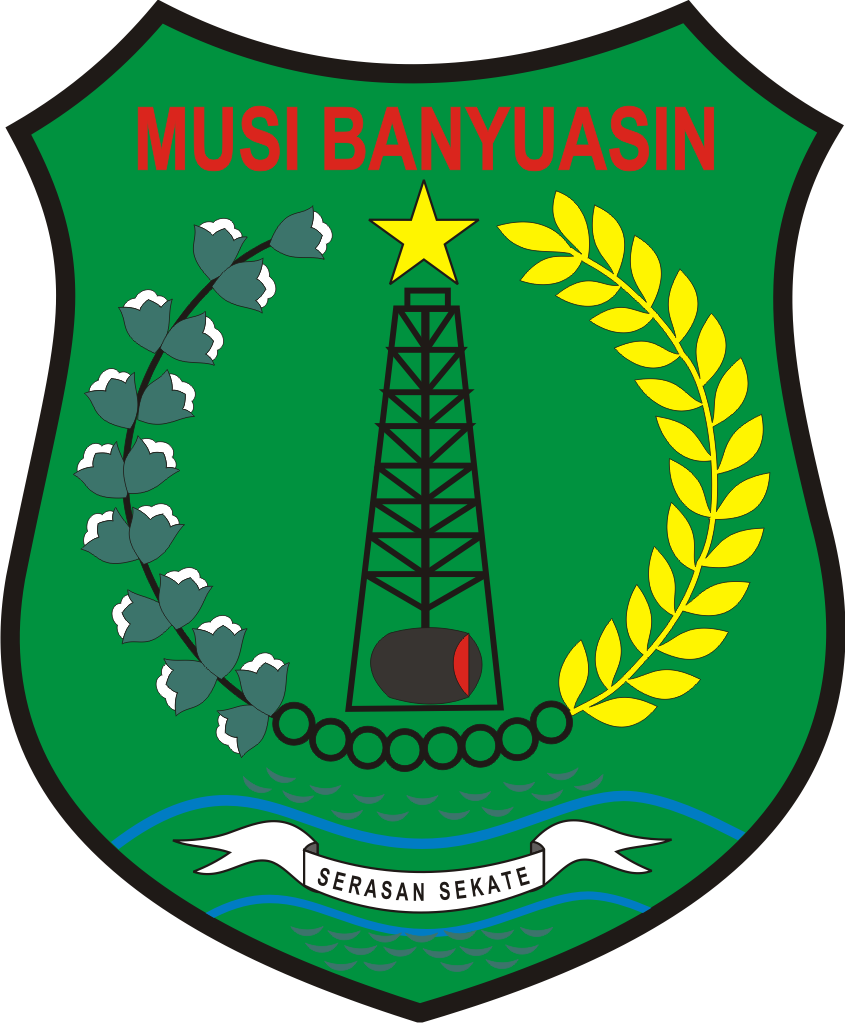
Musi Banyuasin Regency

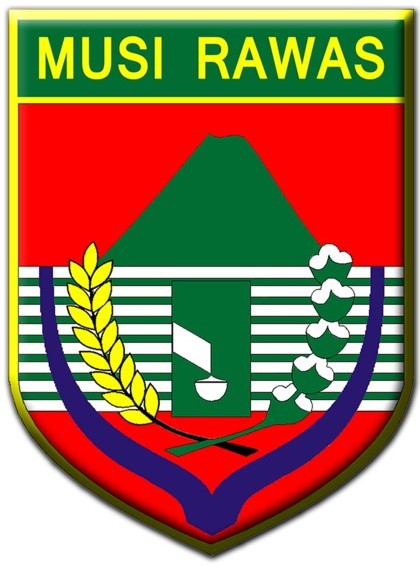
Musi Rawas Regency

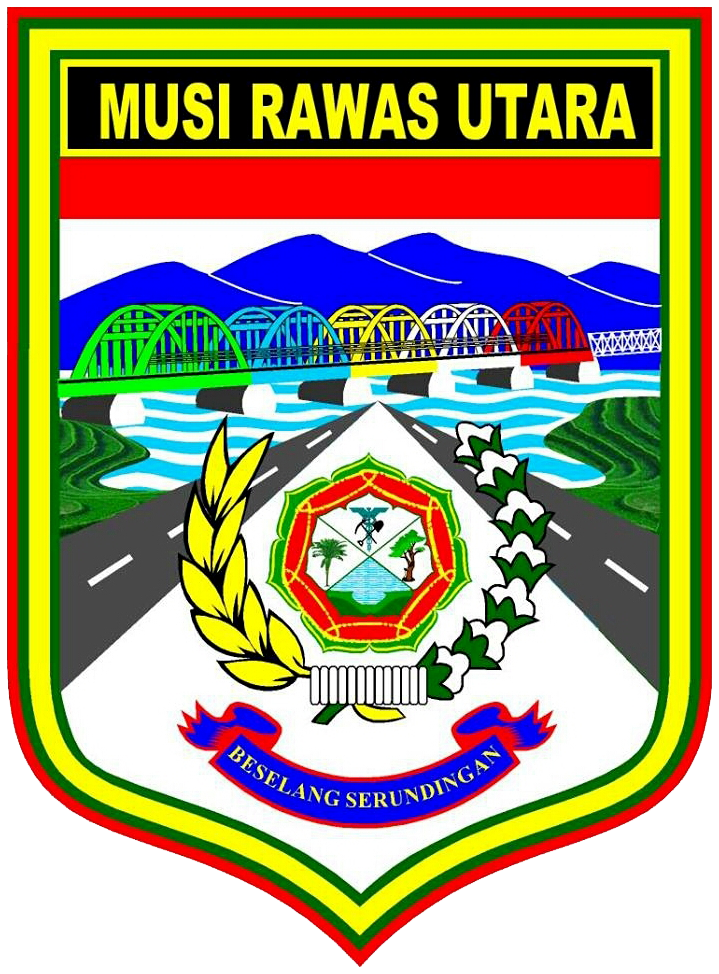
North Musi Rawas Regency

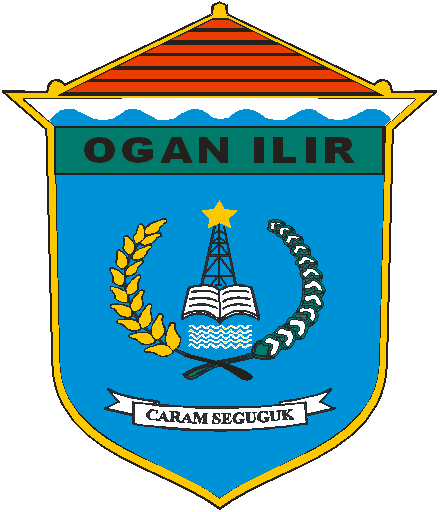
Ogan Ilir Regency

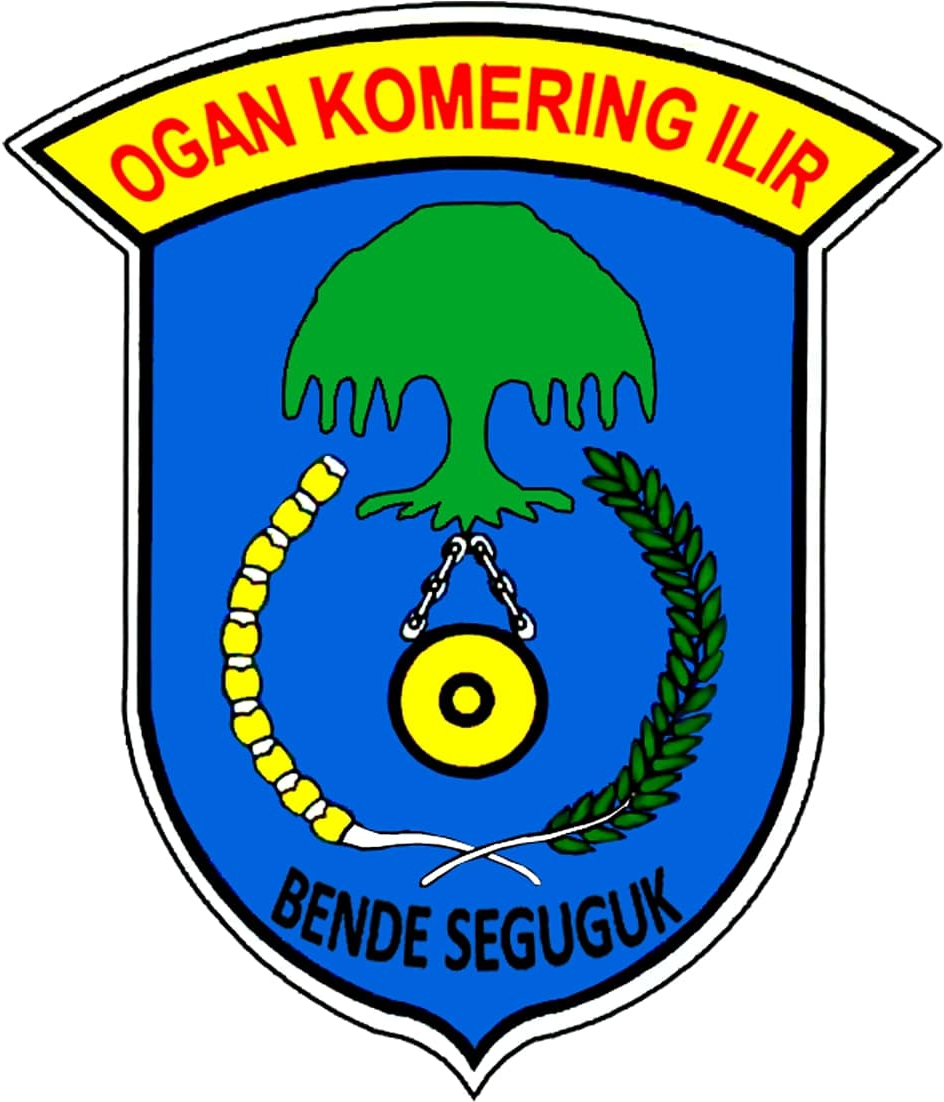
Ogan Komering Ilir Regency

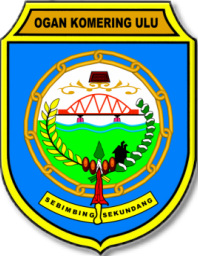
Ogan Komering Ulu Regency

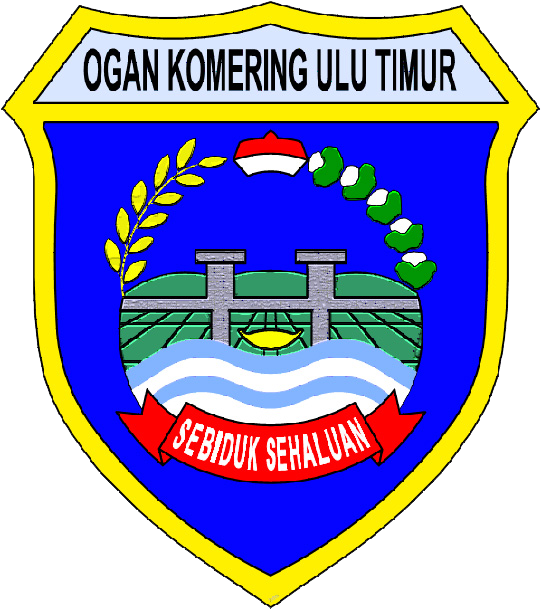
East Ogan Komering Ulu Regency

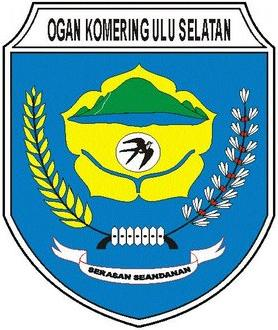
South Ogan Komering Ulu Regency

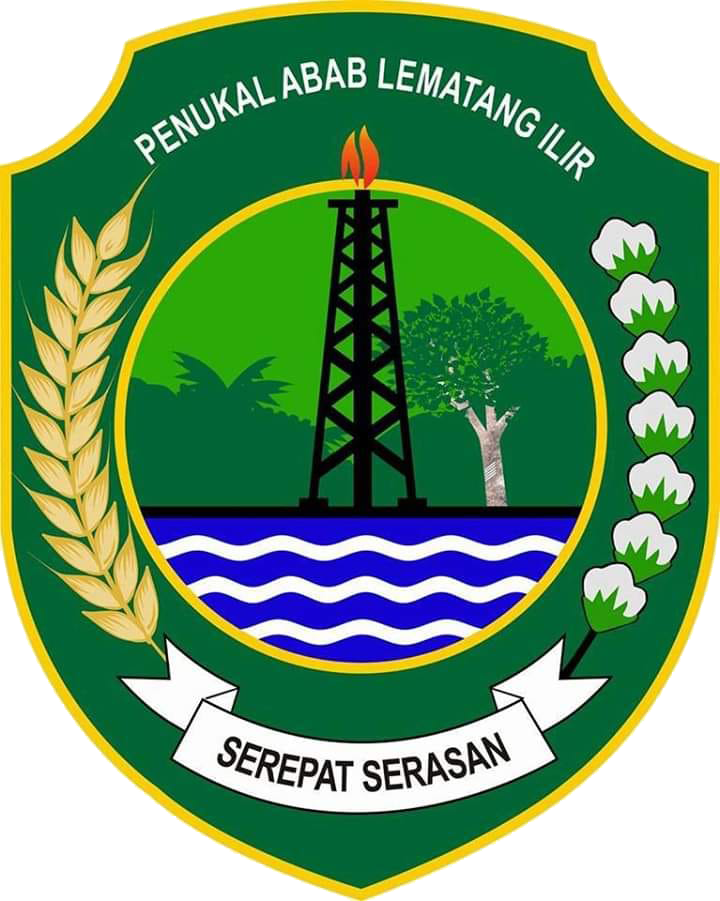
Penukal Abab Lematang Ilir Regency

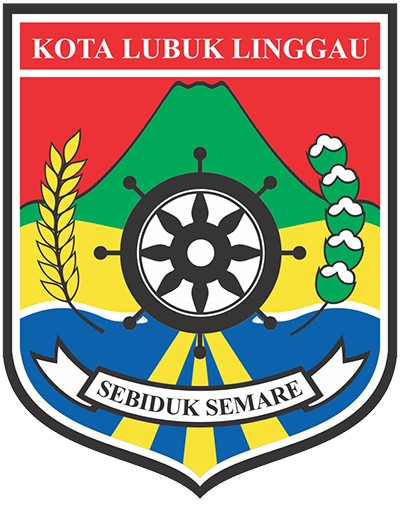
Lubuklinggau City

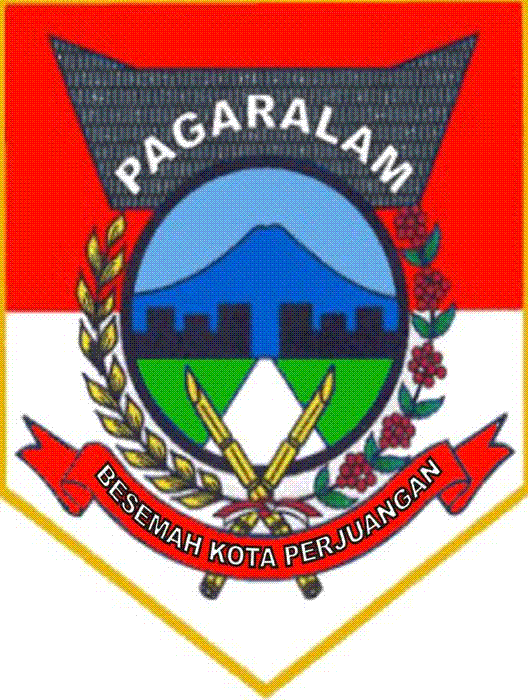
Pagar Alam City

Palembang City

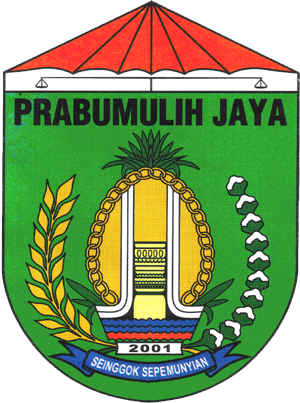
Prabumulih City

=== Bengkulu ===
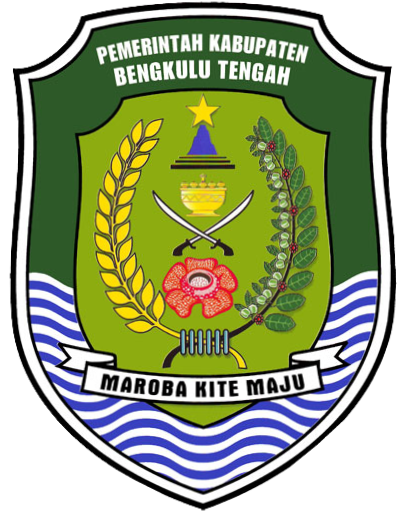
Central Bengkulu Regency

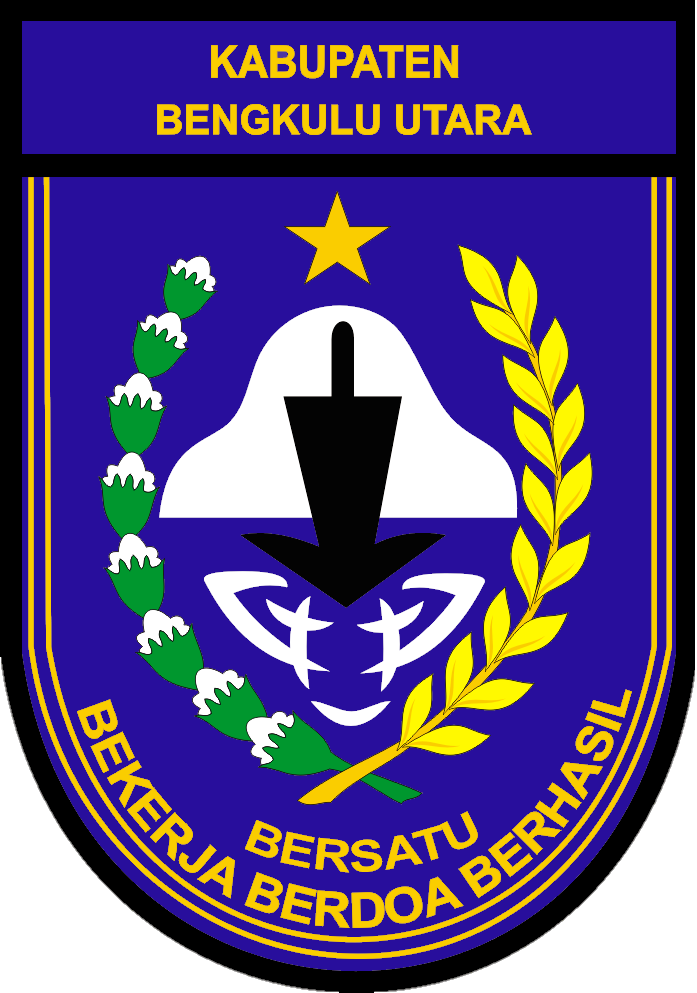
North Bengkulu Regency

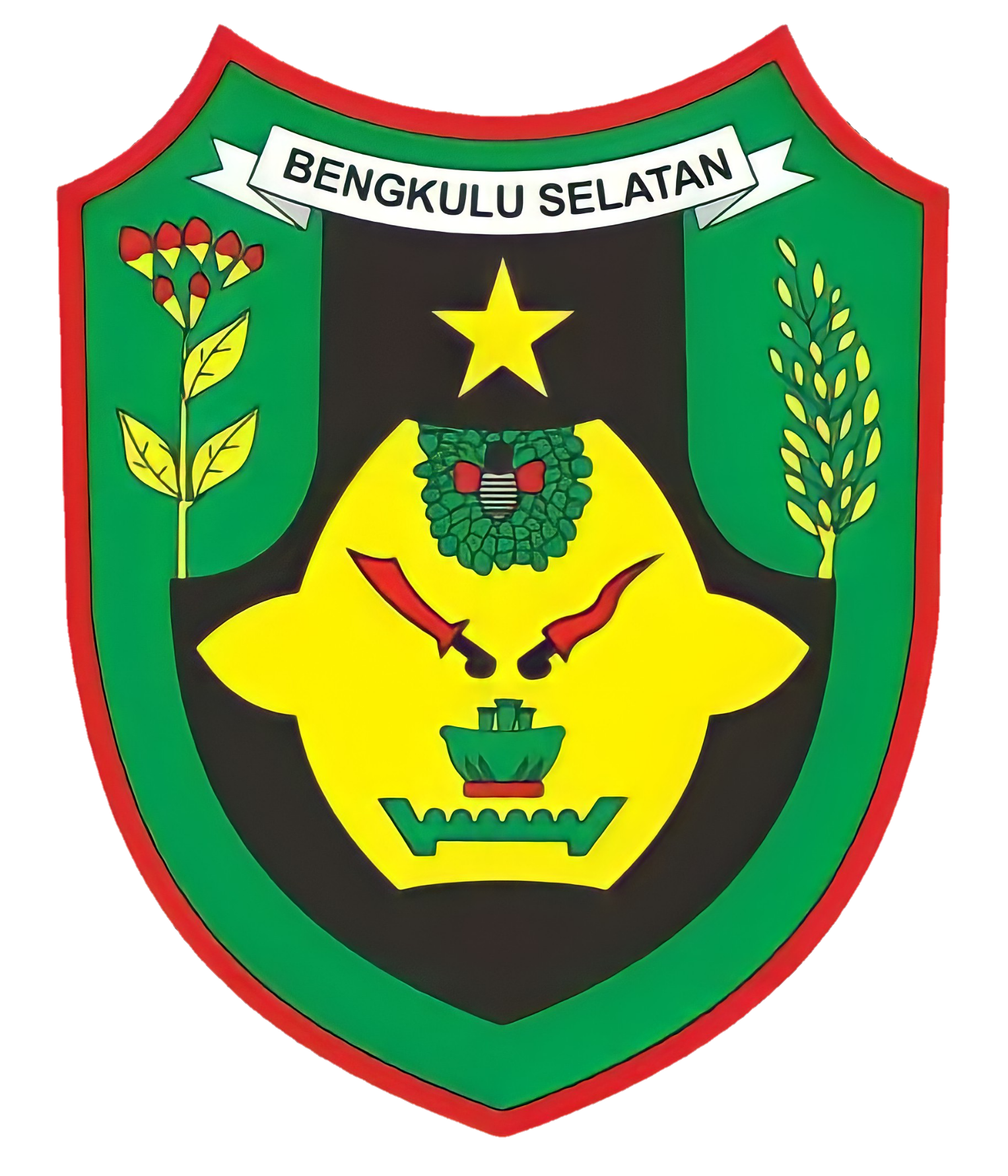
South Bengkulu Regency

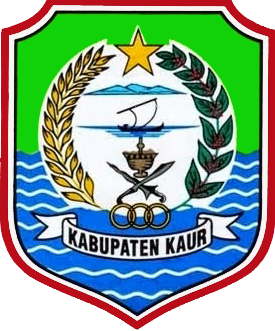
Kaur Regency

Kepahiang Regency

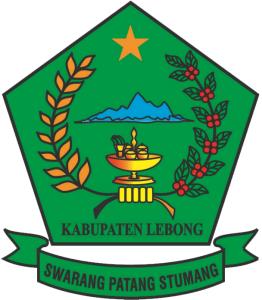
Lebong Regency

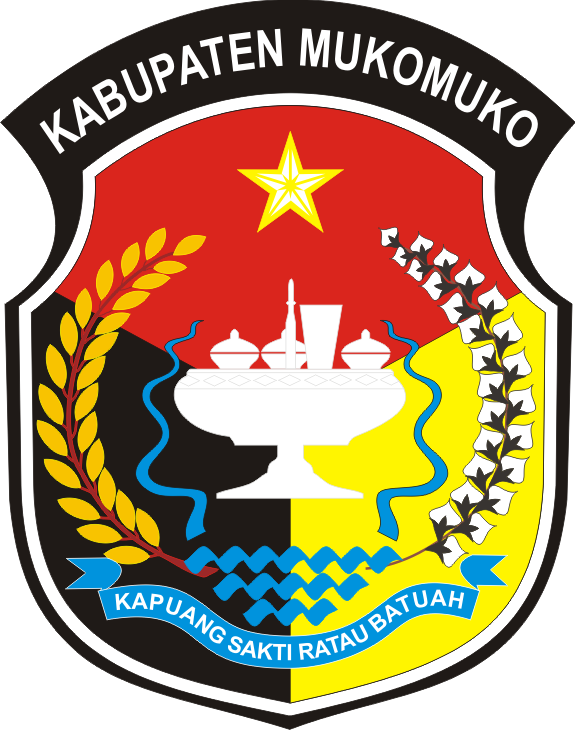
Mukomuko Regency

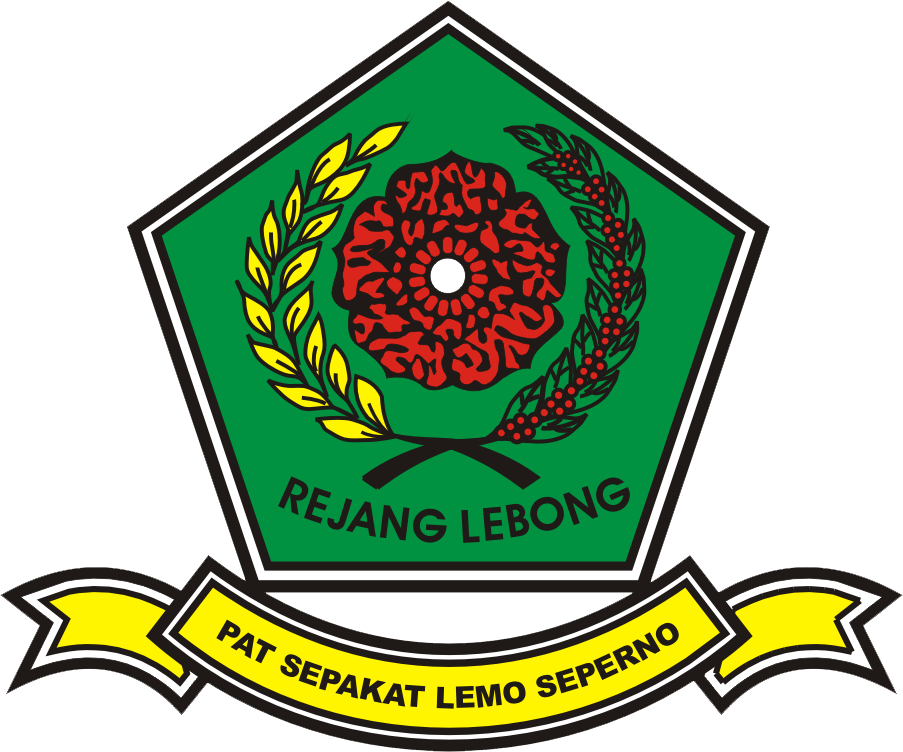
Rejang Lebong Regency

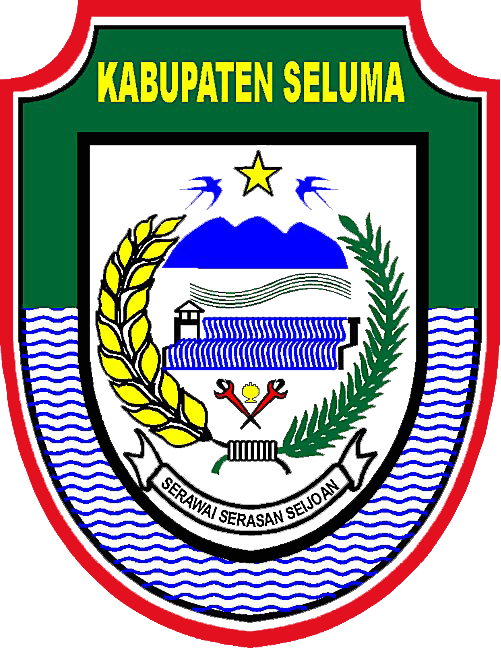
Seluma Regency

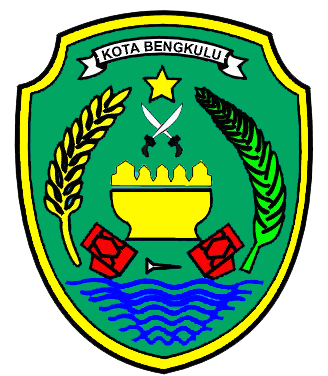
Bengkulu City

=== Bangka Belitung Islands ===
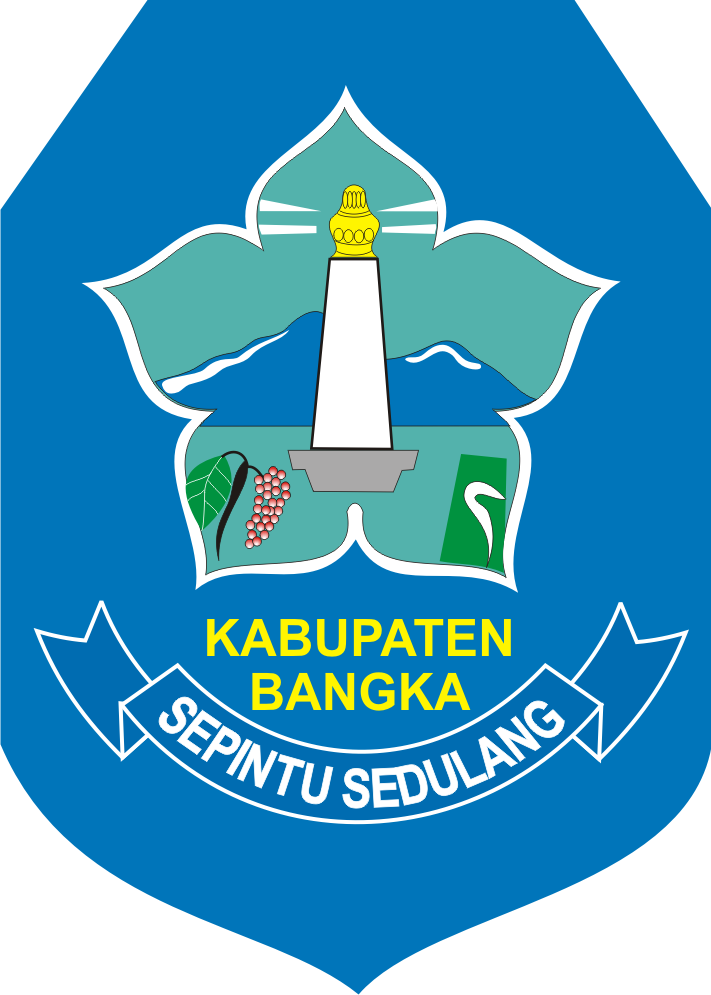
Bangka Regency

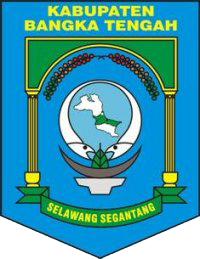
Central Bangka Regency

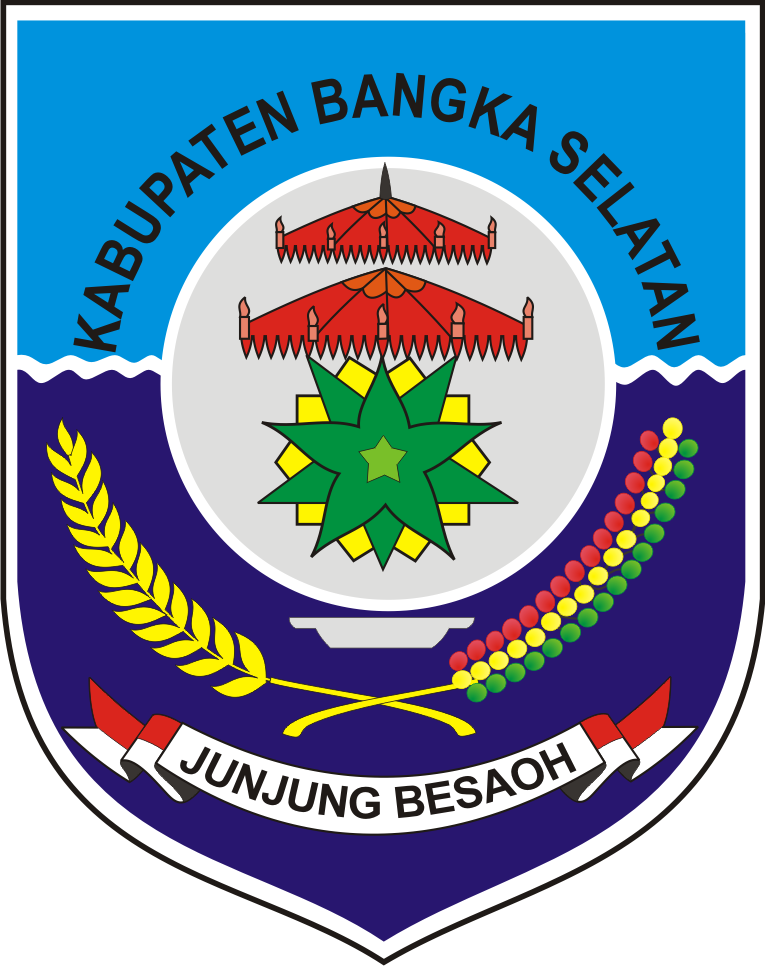
South Bangka Regency

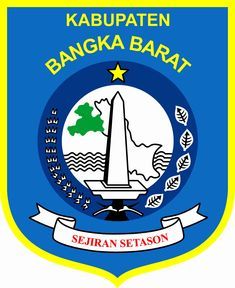
West Bangka Regency

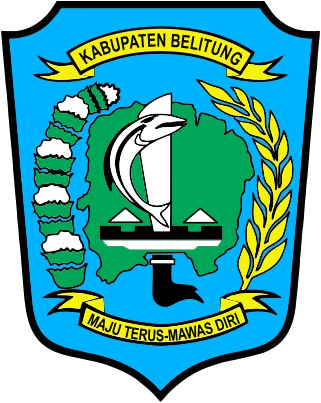
Belitung Regency

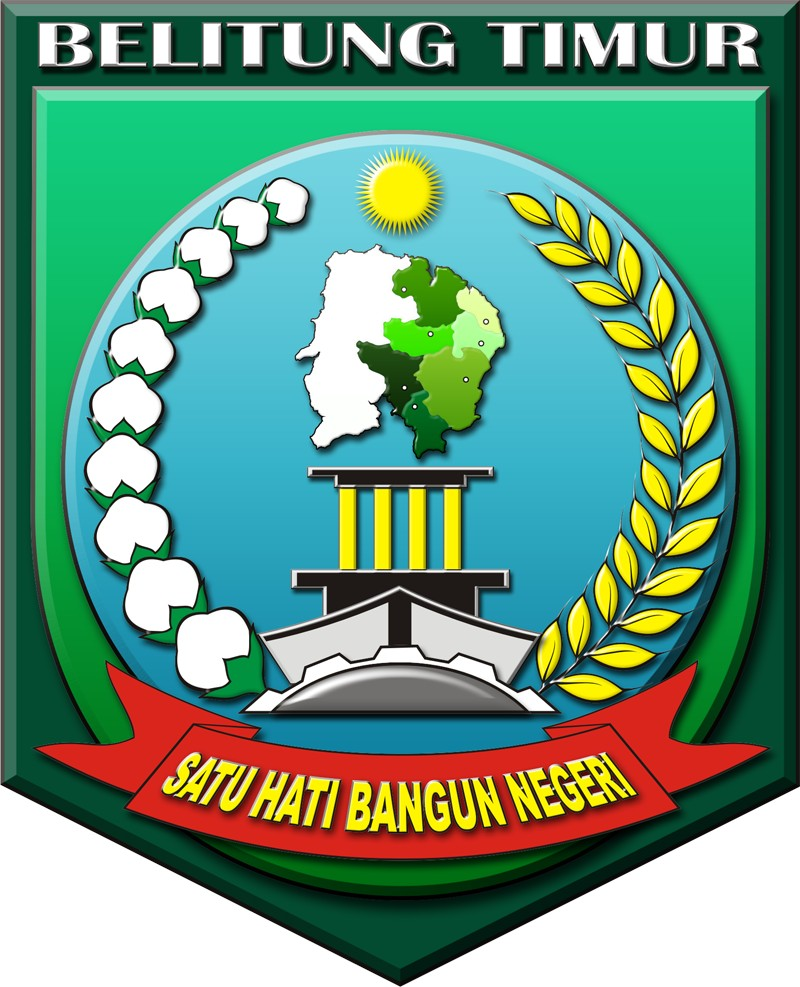
East Belitung Regency

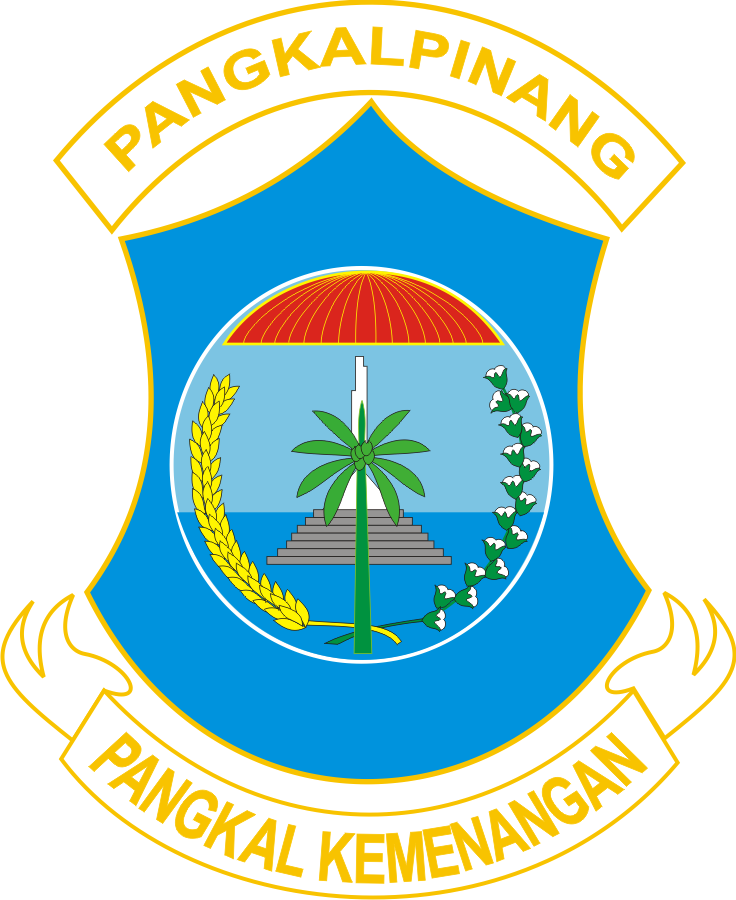
Pangkal Pinang City

=== Lampung ===
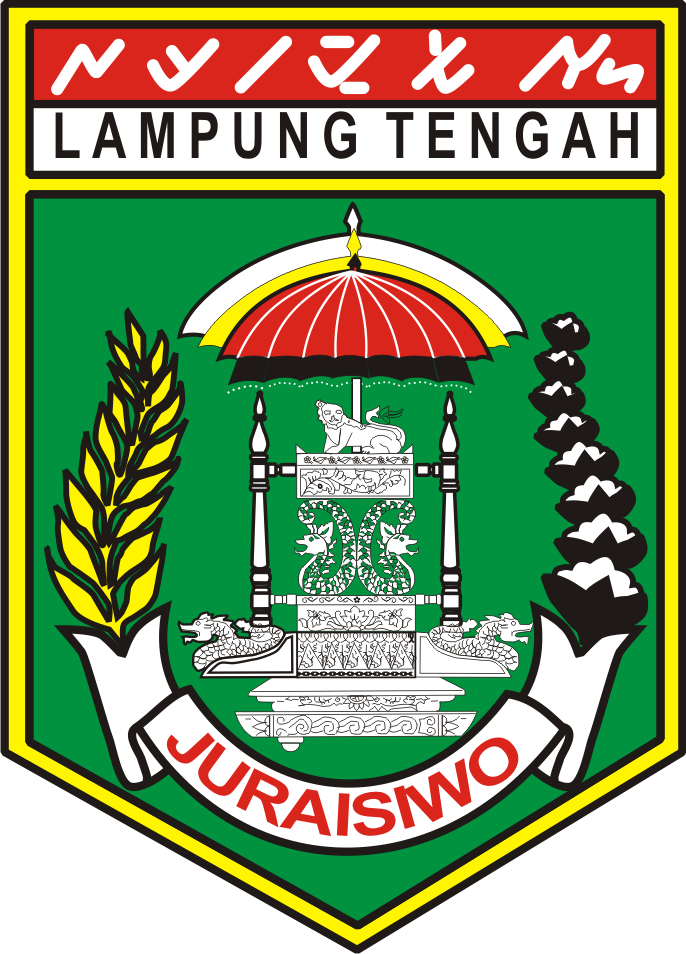
Central Lampung Regency

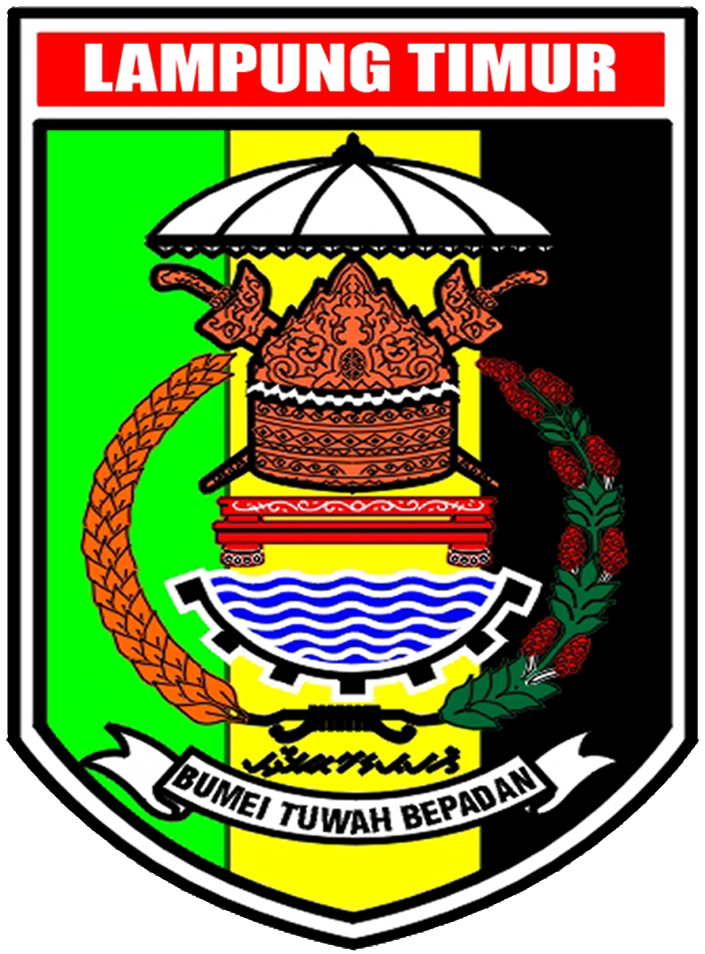
East Lampung Regency

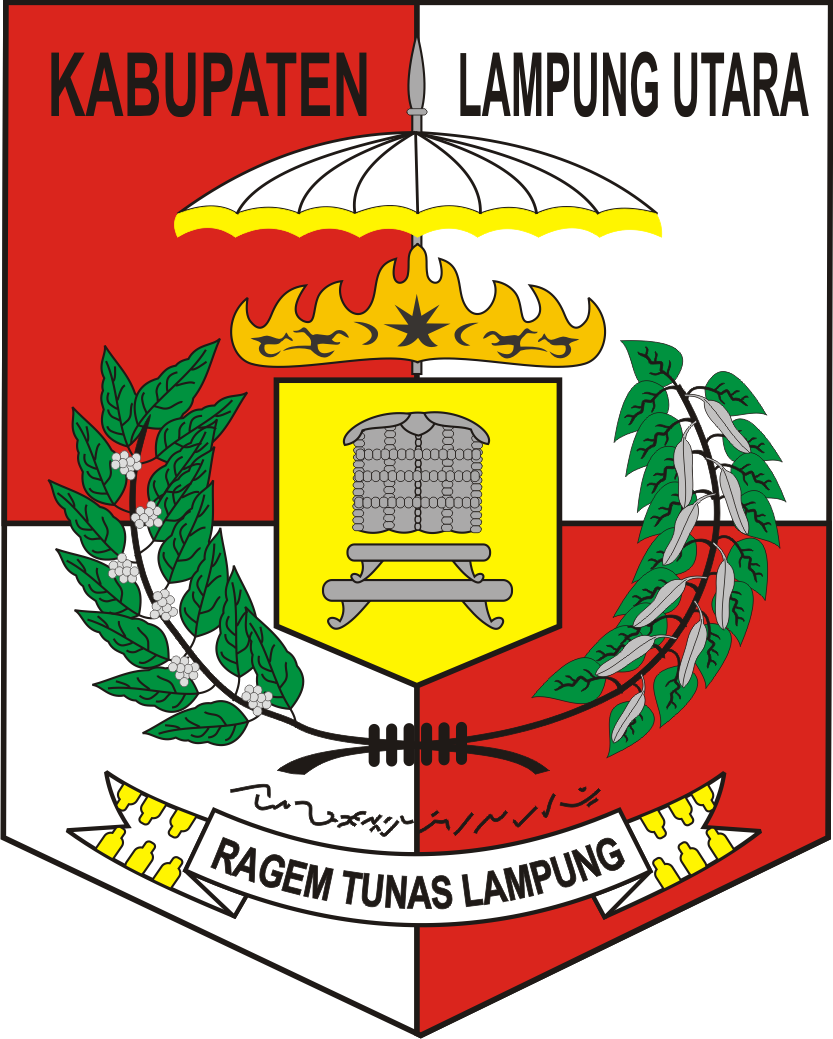
North Lampung Regency

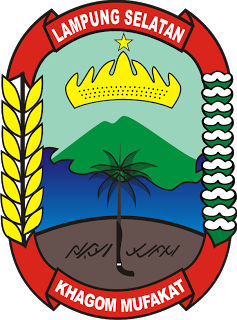
South Lampung Regency

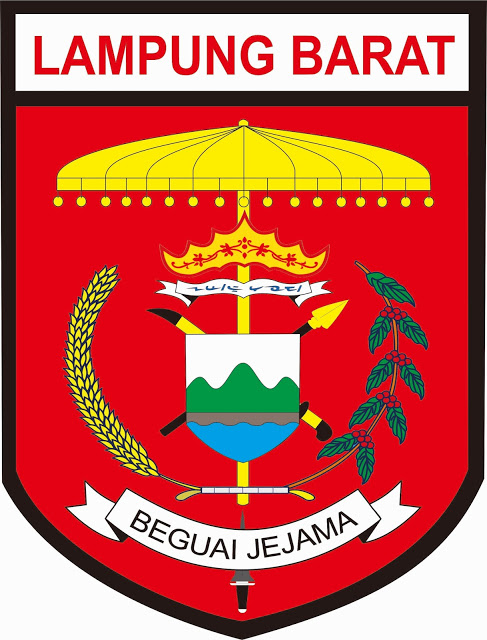
West Lampung Regency

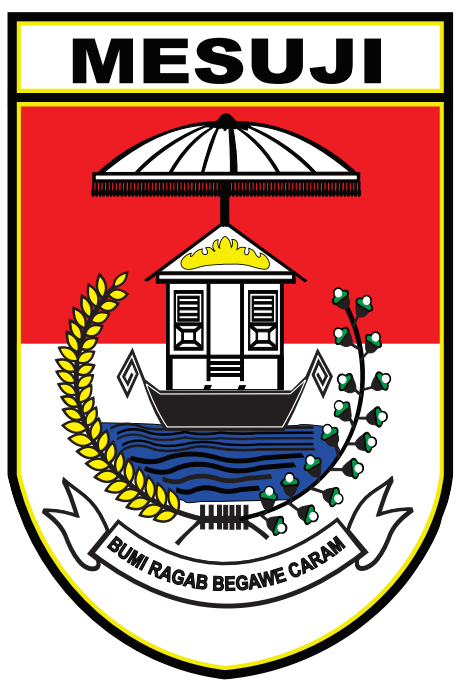
Mesuji Regency

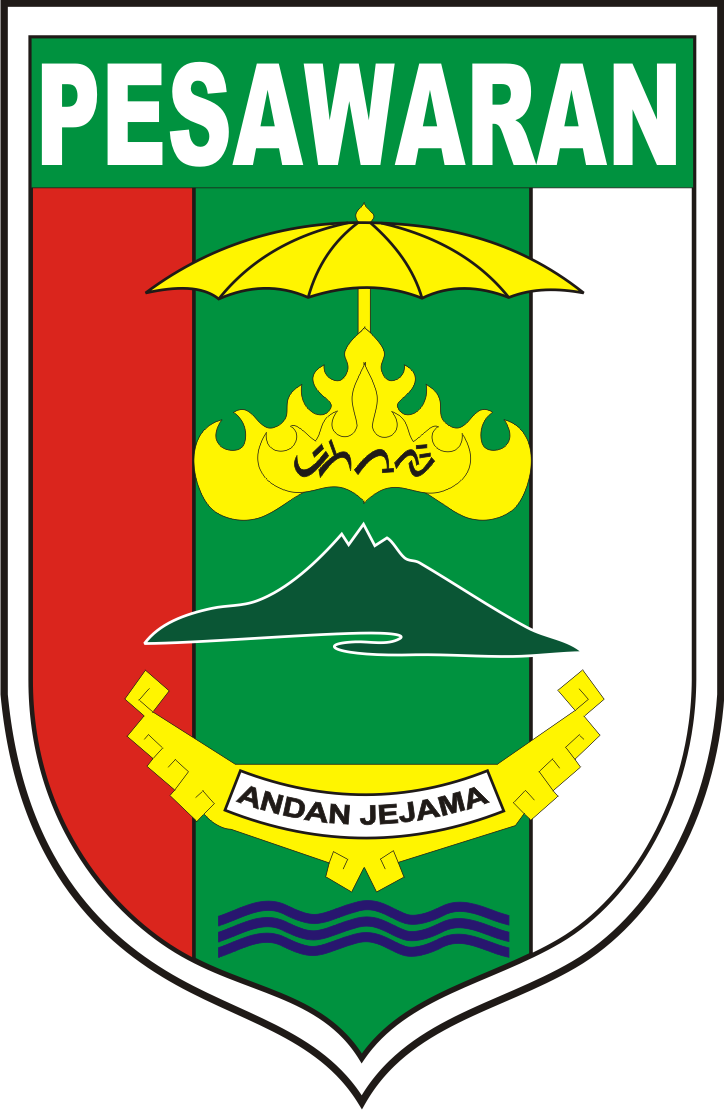
Pesawaran Regency

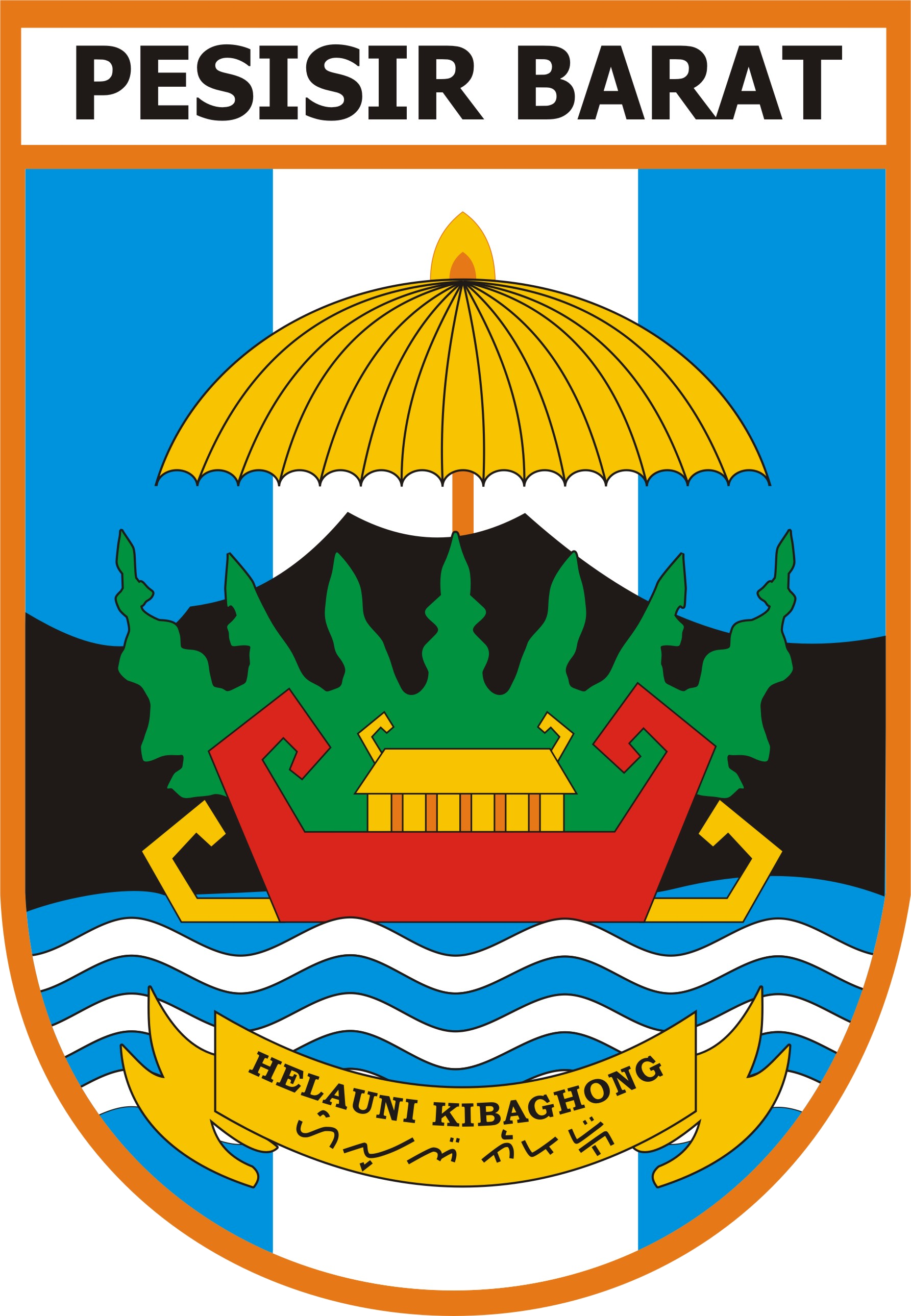
Pesisir Barat Regency

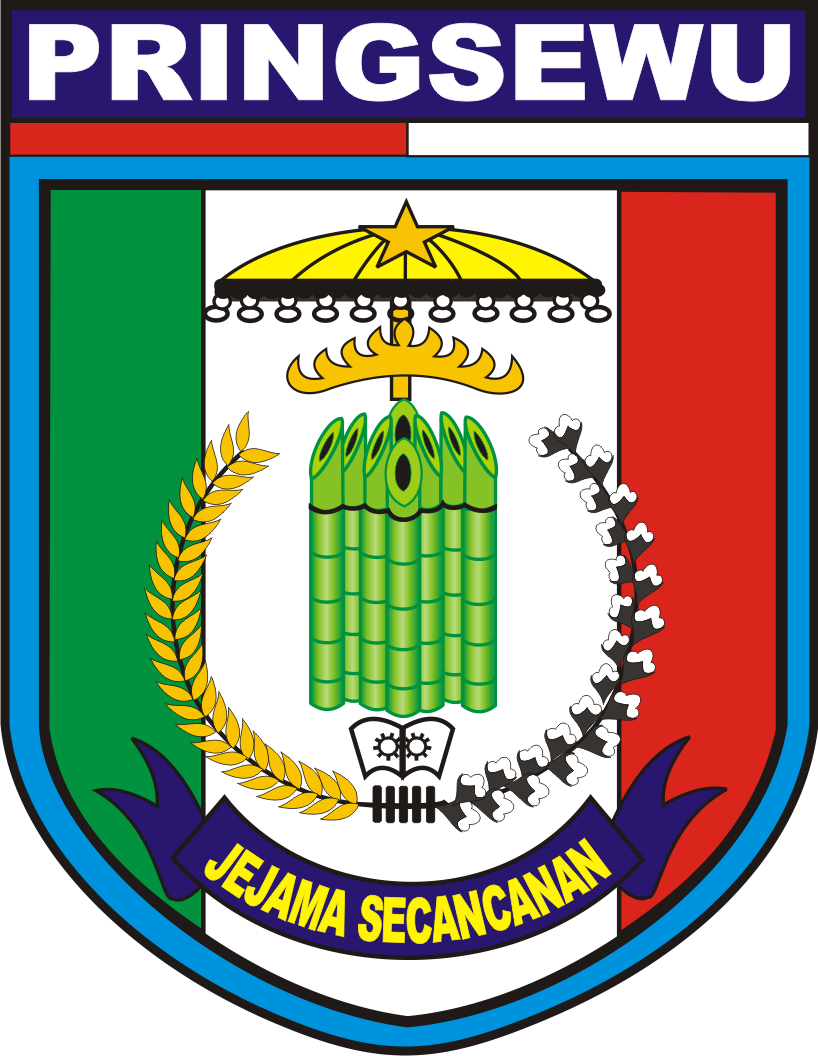
Pringsewu Regency

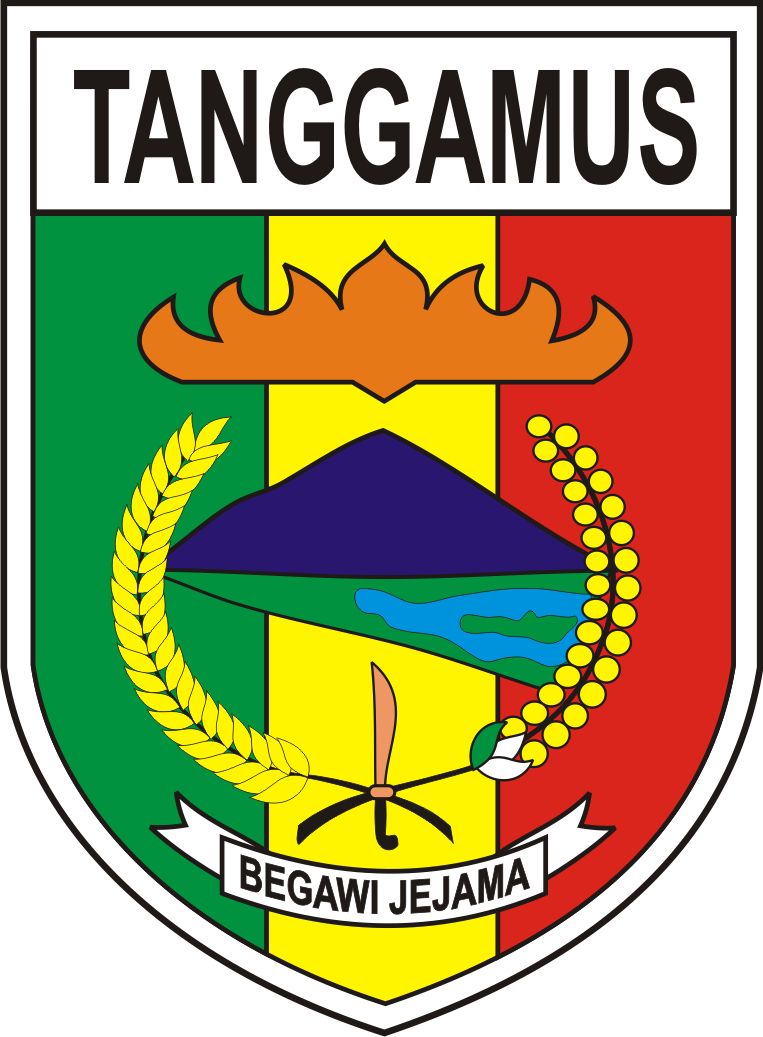
Tanggamus Regency

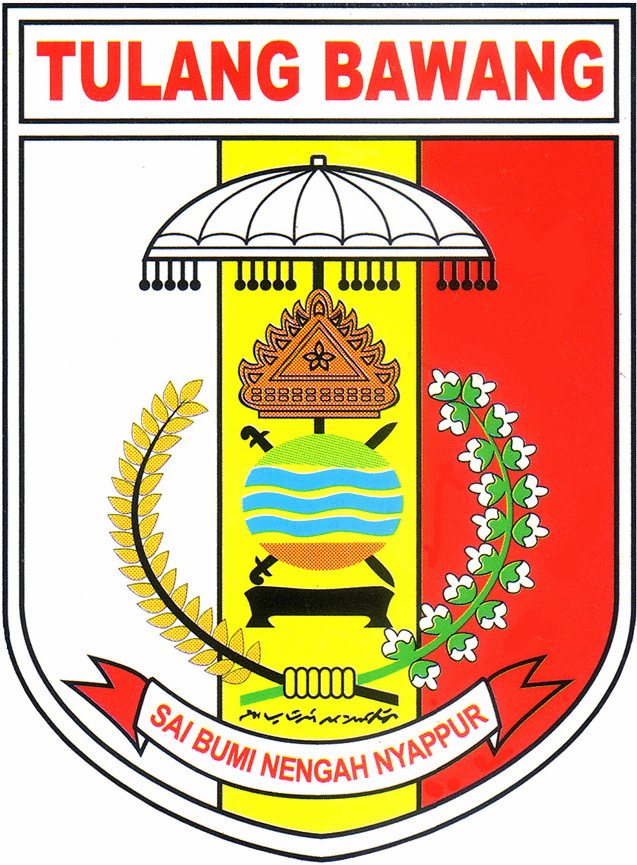
Tulang Bawang Regency

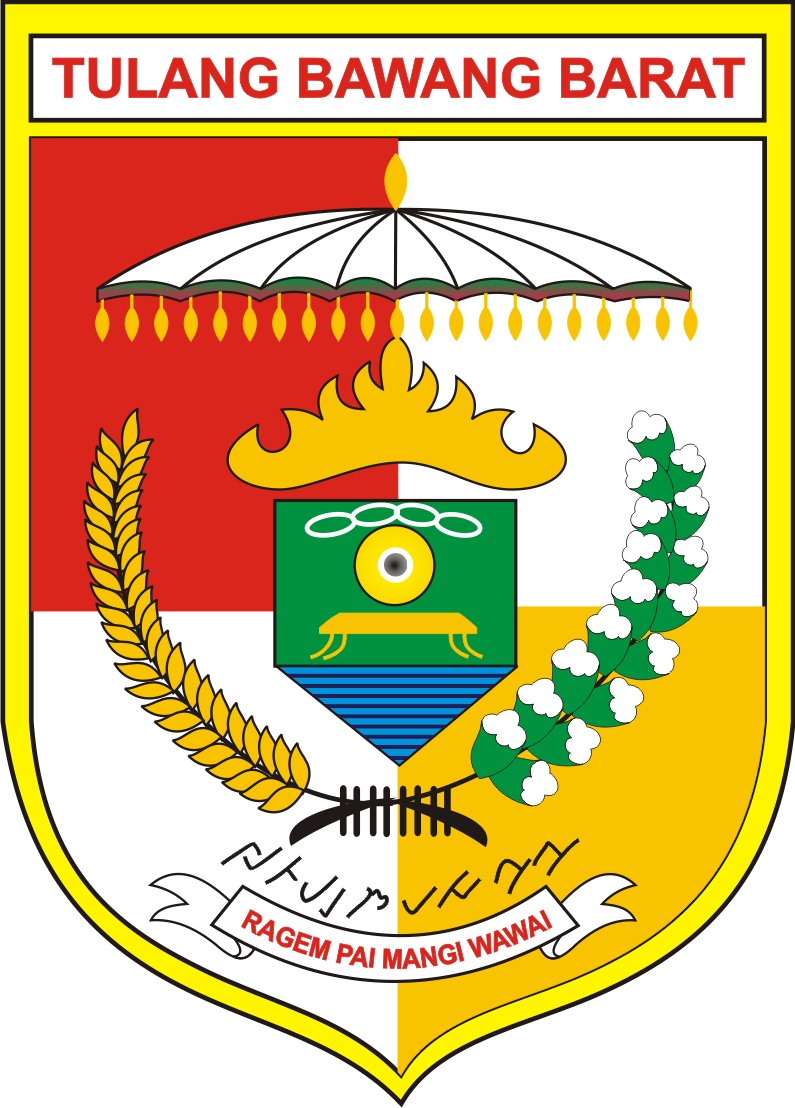
West Tulang Bawang Regency

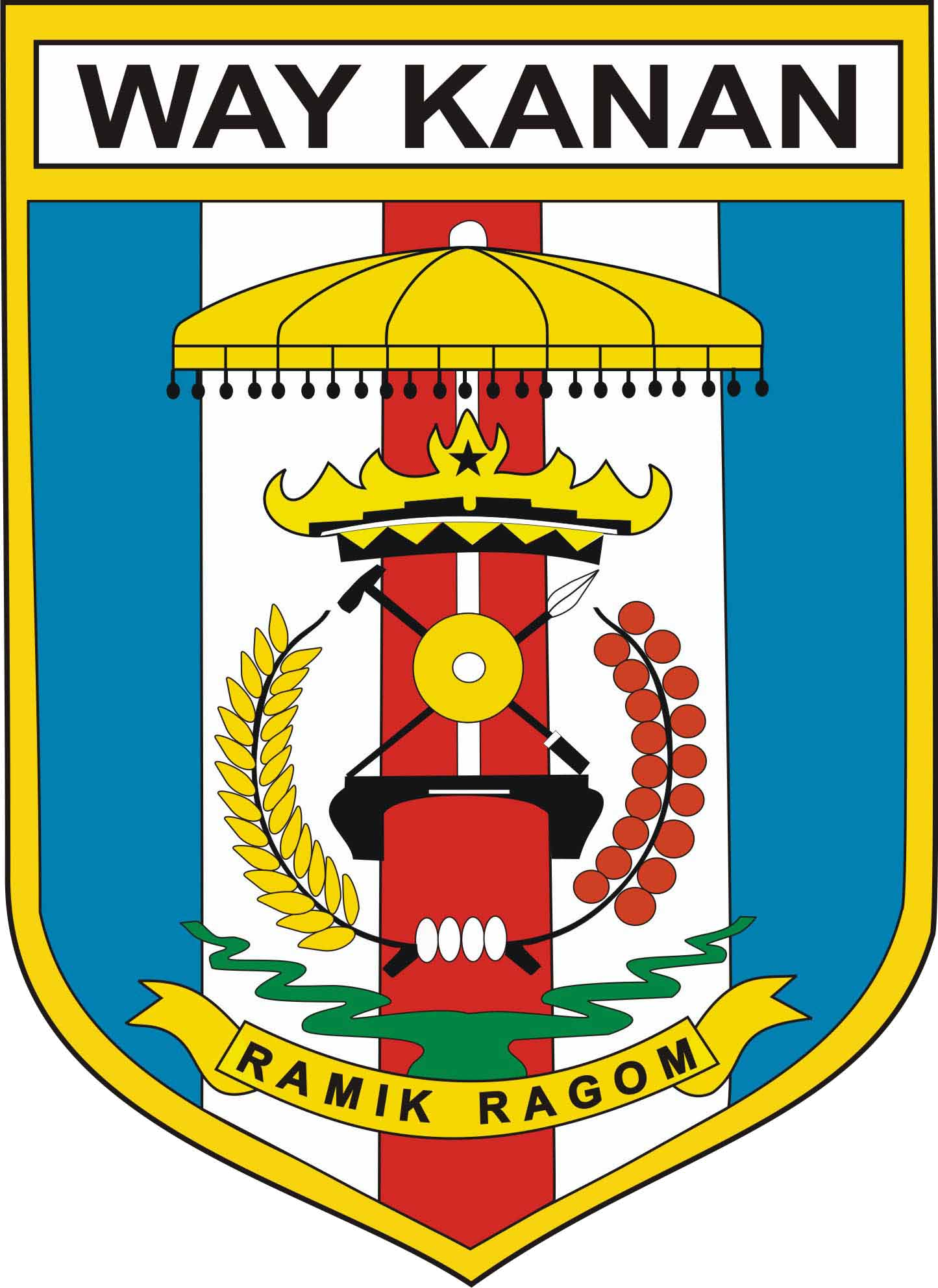
Way Kanan Regency

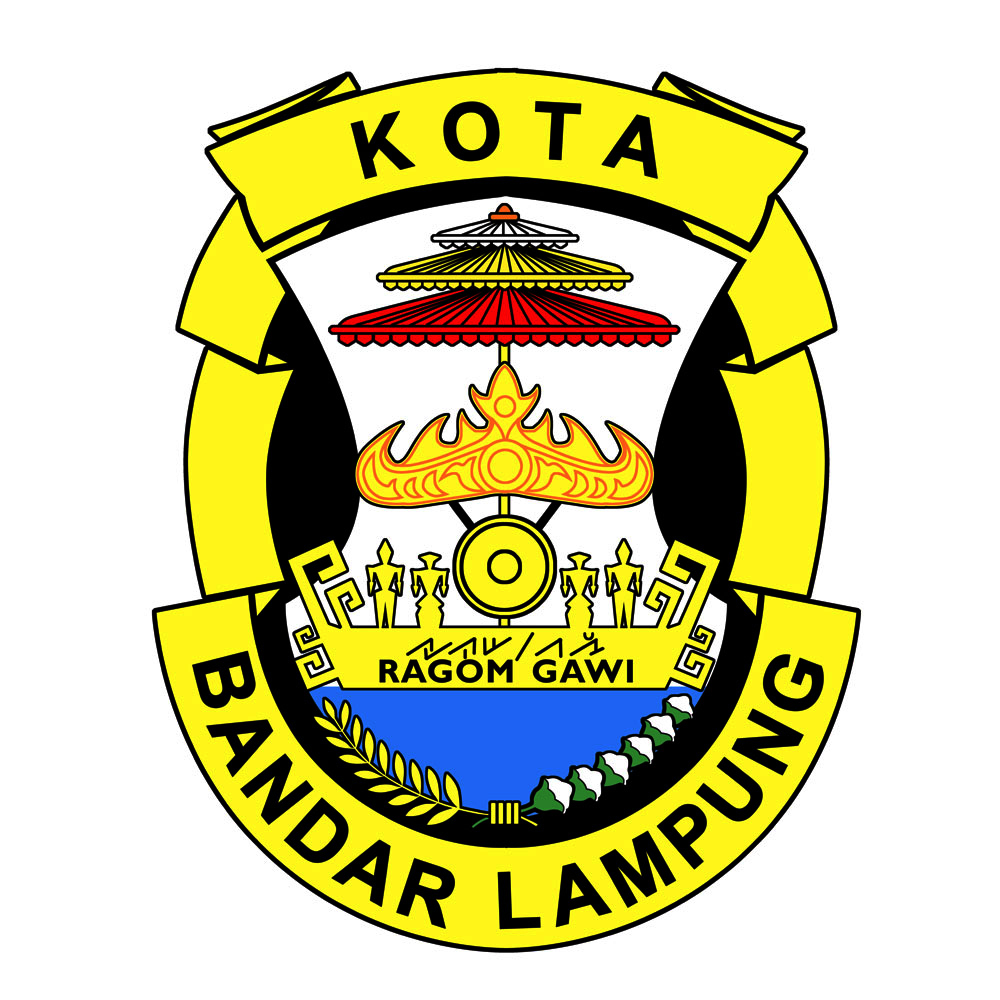
Bandar Lampung City

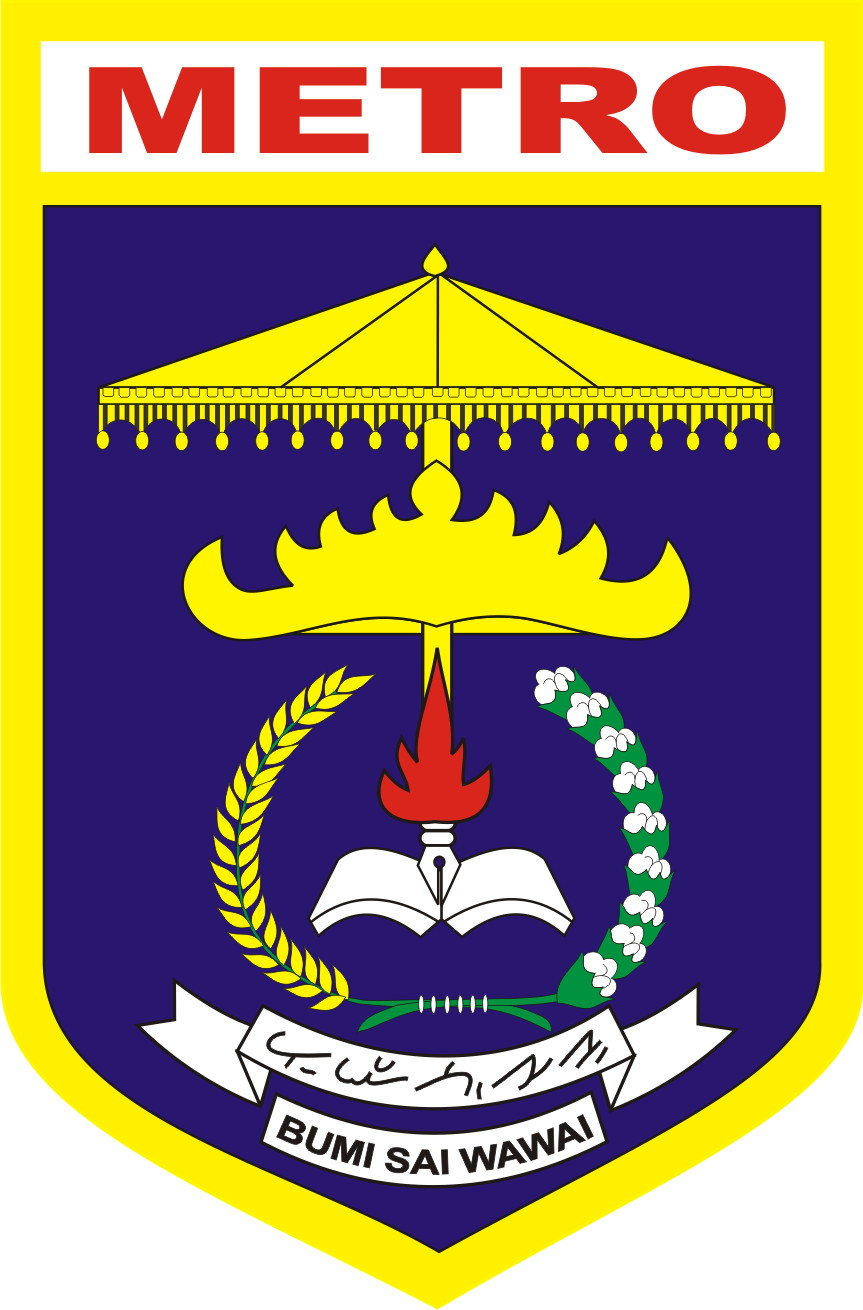
Metro City

=== Banten ===
Lebak Regency

Pandeglang Regency

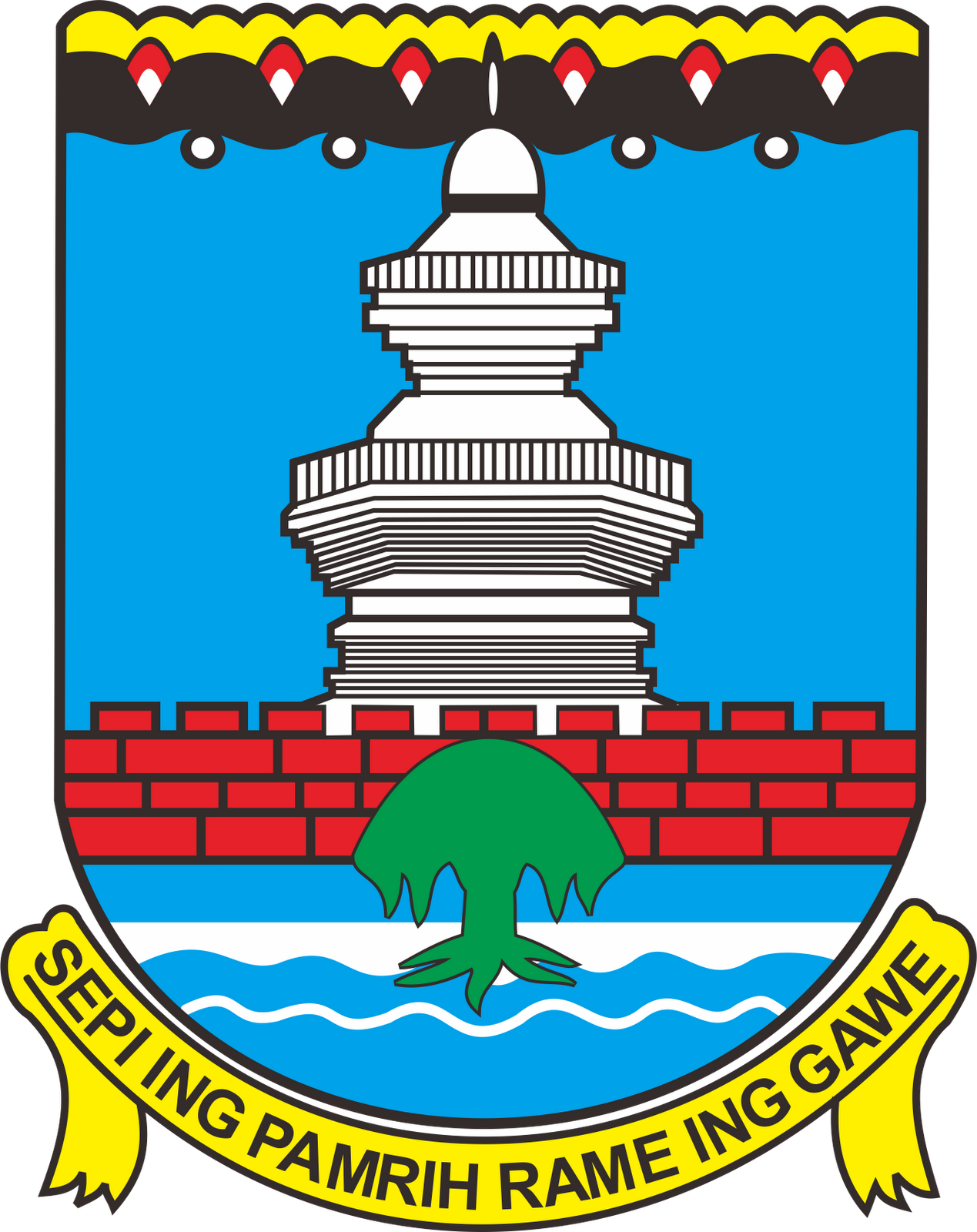
Serang Regency

Tangerang Regency

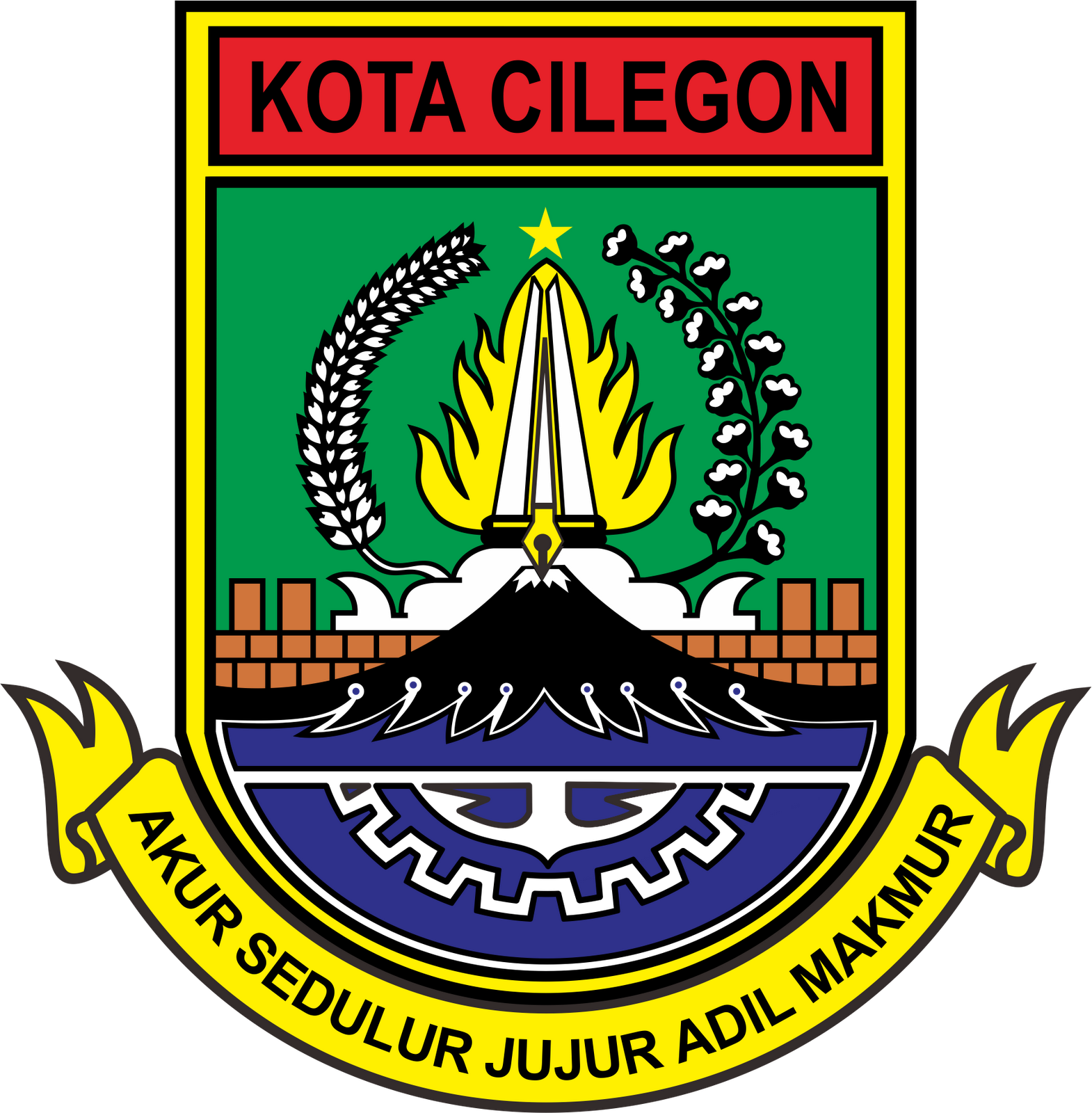
Cilegon City

Serang City

Tangerang City

South Tangerang City

=== Jakarta ===
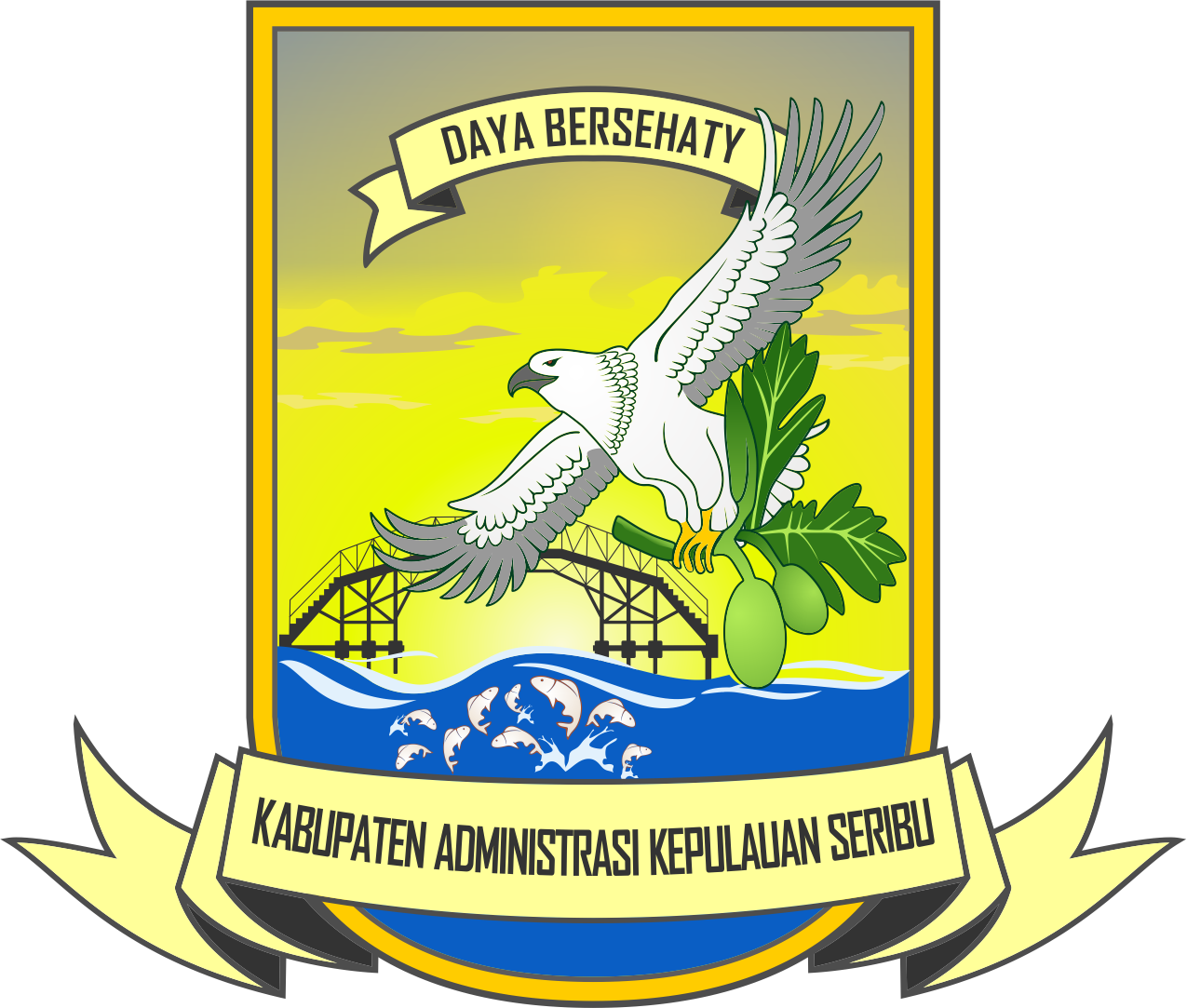
Kepulauan Seribu Administrative Regency

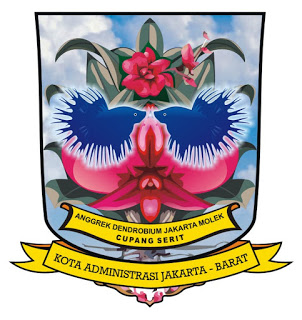
West Jakarta Administrative City

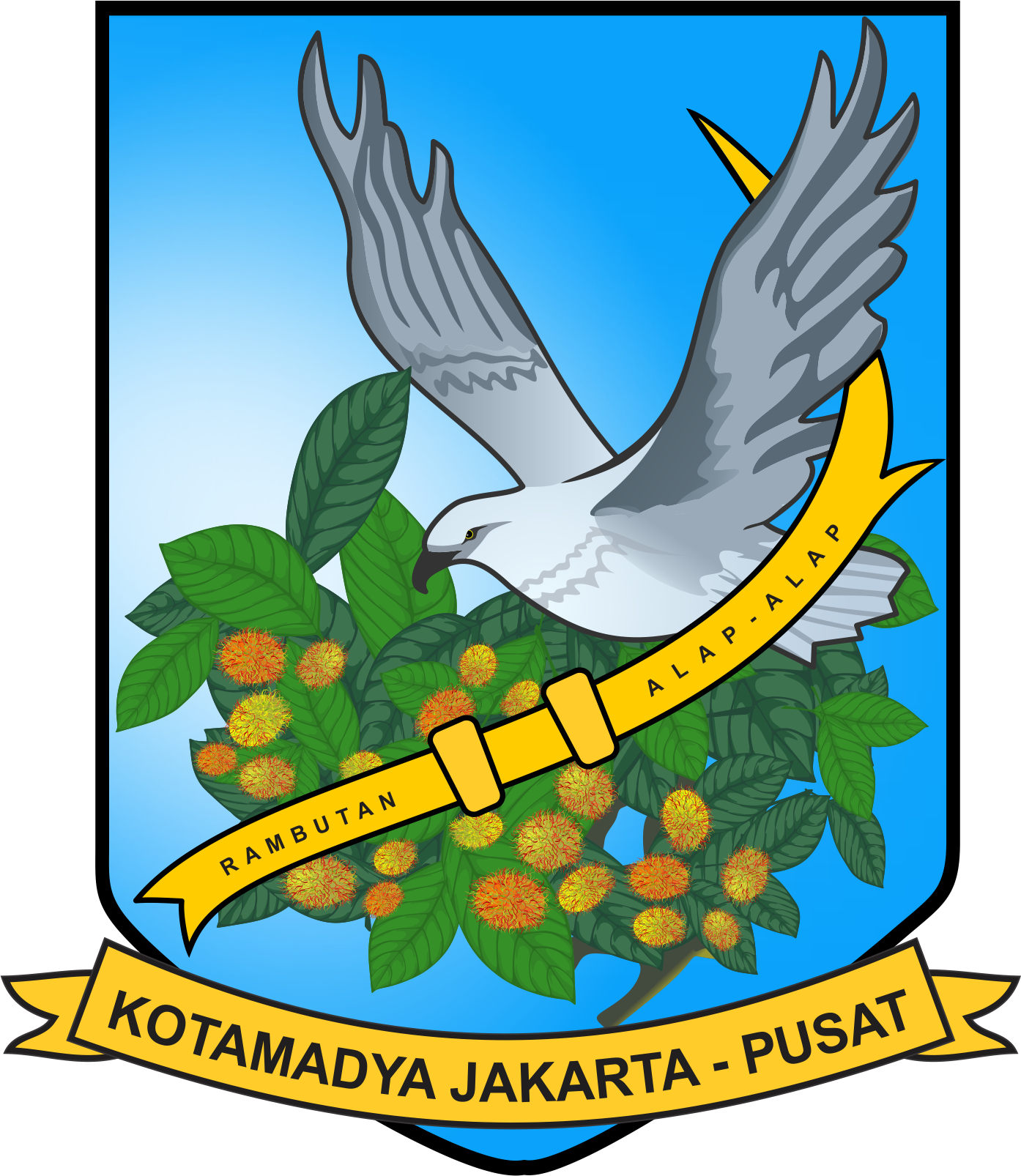
Central Jakarta Administrative City

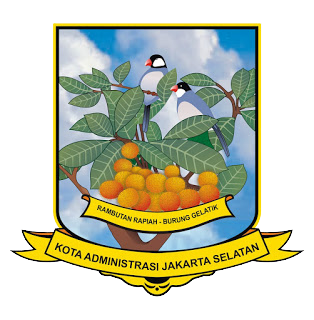
South Jakarta Administrative City

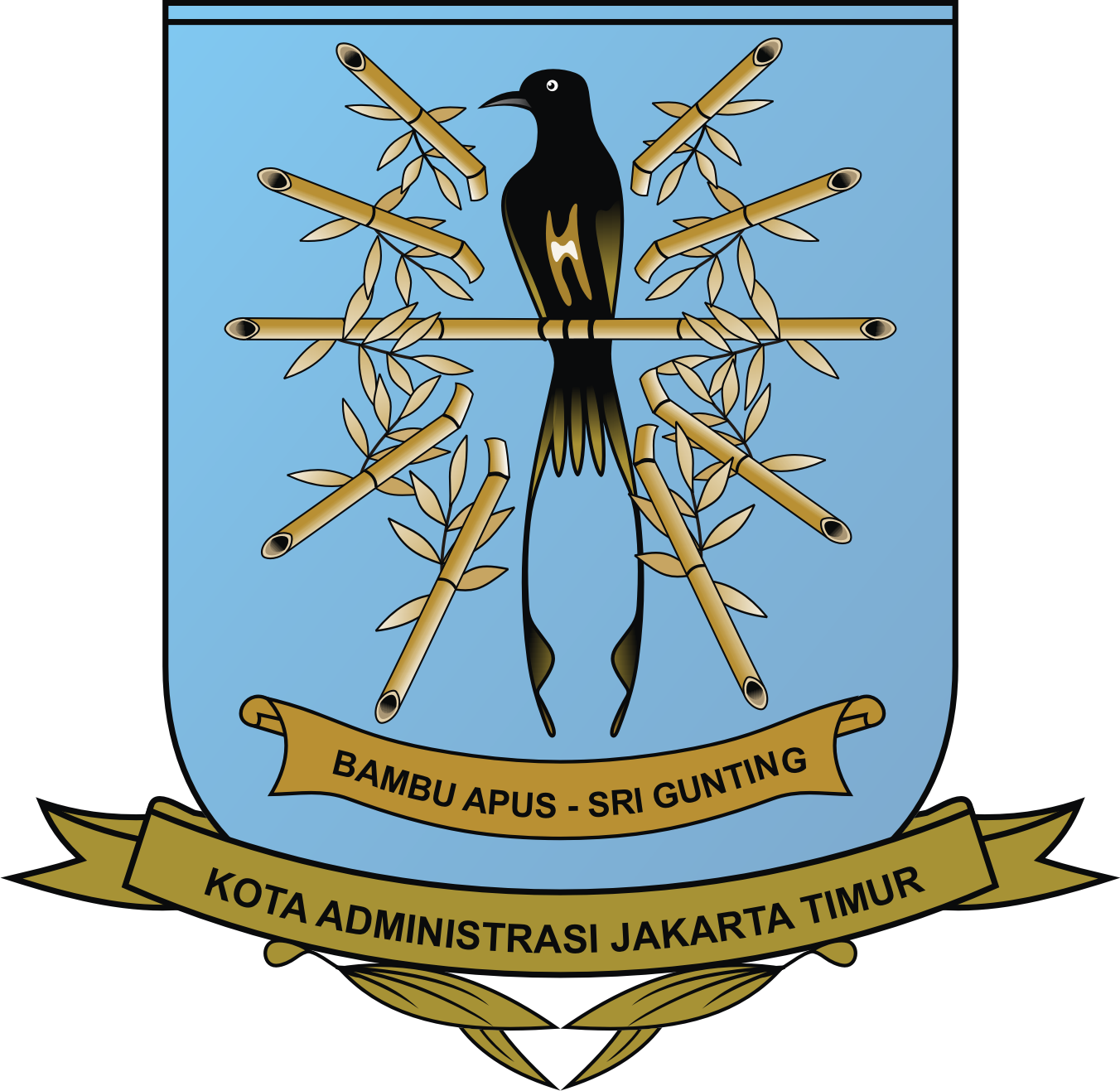
East Jakarta Administrative City

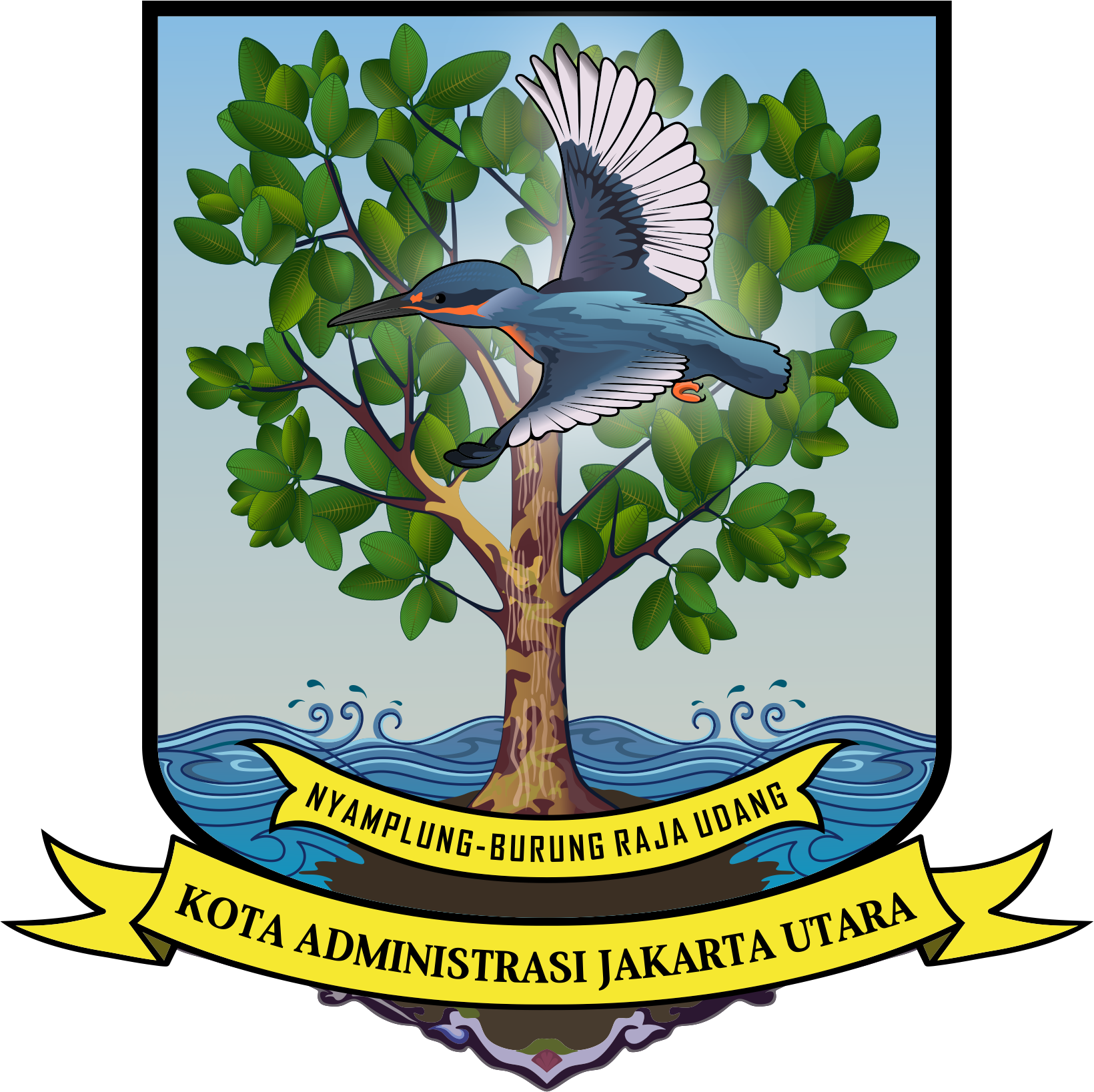
North Jakarta Administrative City

=== West Java ===
Bandung Regency

West Bandung Regency

Bekasi Regency

Bogor Regency

Ciamis Regency

Cianjur Regency

Cirebon Regency

Garut Regency

Indramayu Regency

Karawang Regency

Kuningan Regency

Majalengka Regency

Pangandaran Regency

Purwakarta Regency

Subang Regency

Sukabumi Regency

Sumedang Regency

Tasikmalaya Regency

Bandung City

Banjar City

Bekasi City

Bogor City

Cimahi City

Cirebon City

Depok City

Sukabumi City

Tasikmalaya City

=== Central Java ===
Banjarnegara Regency

Banyumas Regency

Batang Regency

Blora Regency

Boyolali Regency

Brebes Regency

Cilacap Regency

Demak Regency

Grobogan Regency

Jepara Regency

Karanganyar Regency

Kebumen Regency

Kendal Regency

Klaten Regency

Kudus Regency

Magelang Regency

Pati Regency

Pekalongan Regency

Pemalang Regency

Purbalingga Regency

Purworejo Regency

Rembang Regency

Semarang Regency

Sragen Regency

Sukoharjo Regency

Tegal Regency

Temanggung Regency

Wonogiri Regency

Wonosobo Regency

Magelang City

Pekalongan City

Salatiga City

Semarang City

Surakarta (Solo) City

Tegal City

=== Special Region of Yogyakarta ===
Bantul Regency

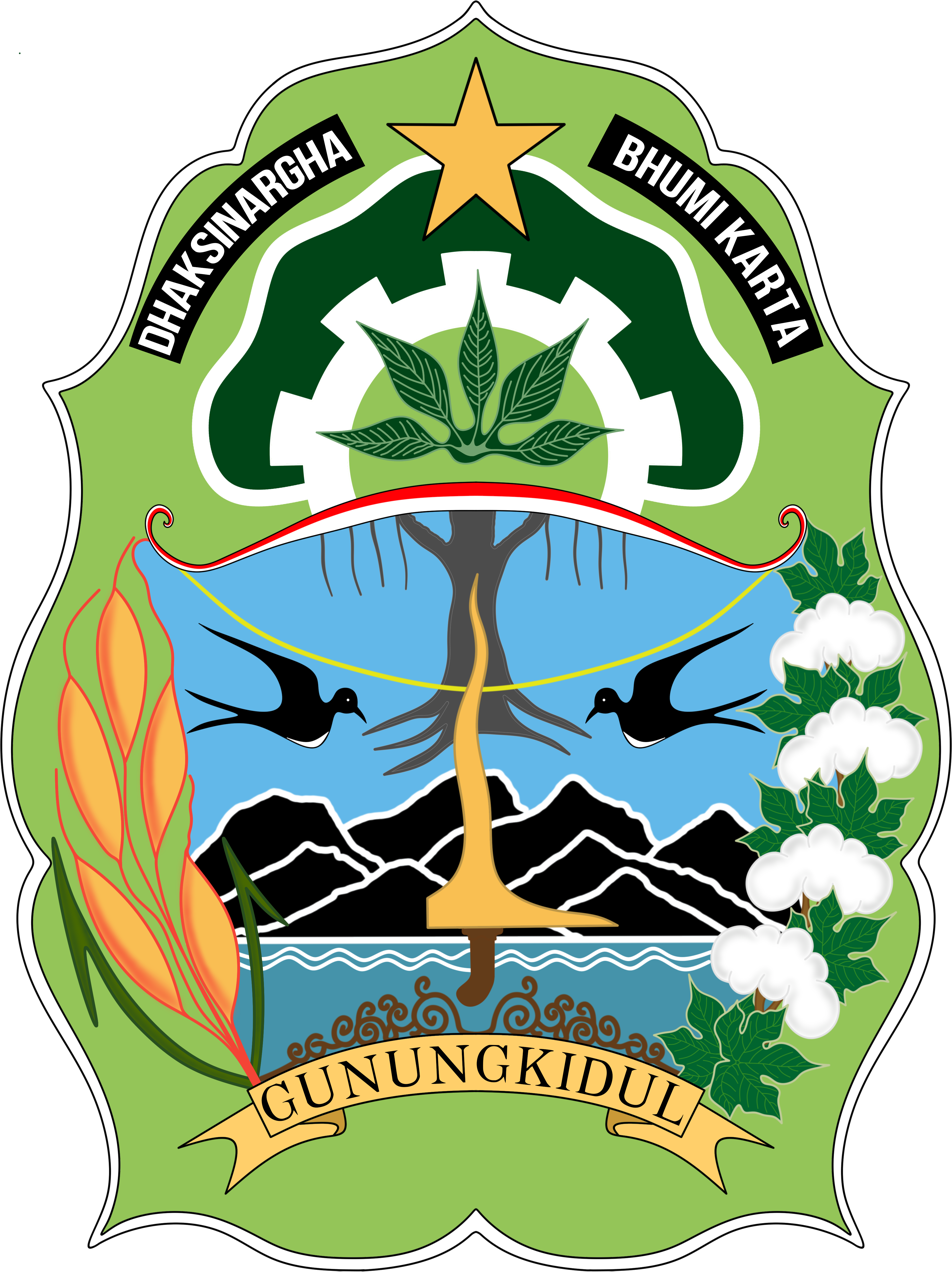
Gunung Kidul Regency

Kulon Progo Regency

Sleman Regency

Yogyakarta City

=== East Java ===
Bangkalan Regency

Banyuwangi Regency

Blitar Regency

Bojonegoro Regency

Bondowoso Regency

Gresik Regency

Jember Regency

Jombang Regency

Kediri Regency

Lamongan Regency

Lumajang Regency

Madiun Regency

Magetan Regency

Malang Regency

Mojokerto Regency

Nganjuk Regency

Ngawi Regency

Pacitan Regency

Pamekasan Regency

Pasuruan Regency

Ponorogo Regency

Probolinggo Regency

Sampang Regency

Sidoarjo Regency

Situbondo Regency

Sumenep Regency

Trenggalek Regency

Tuban Regency

Tulungagung Regency

Batu City

Blitar City

Kediri City

Madiun City

Malang City

Mojokerto City

Pasuruan City

Probolinggo City

Surabaya City

=== Bali ===
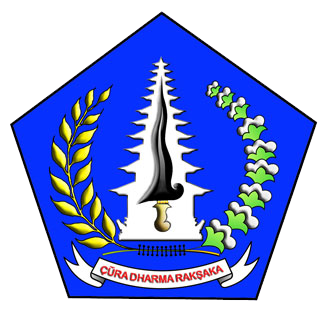
Badung Regency

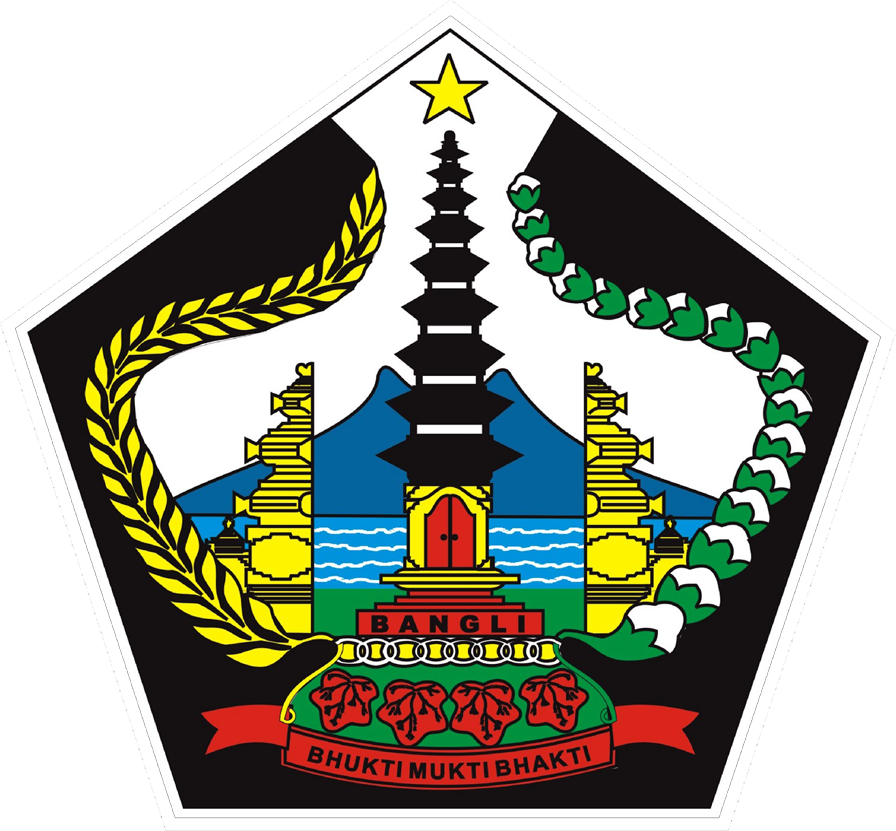
Bangli Regency

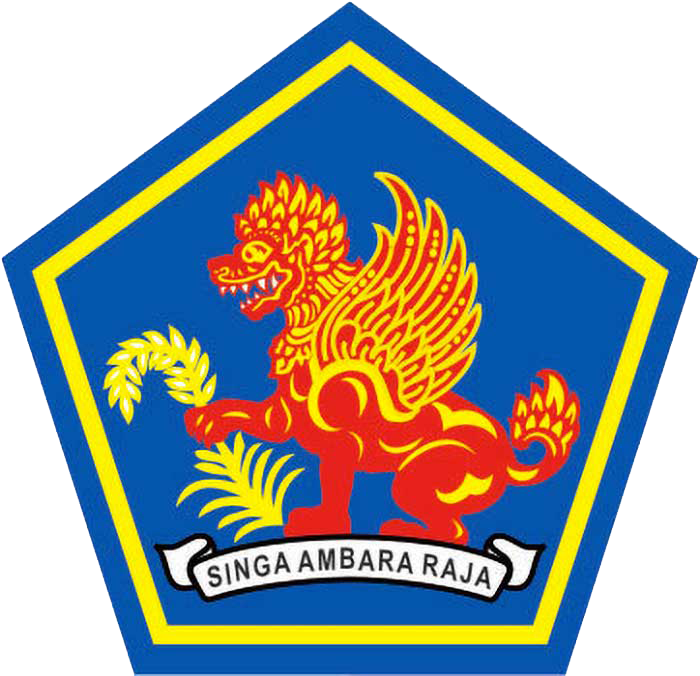
Buleleng Regency

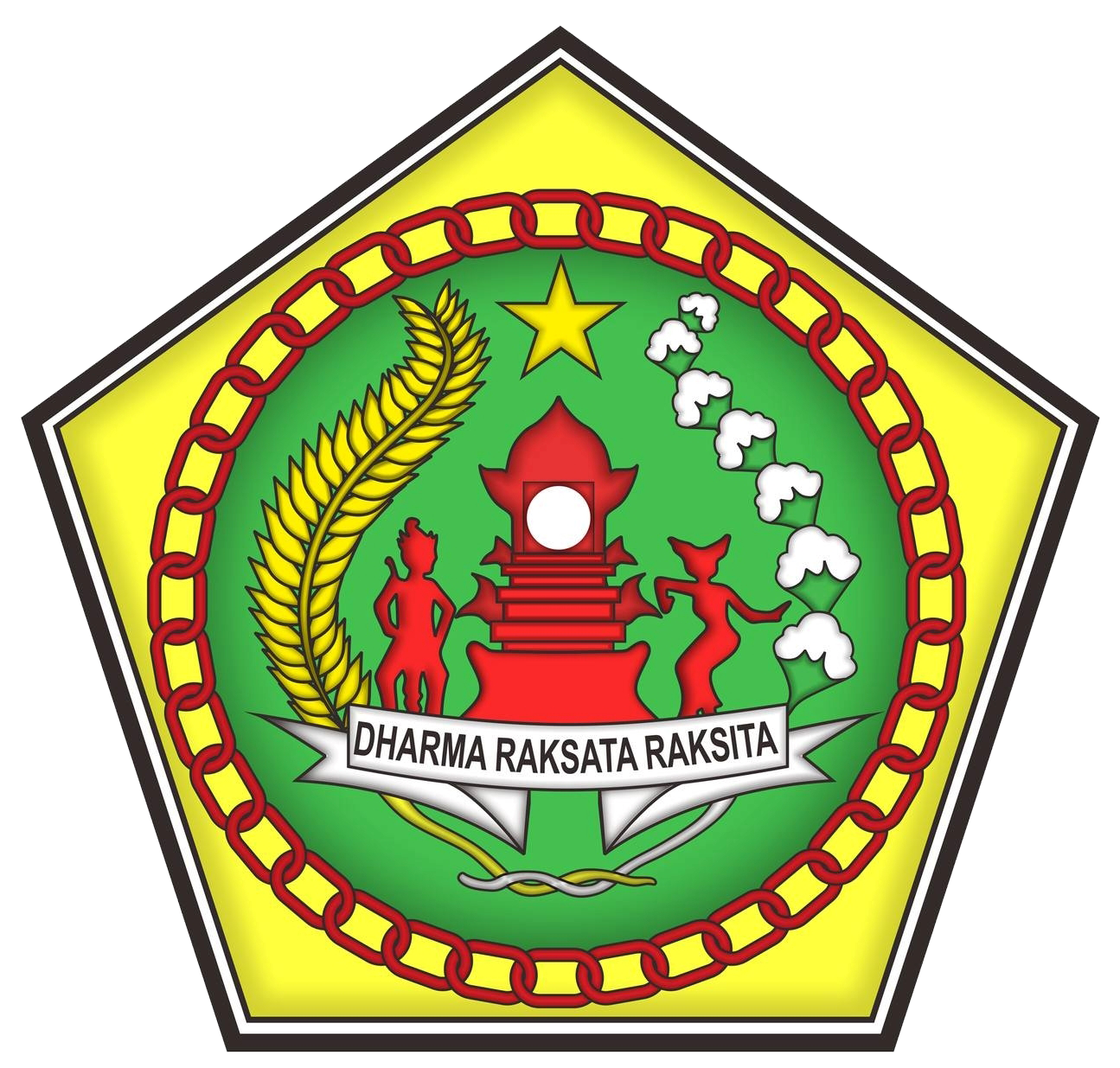
Gianyar Regency

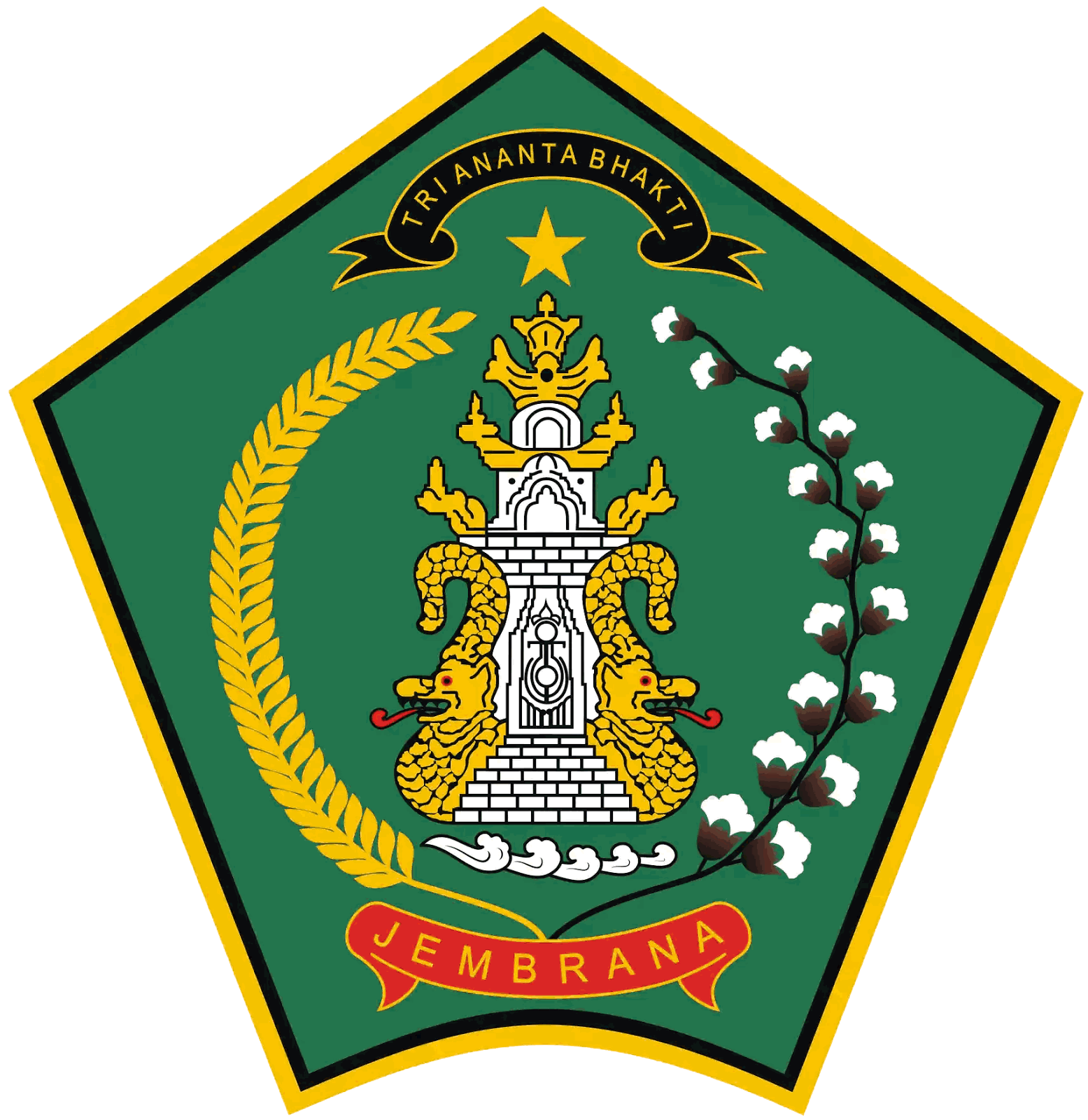
Jembrana Regency

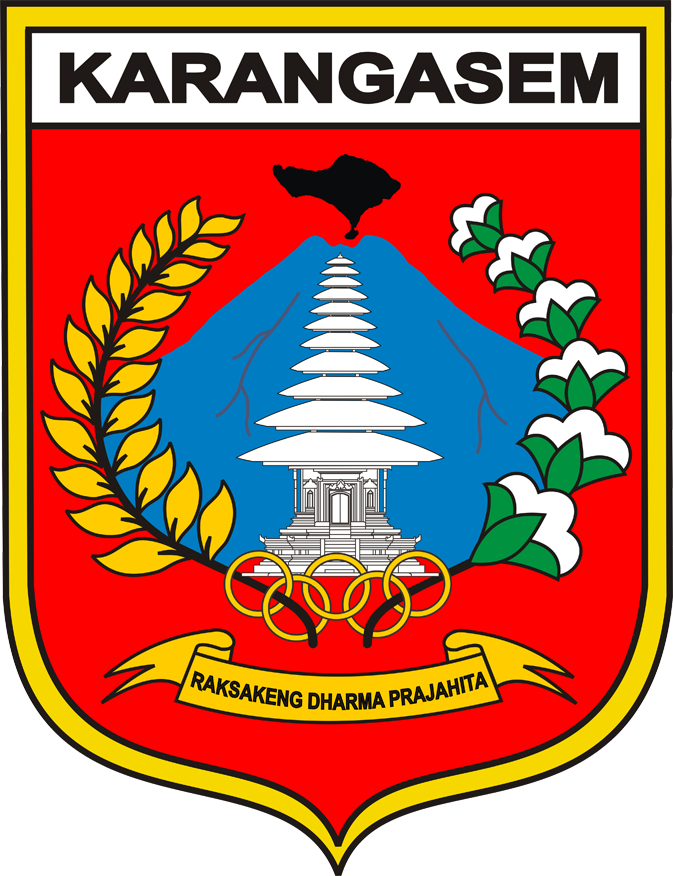
Karangasem Regency

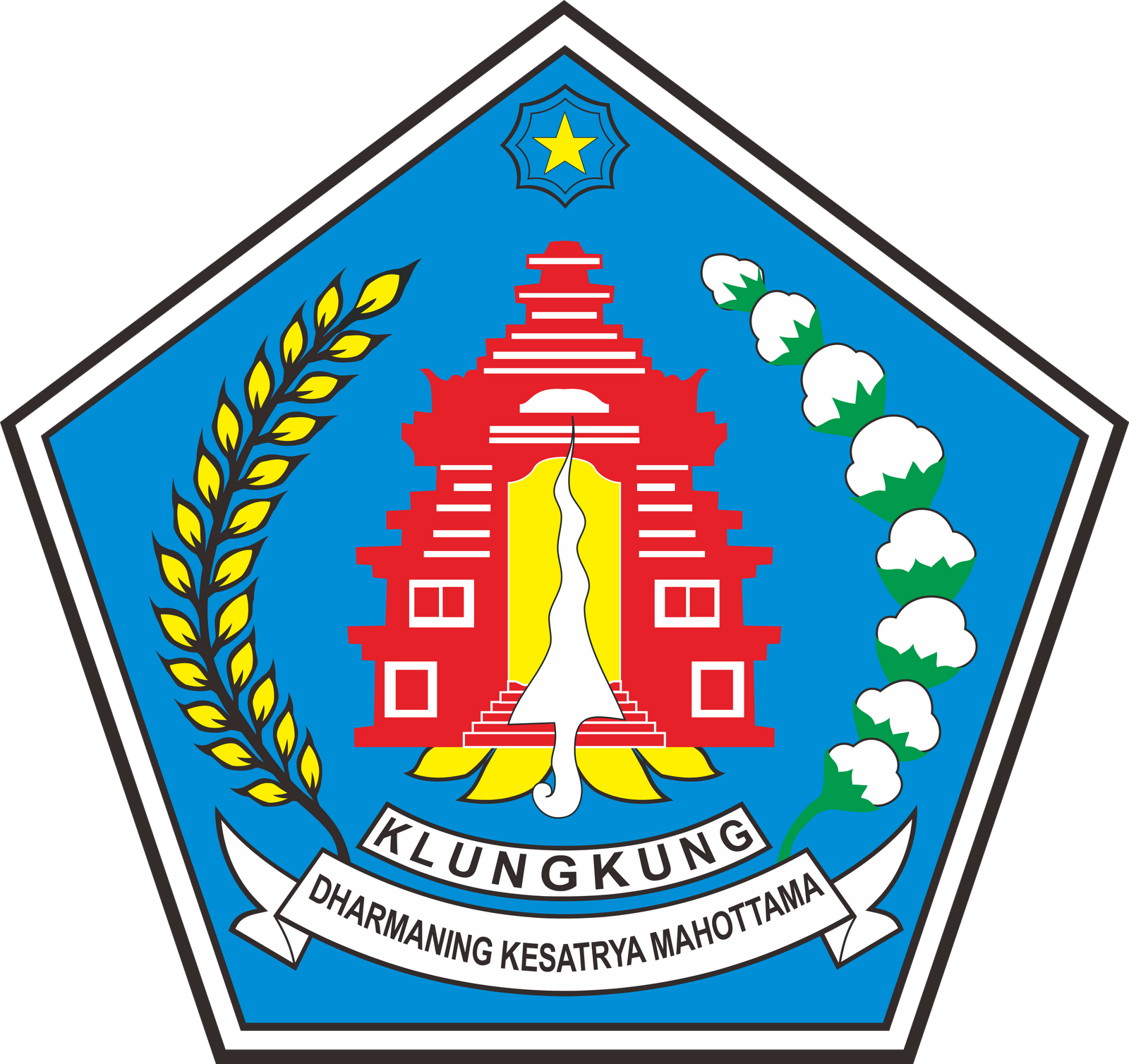
Klungkung Regency

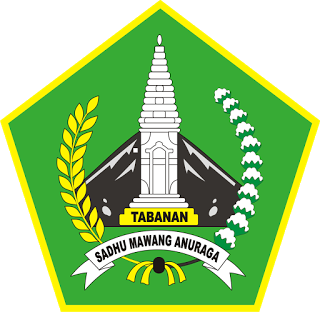
Tabanan Regency

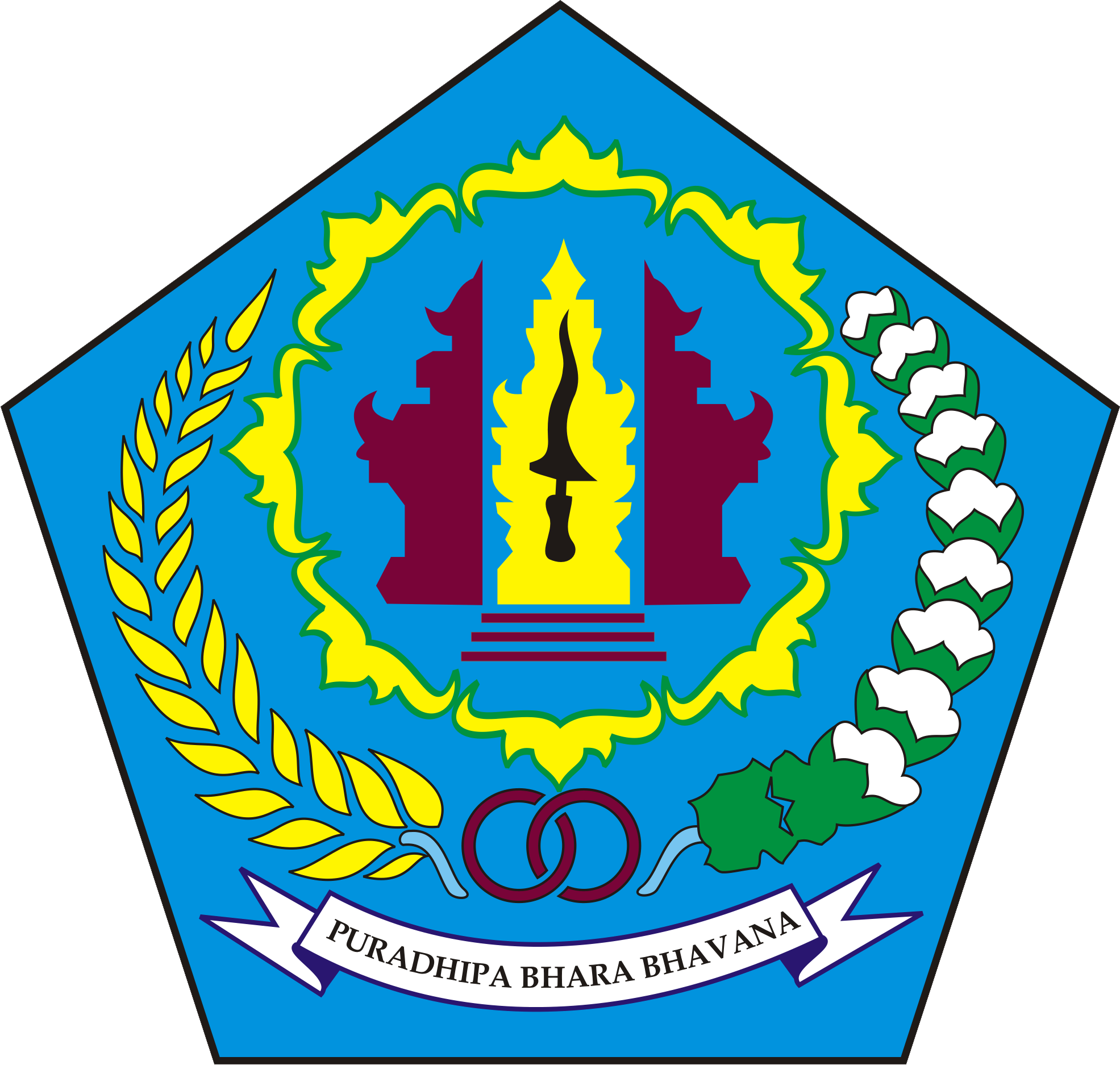
Denpasar City

=== West Nusa Tenggara ===
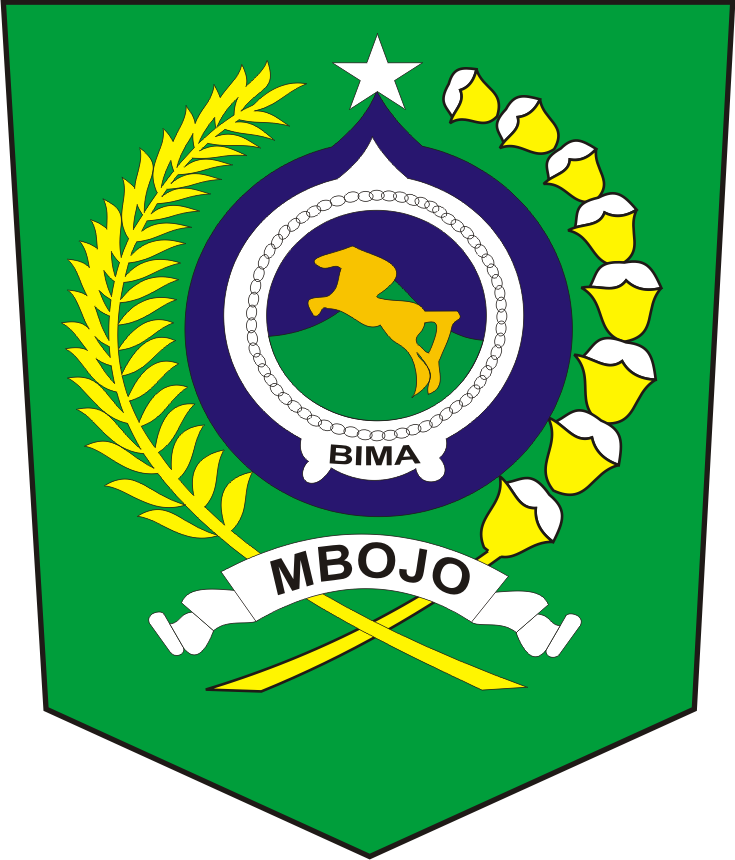
Bima Regency

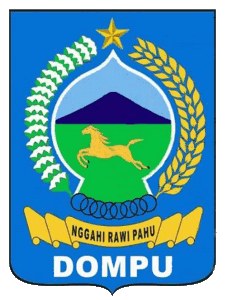
Dompu Regency

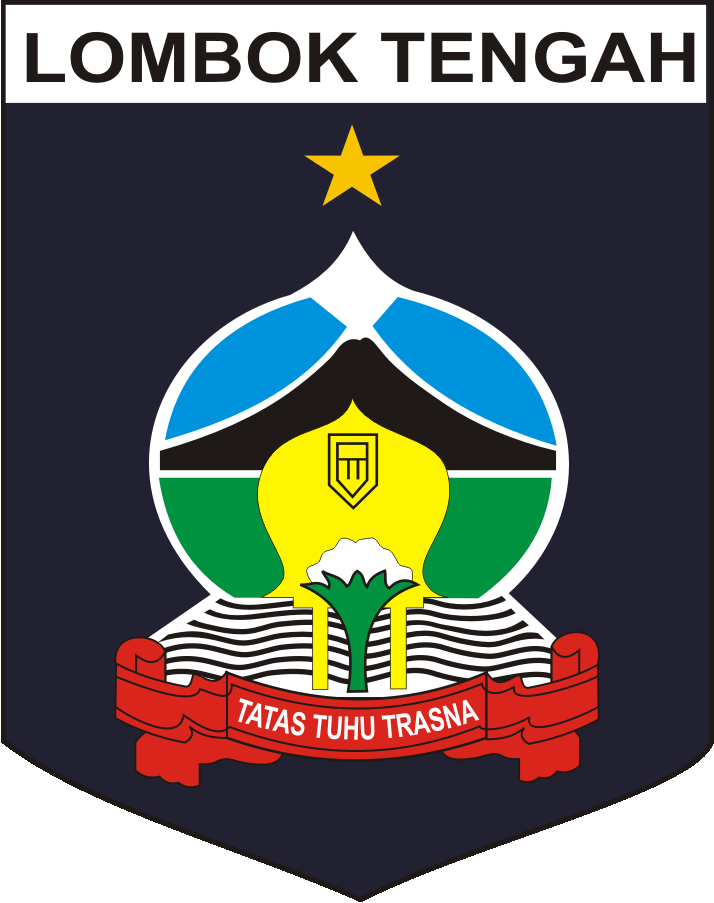
Central Lombok Regency

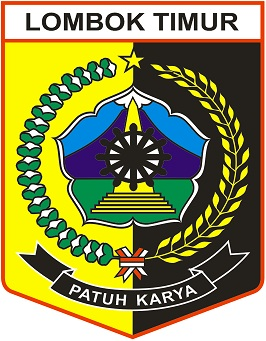
East Lombok Regency

North Lombok Regency

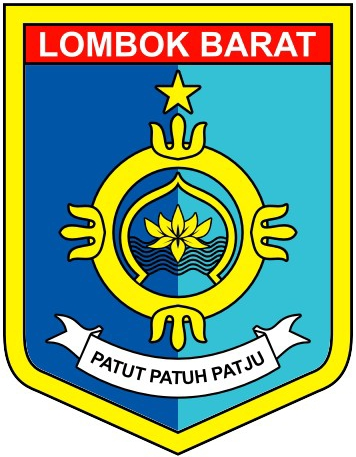
West Lombok Regency

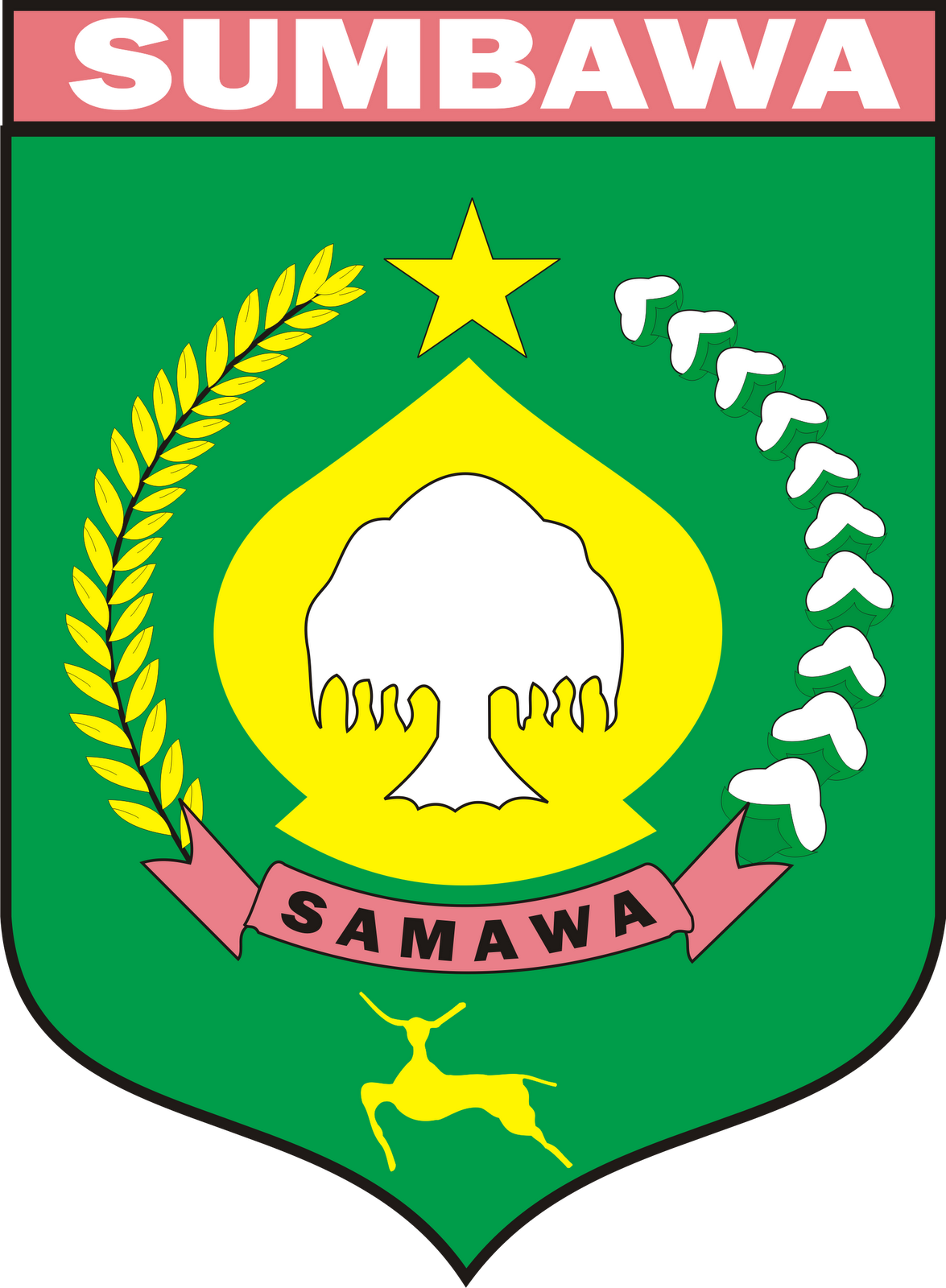
Sumbawa Regency

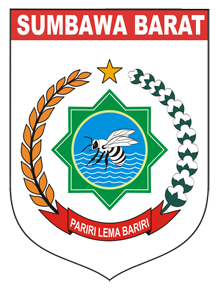
West Sumbawa Regency

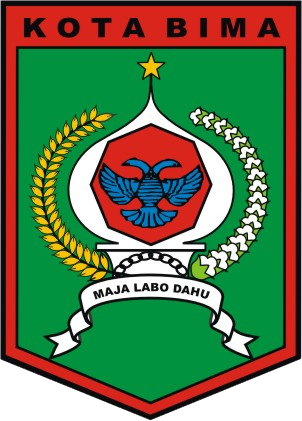
Bima City

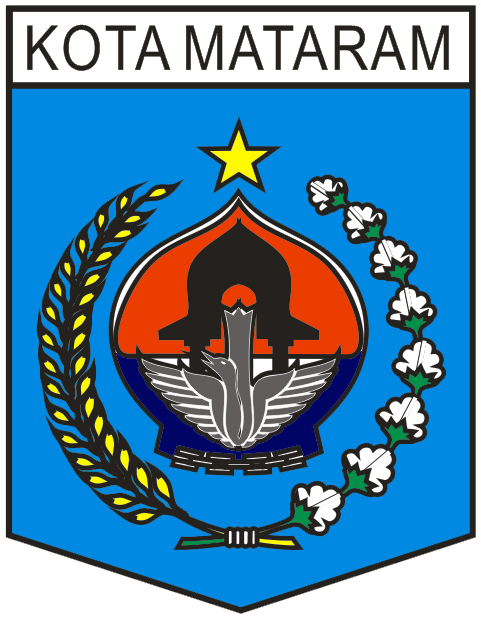
Mataram City

=== East Nusa Tenggara ===
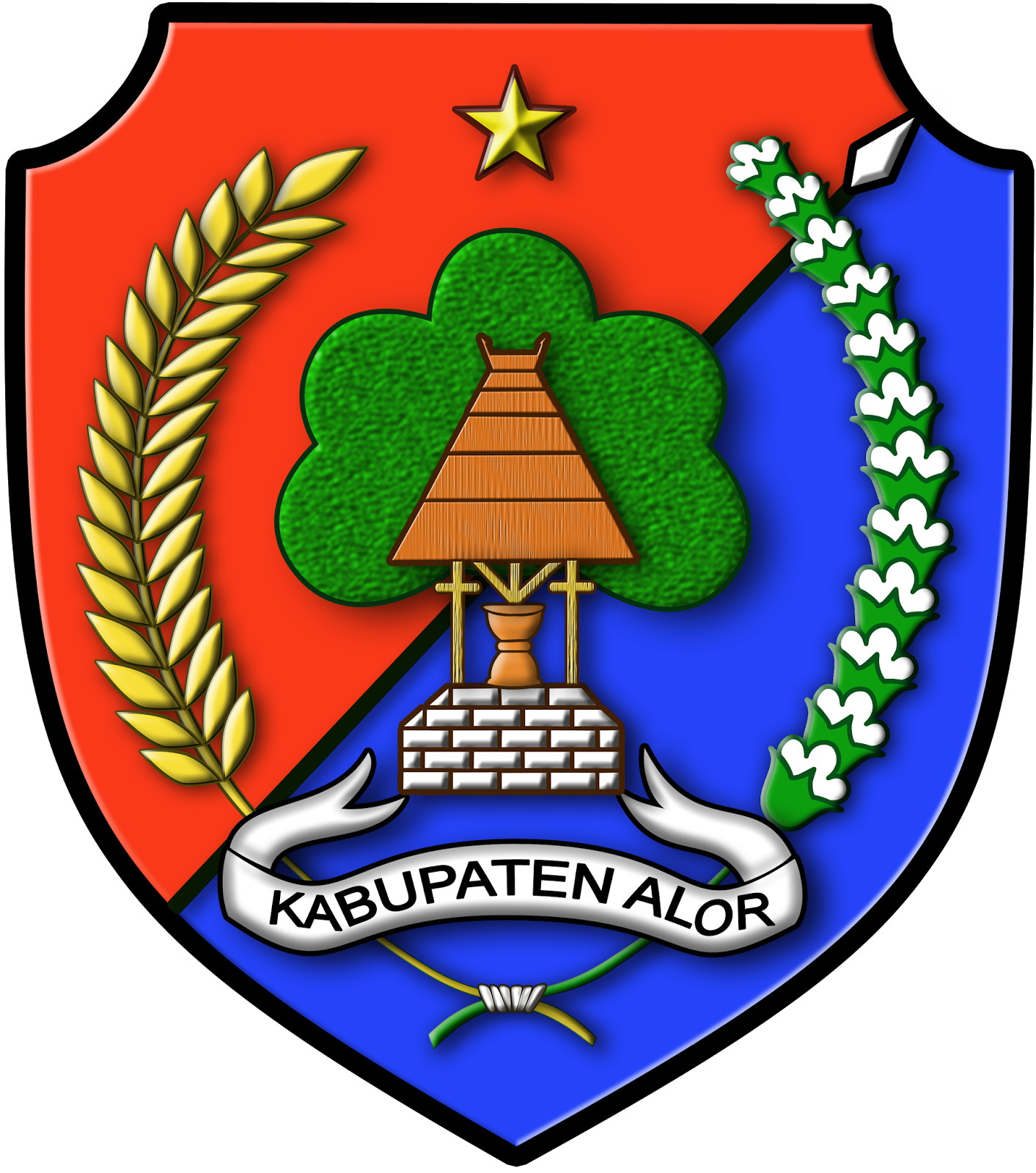
Alor Regency

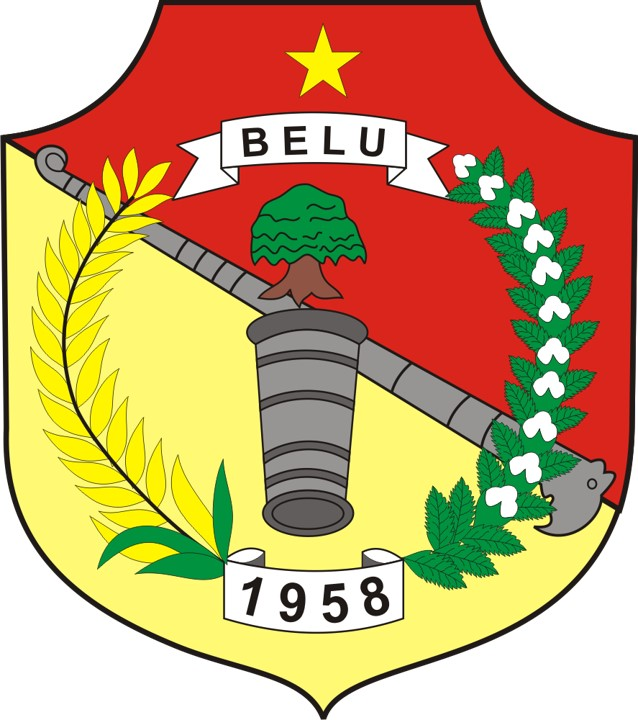
Belu Regency

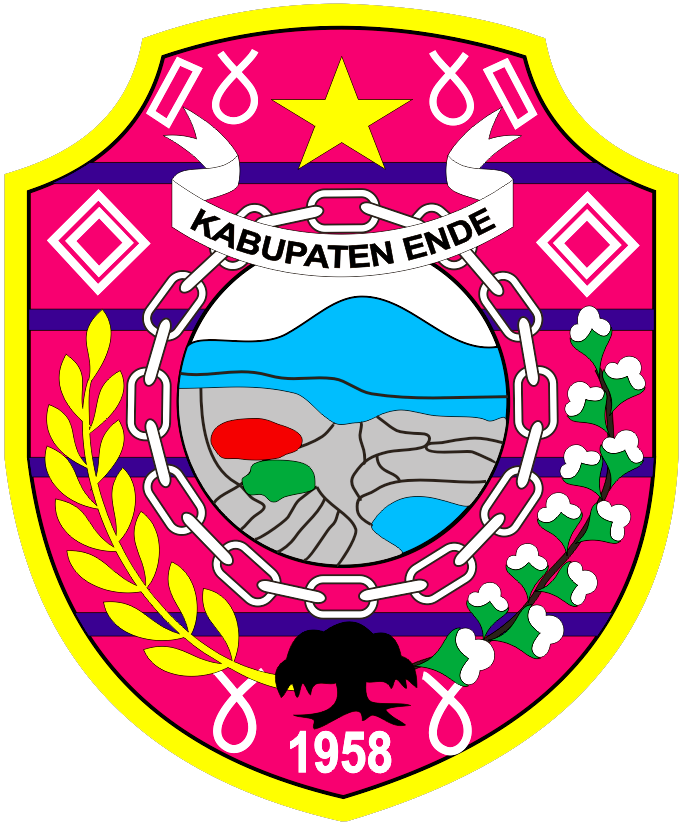
Ende Regency

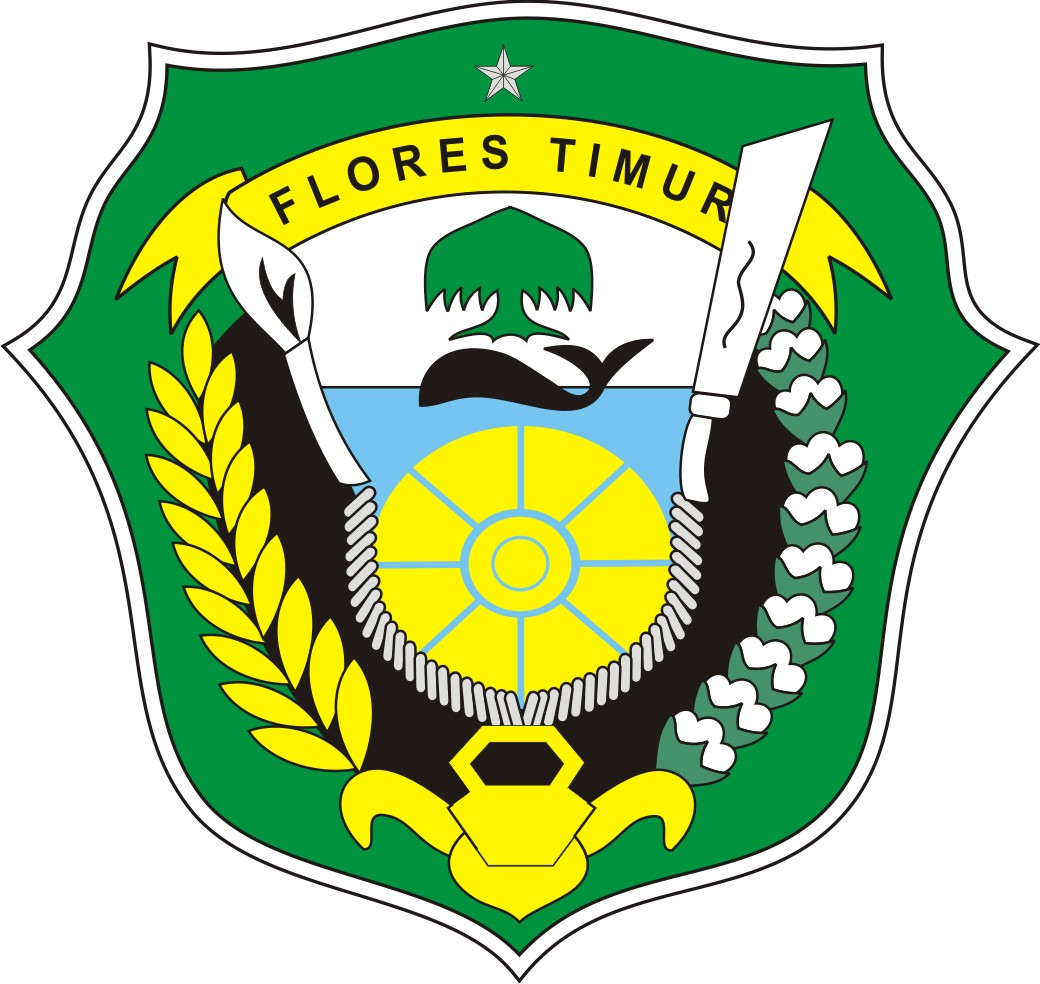
East Flores Regency

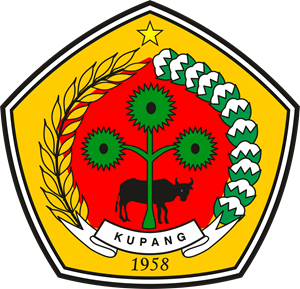
Kupang Regency

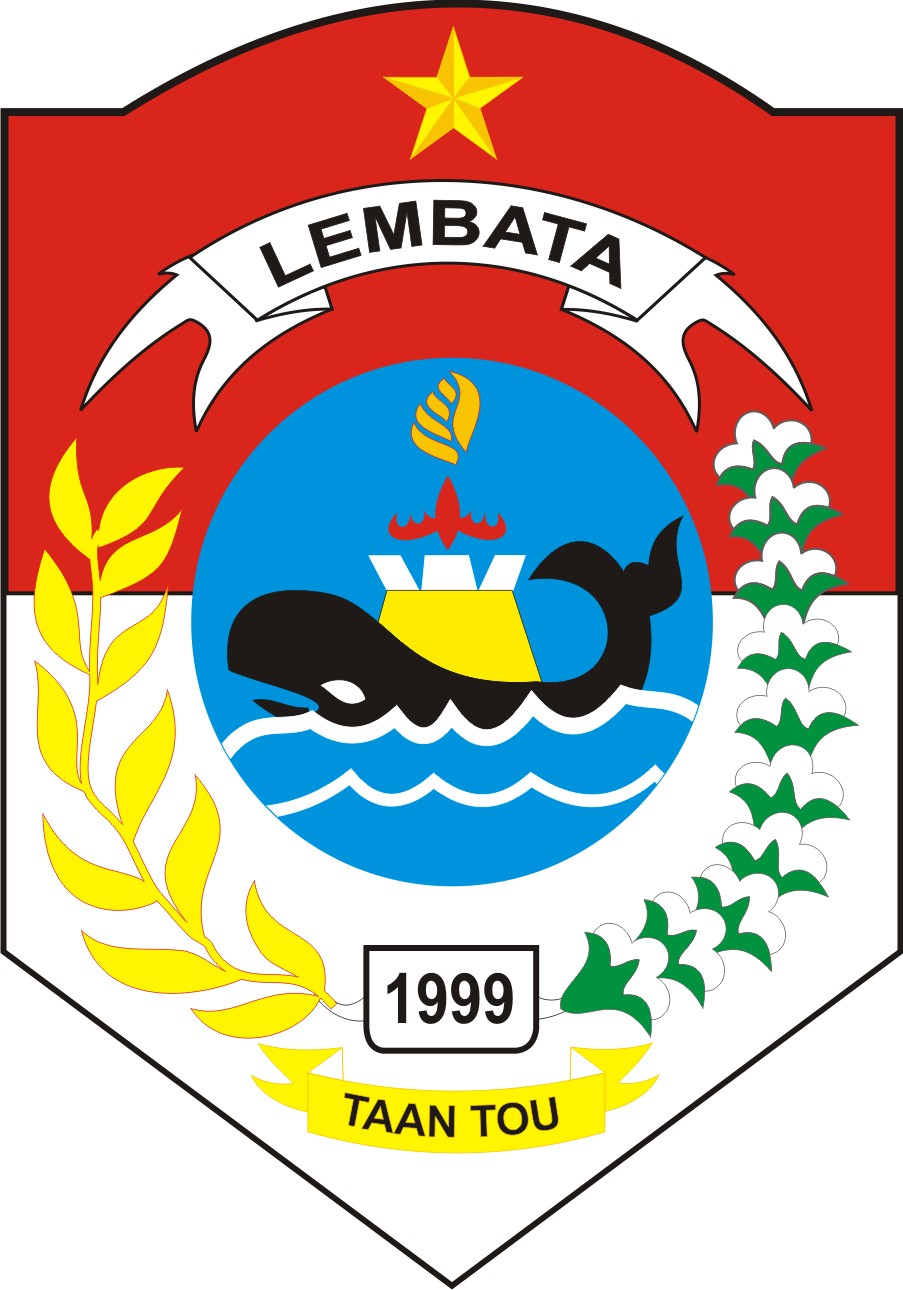
Lembata Regency

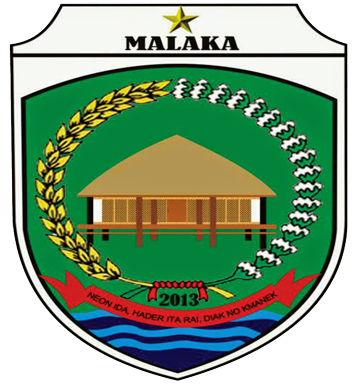
Malaka Regency

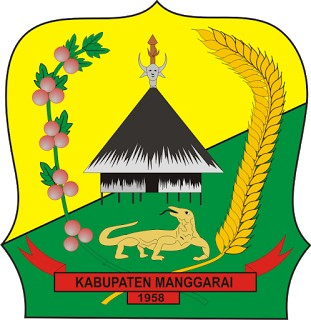
Manggarai Regency

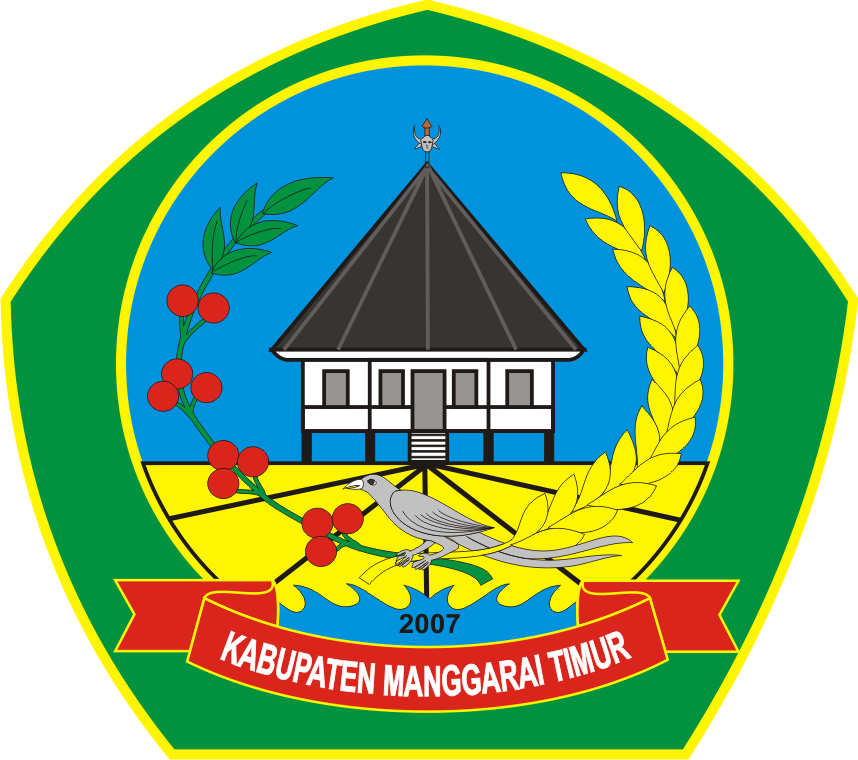
East Manggarai Regency

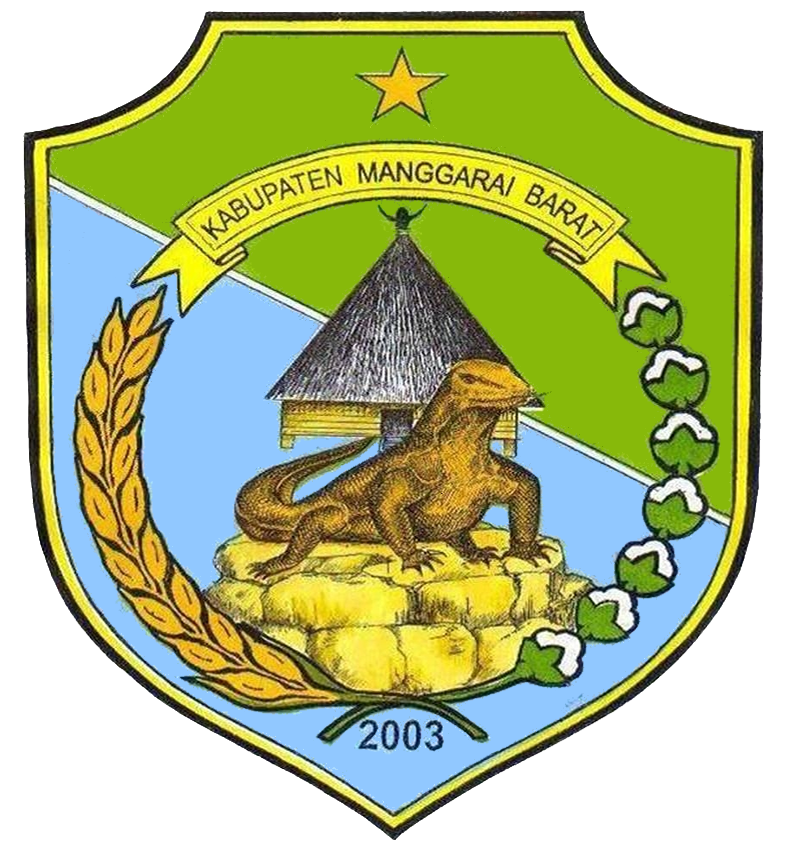
West Manggarai Regency

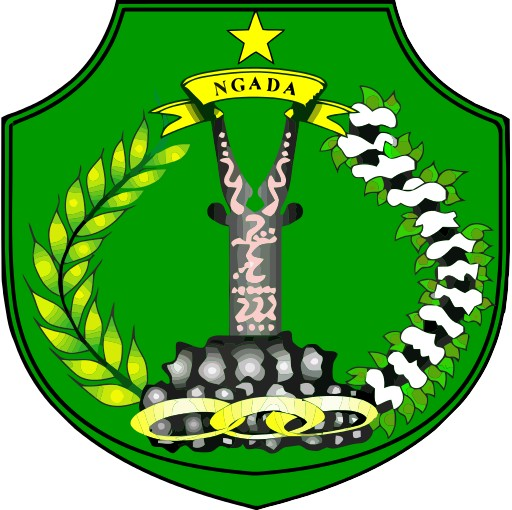
Ngada Regency

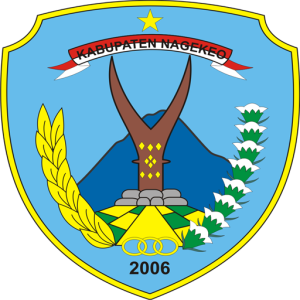
Nagekeo Regency

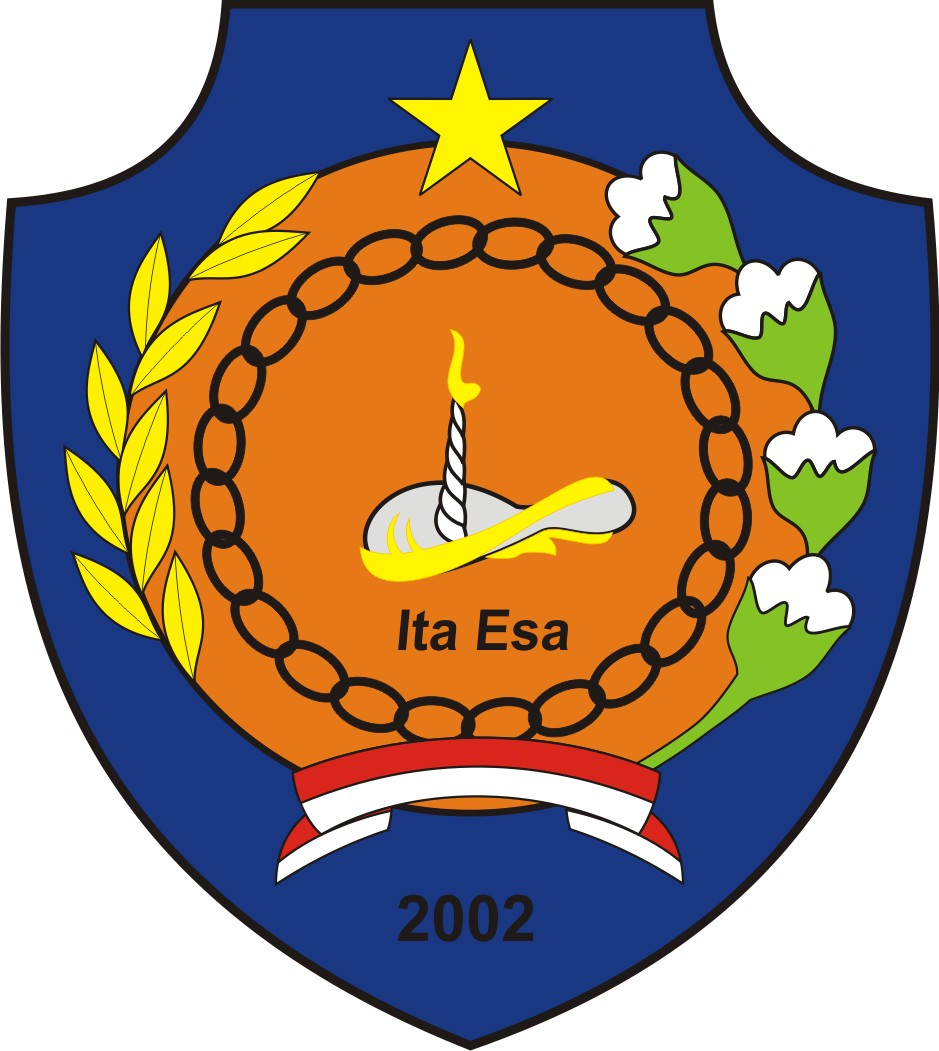
Rote Ndao Regency

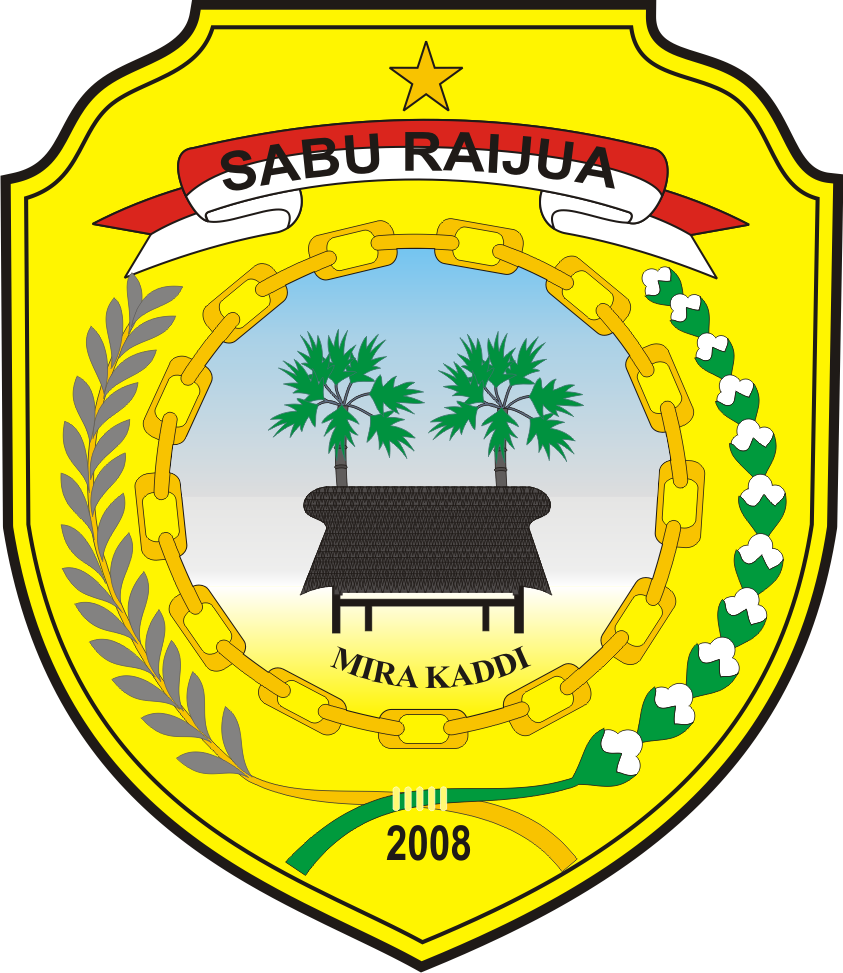
Sabu Raijua Regency

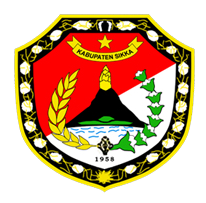
Sikka Regency

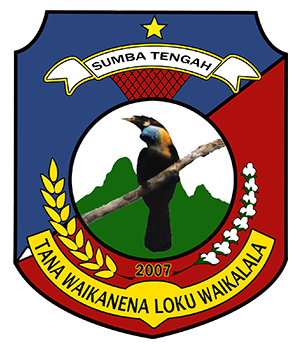
Central Sumba Regency

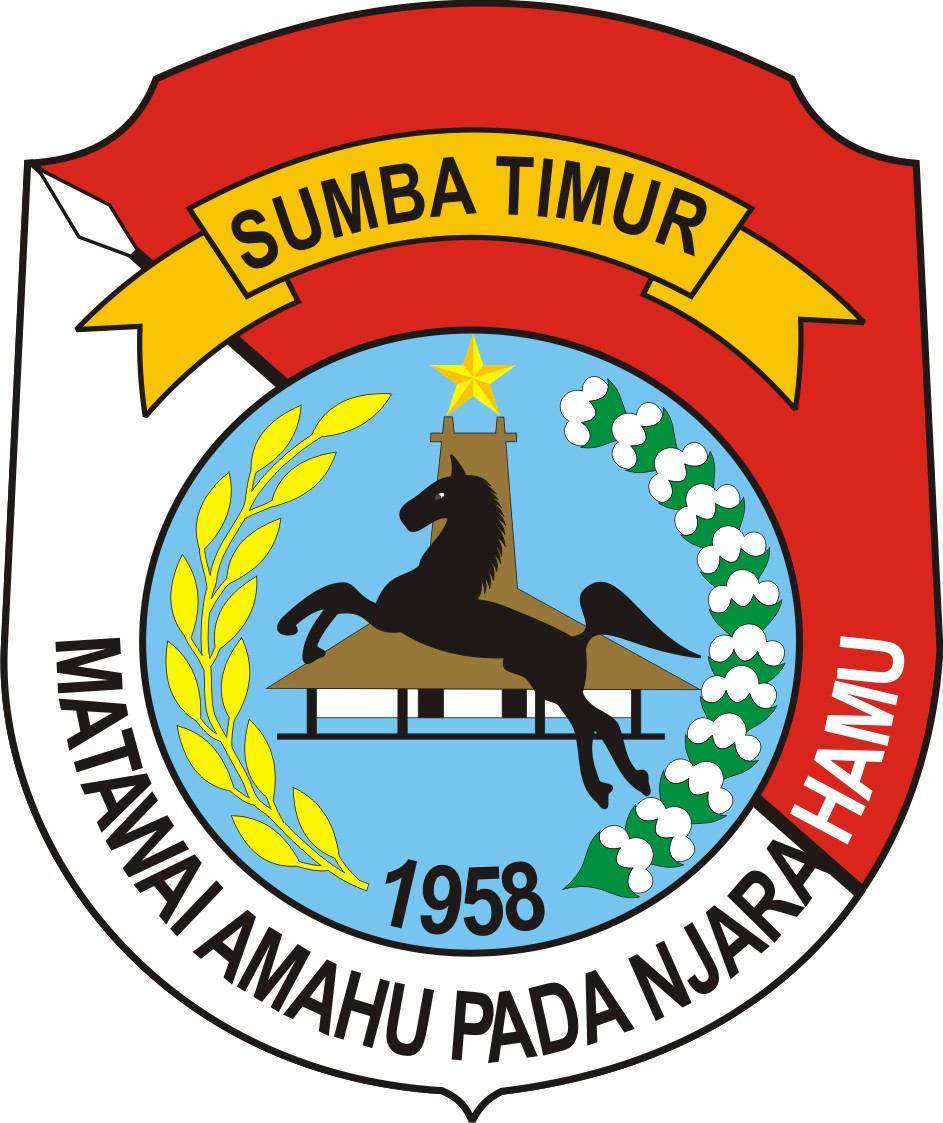
East Sumba Regency

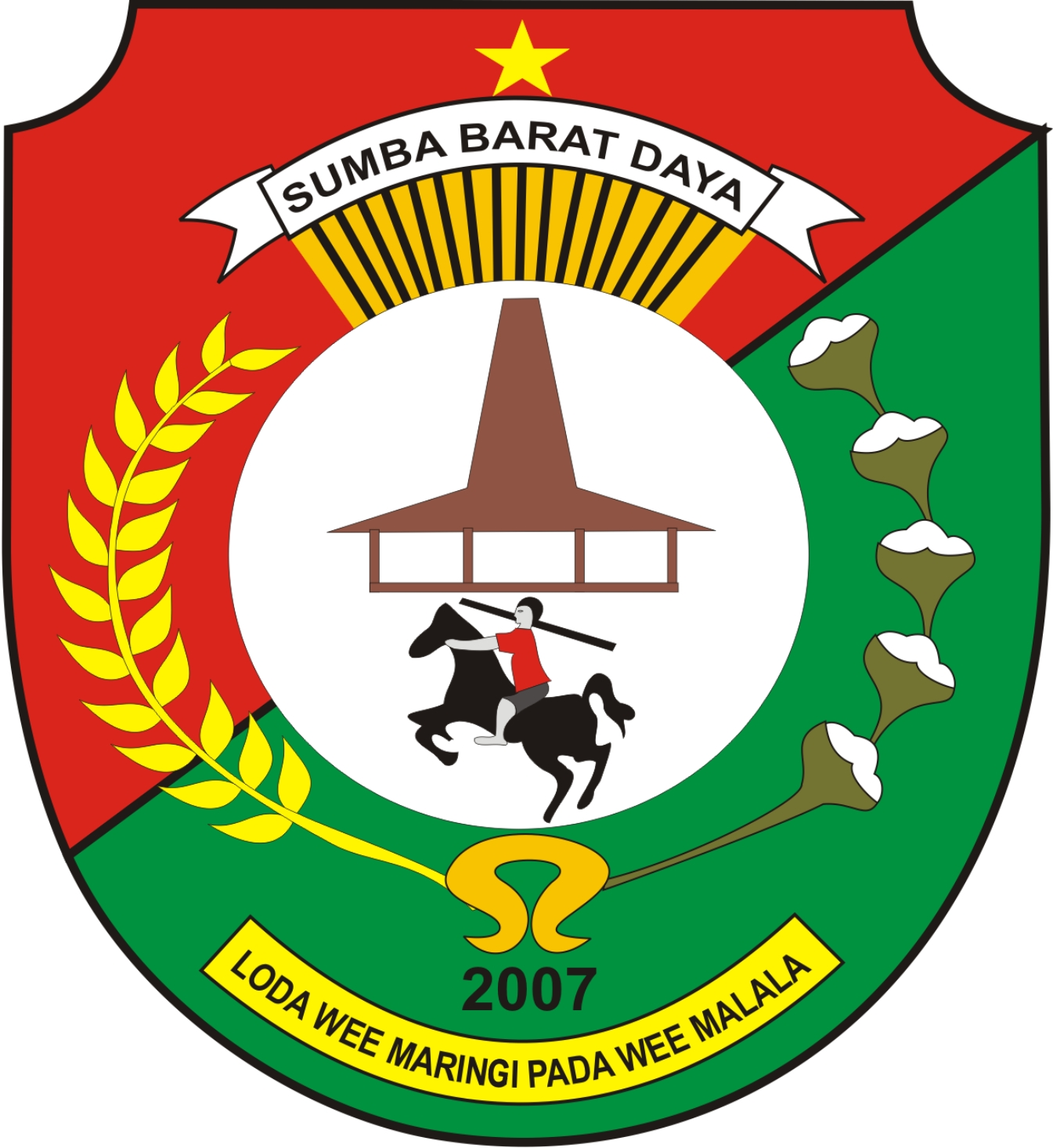
Southwest Sumba Regency

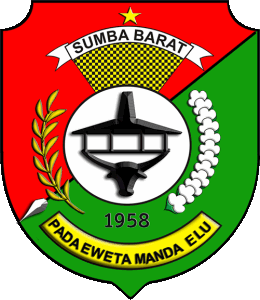
West Sumba Regency

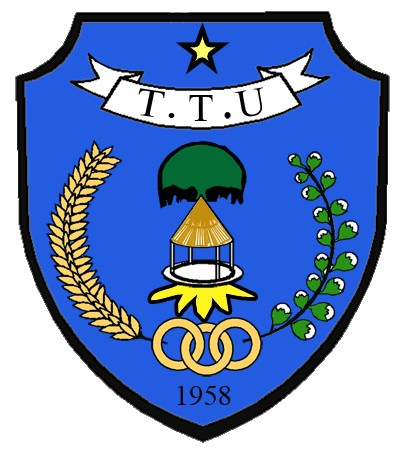
North Central Timor Regency

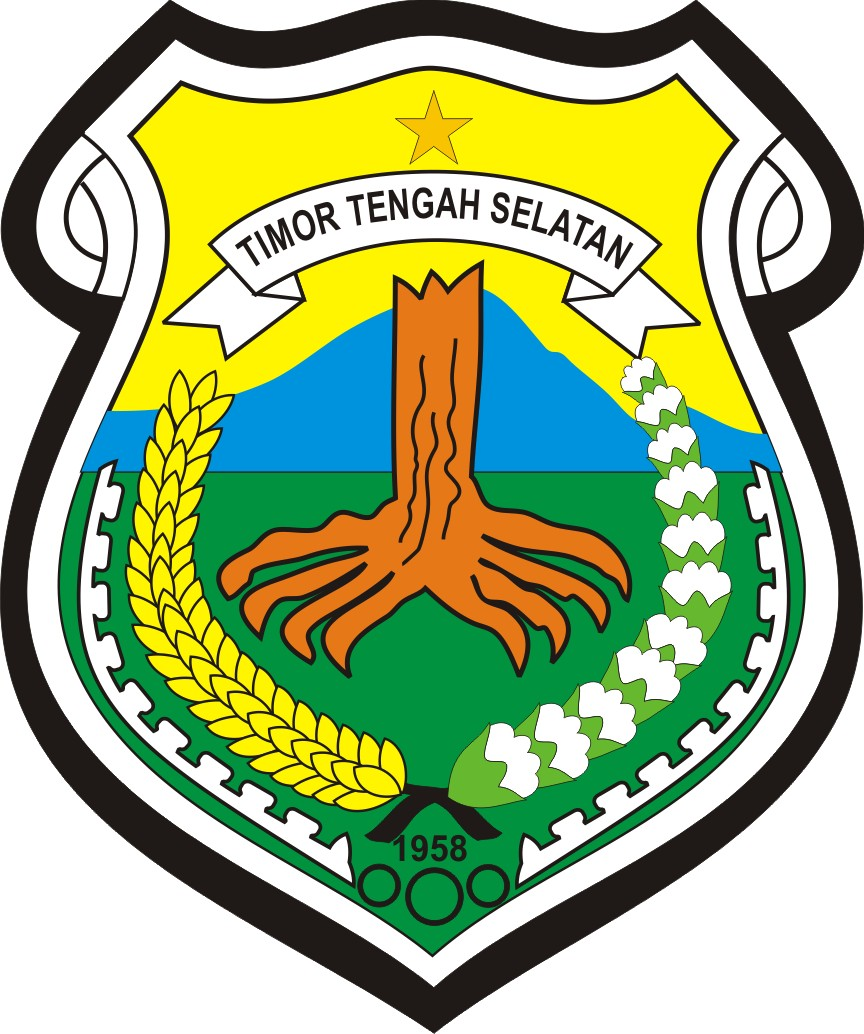
South Central Timor Regency

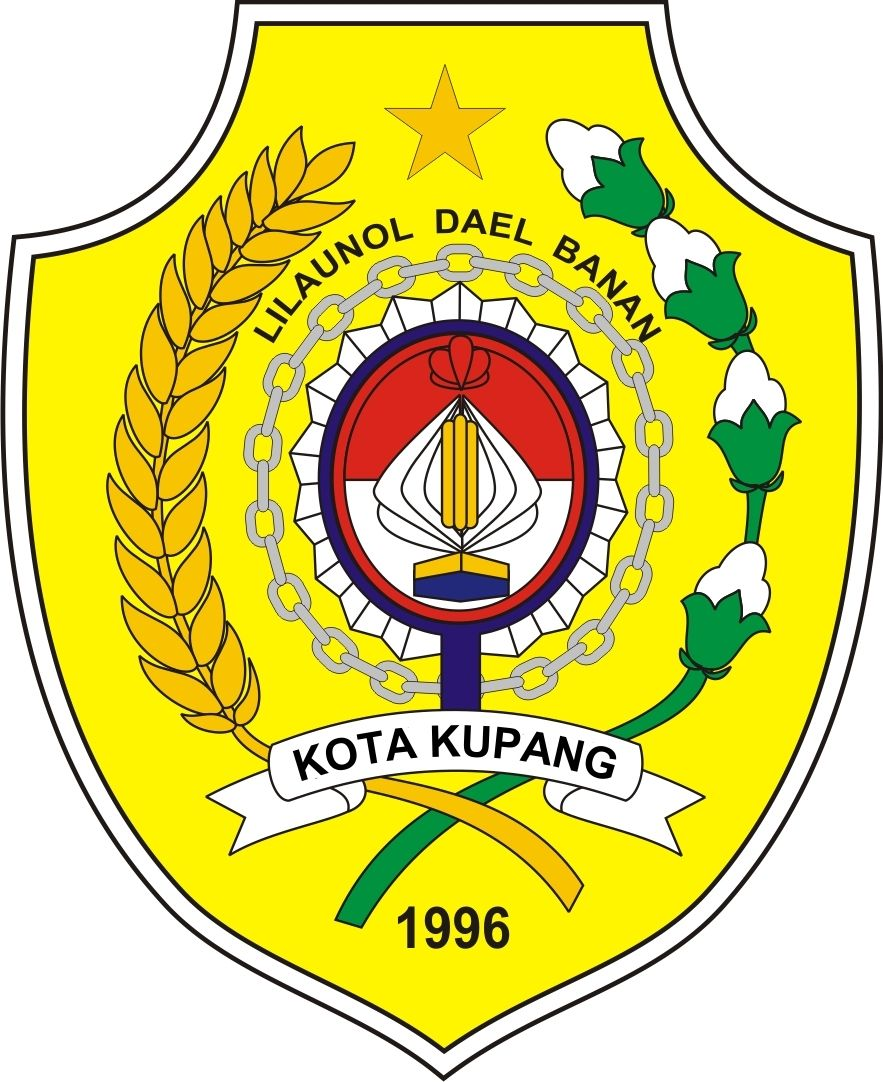
Kupang City

=== West Kalimantan ===
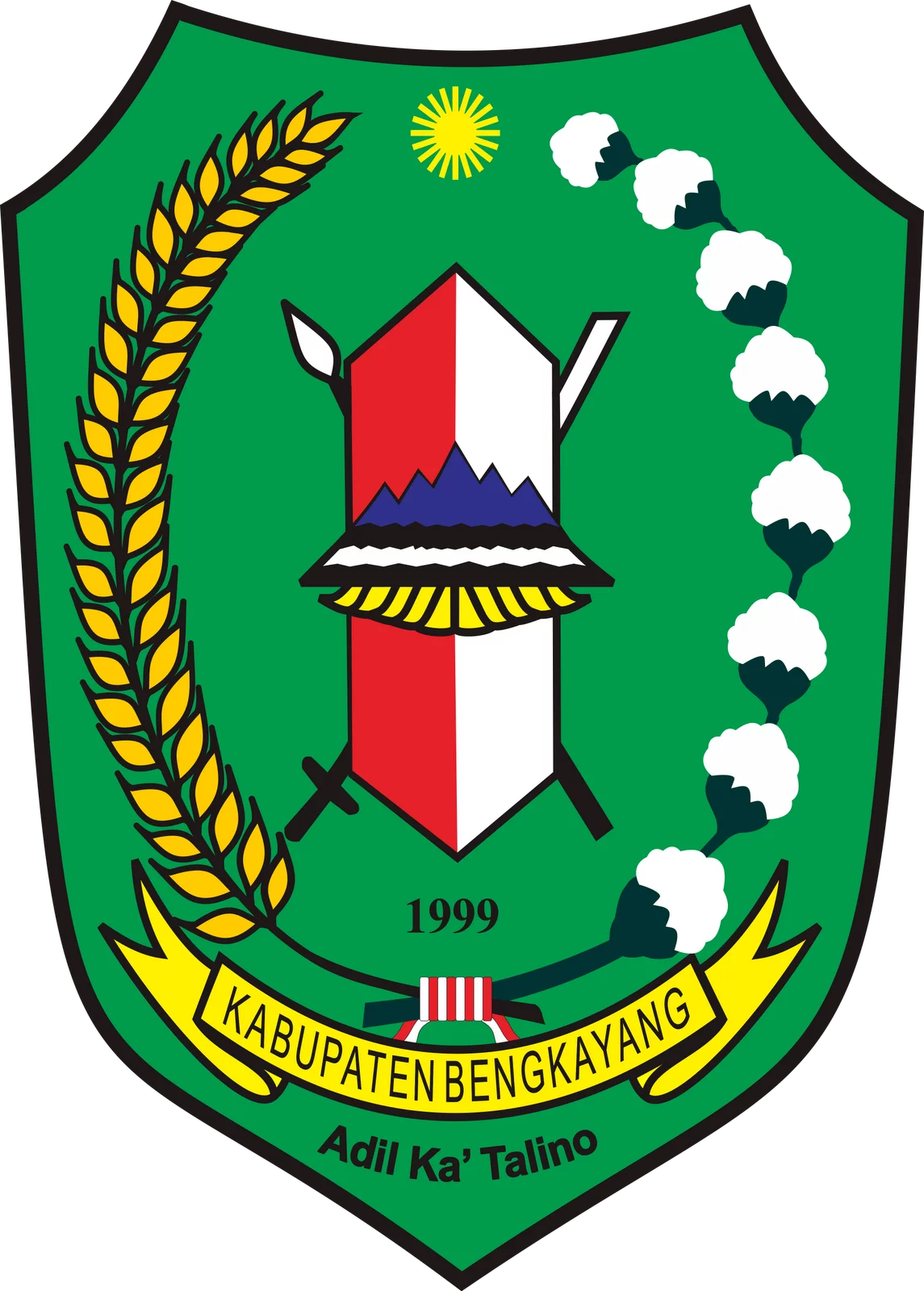
Bengkayang Regency

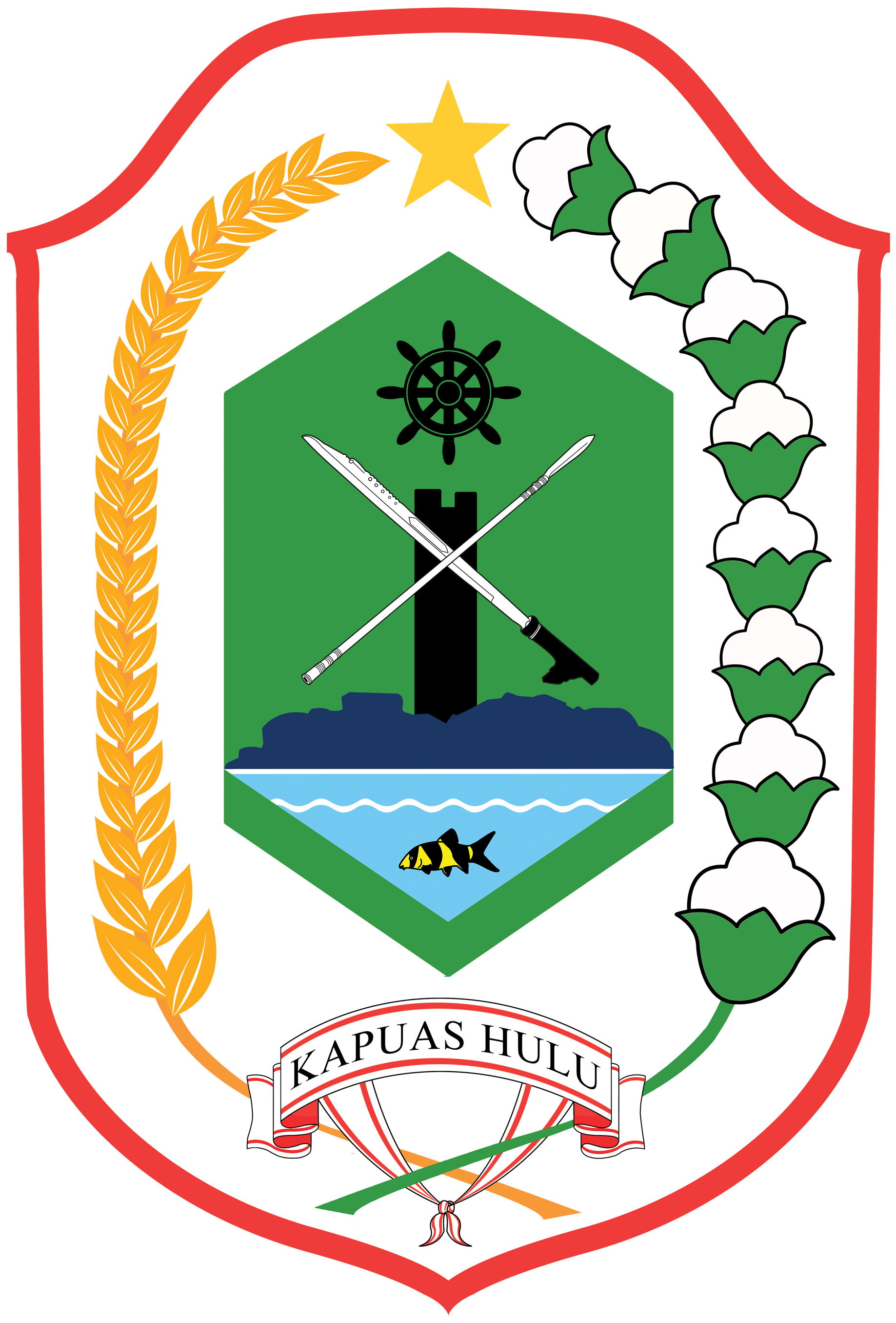
Kapuas Hulu Regency

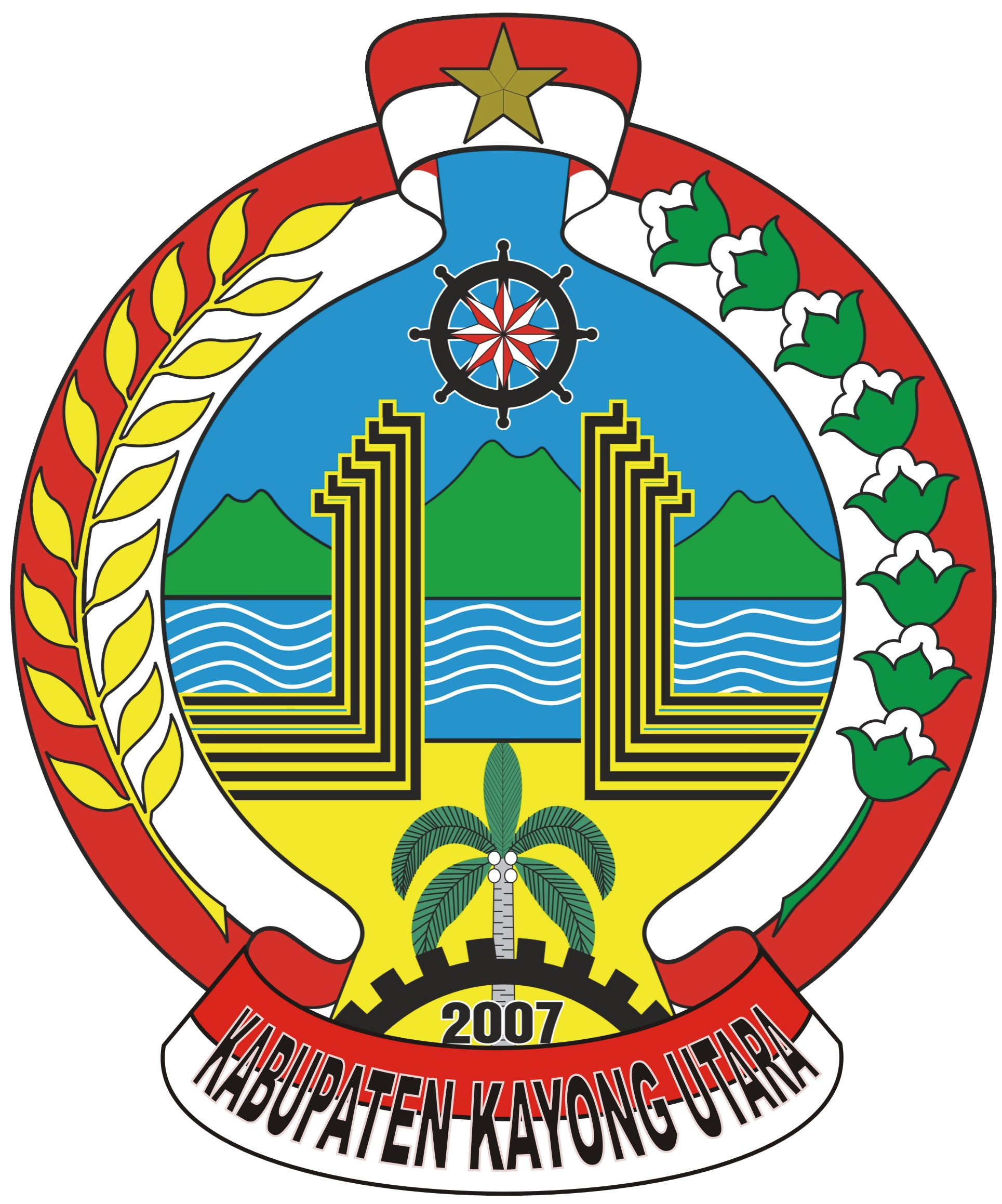
North Kayong Regency

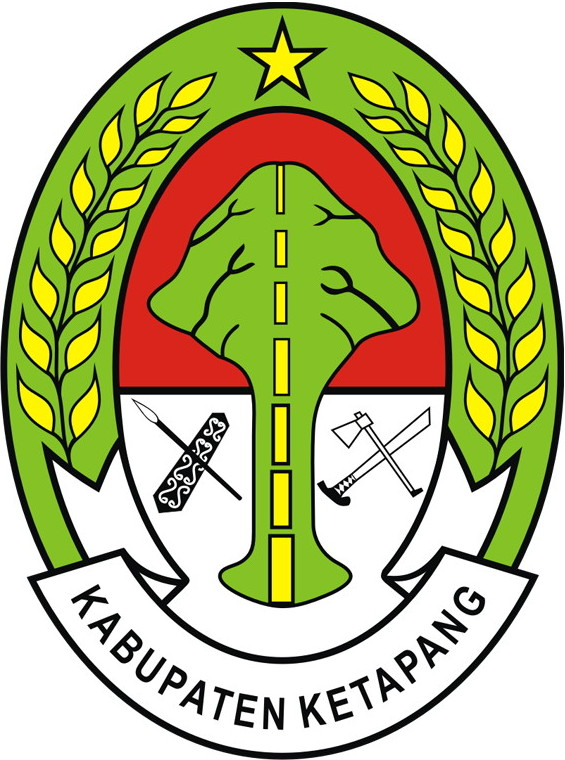
Ketapang Regency

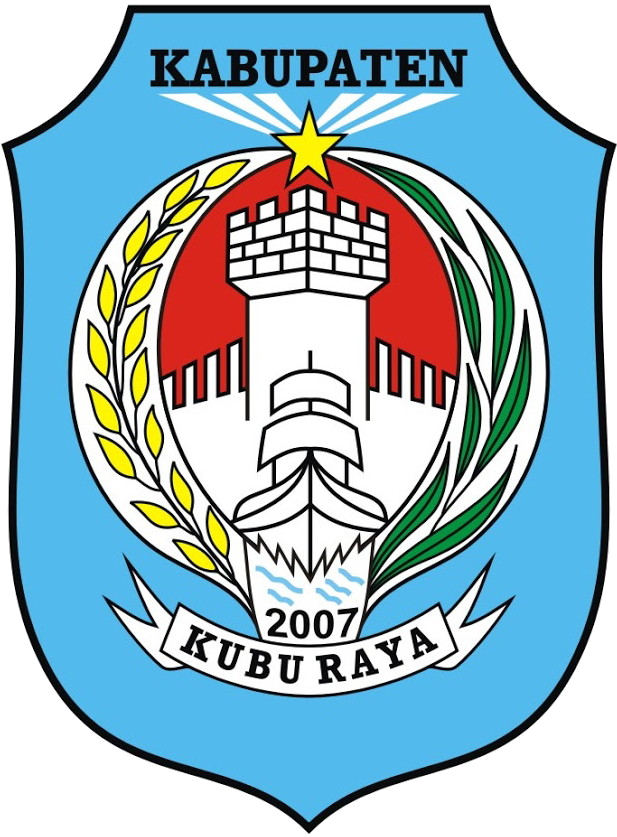
Kubu Raya Regency

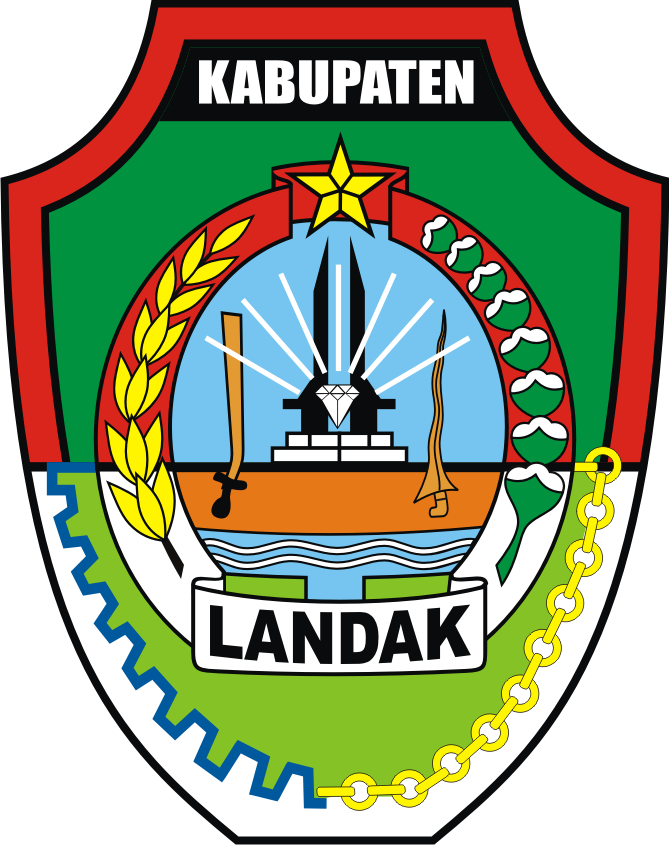
Landak Regency

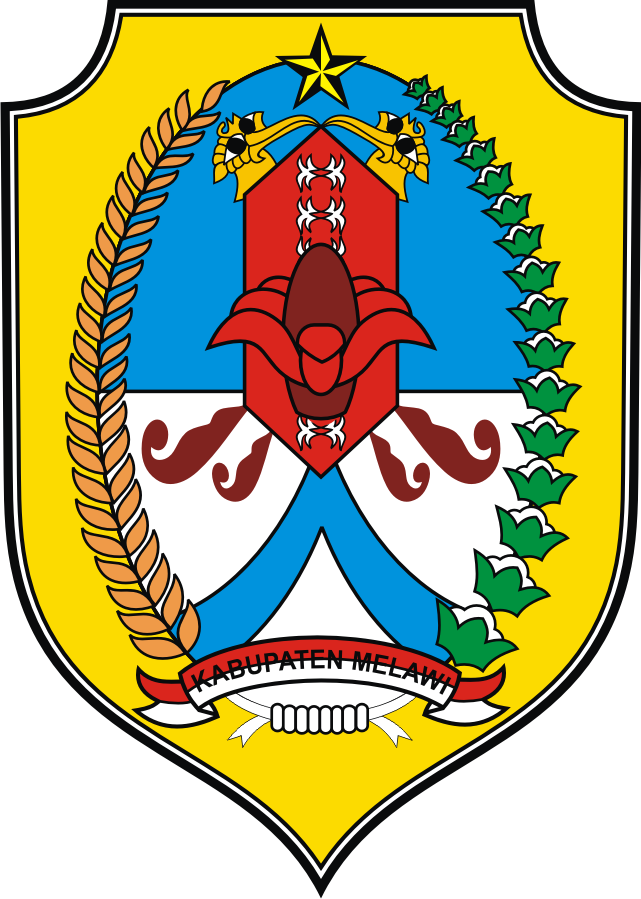
Melawi Regency

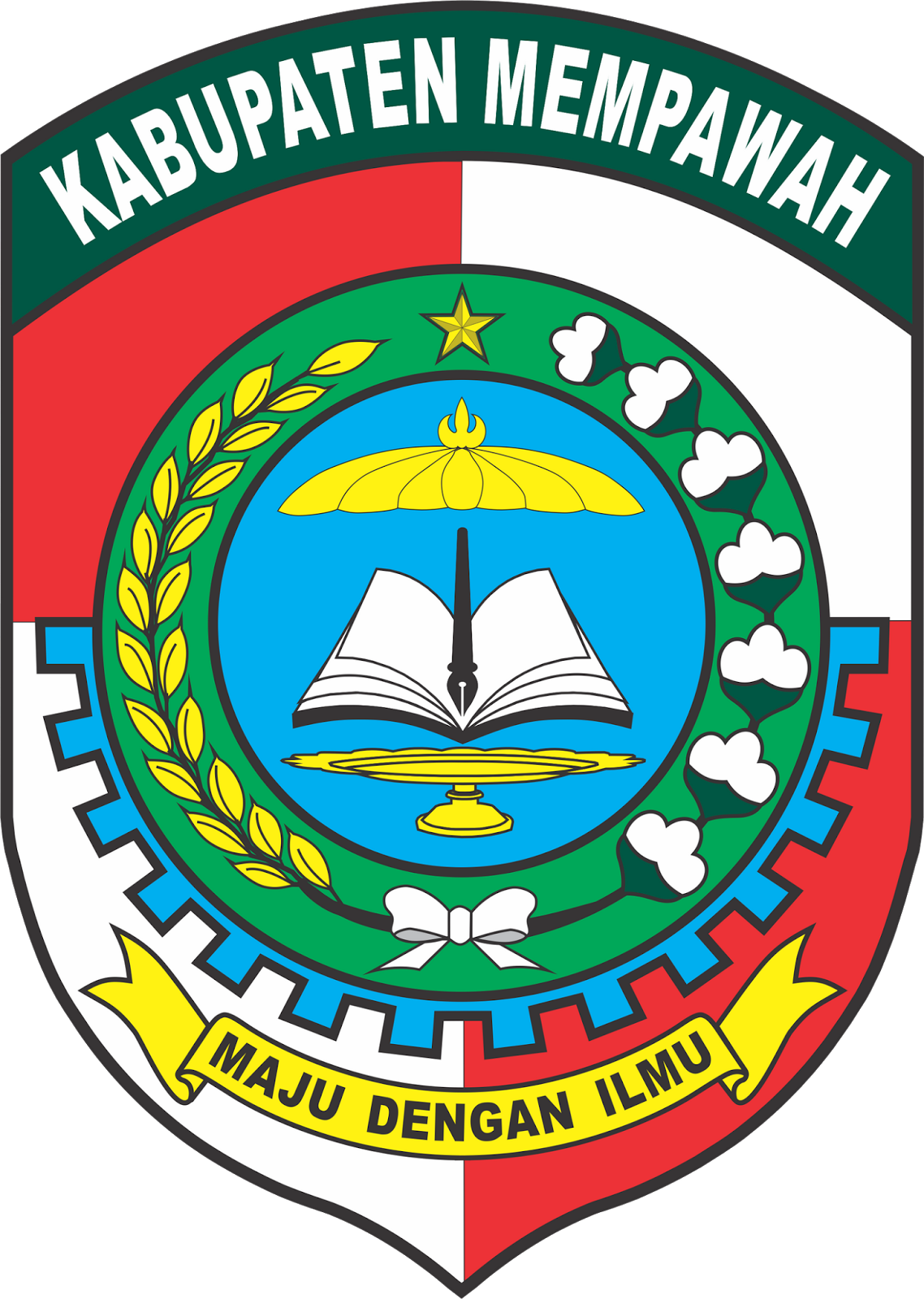
Mempawah Regency

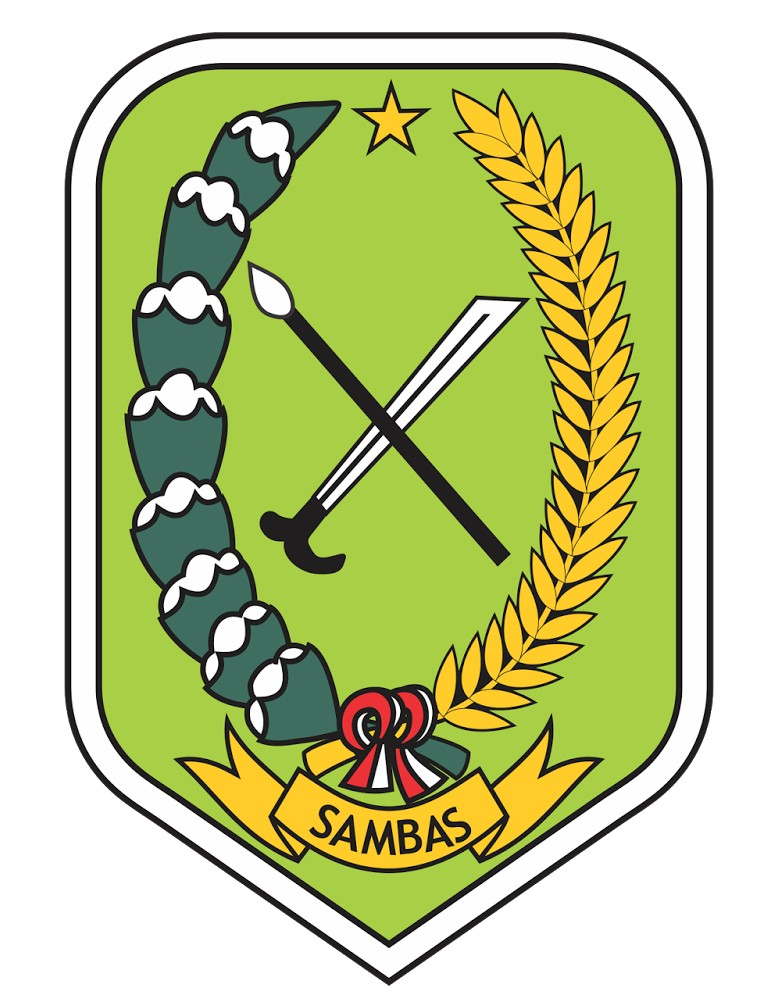
Sambas Regency

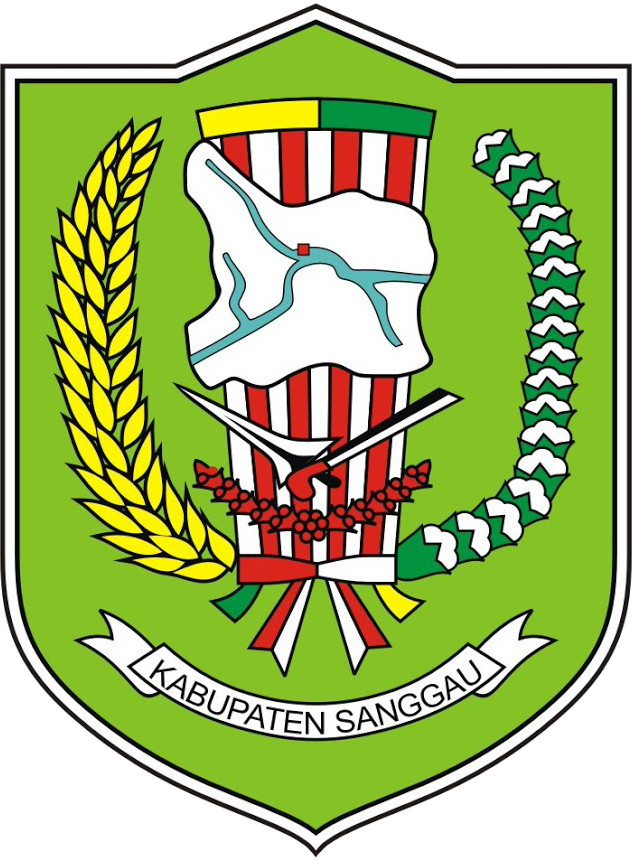
Sanggau Regency

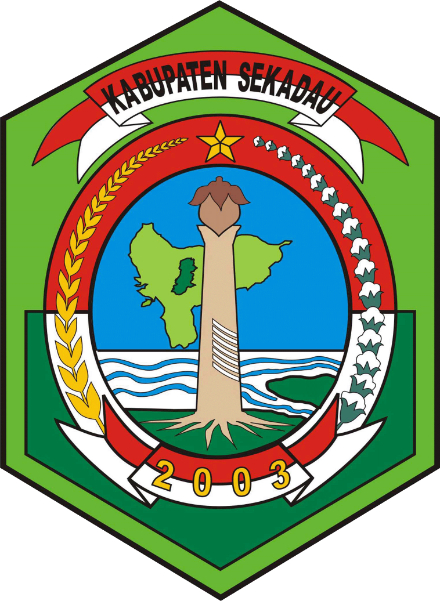
Sekadau Regency

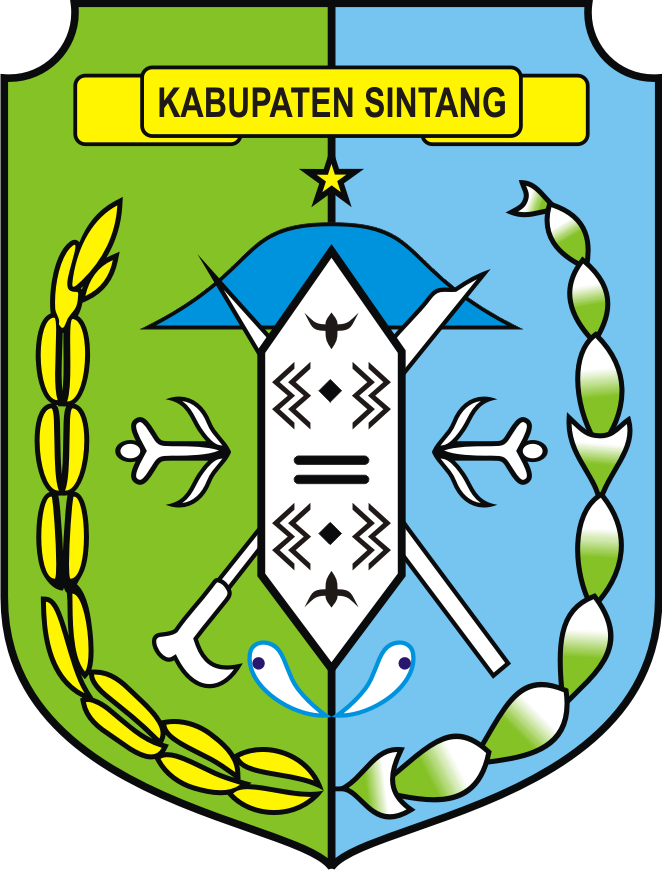
Sintang Regency

Pontianak City

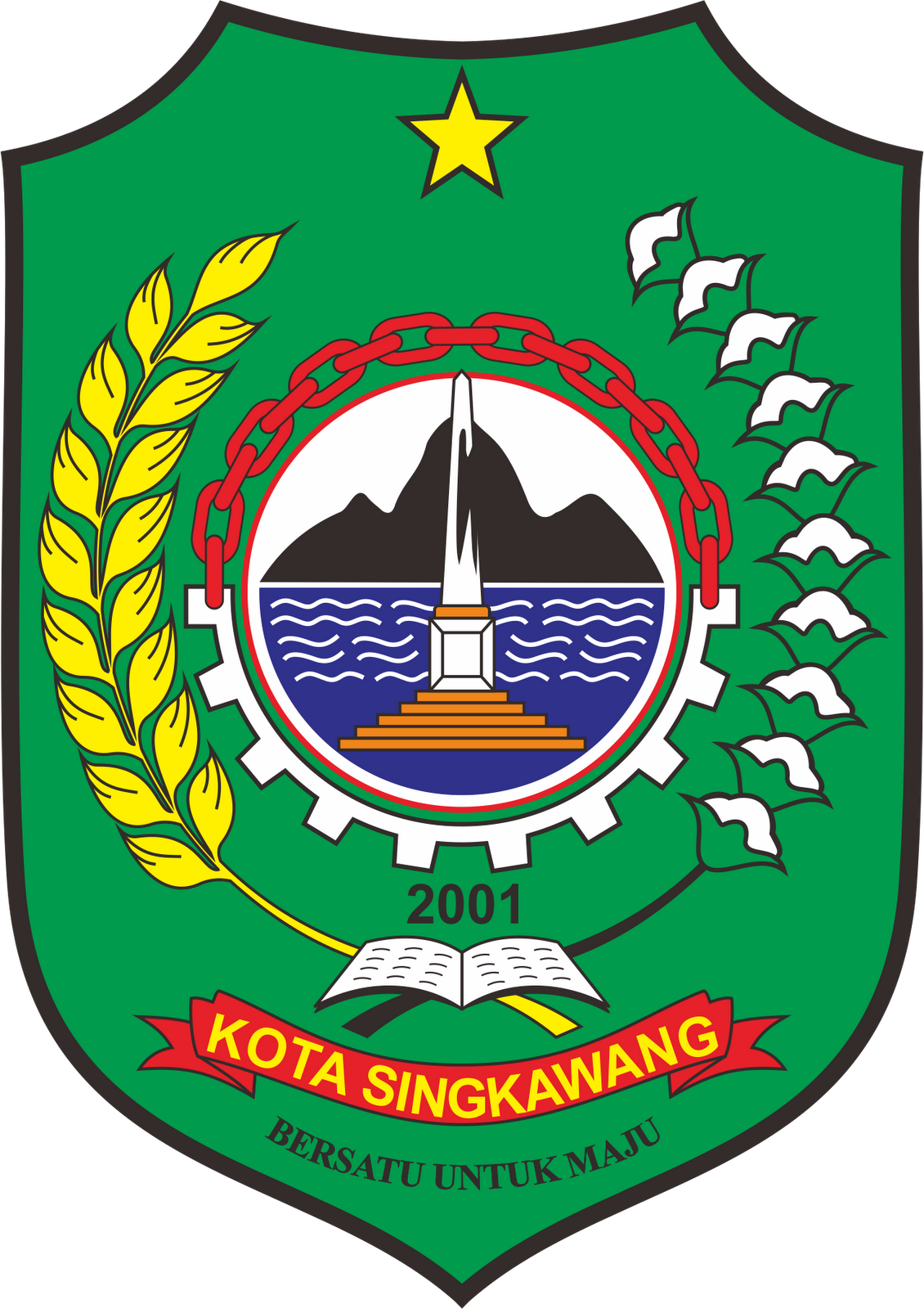
Singkawang City

=== Central Kalimantan ===
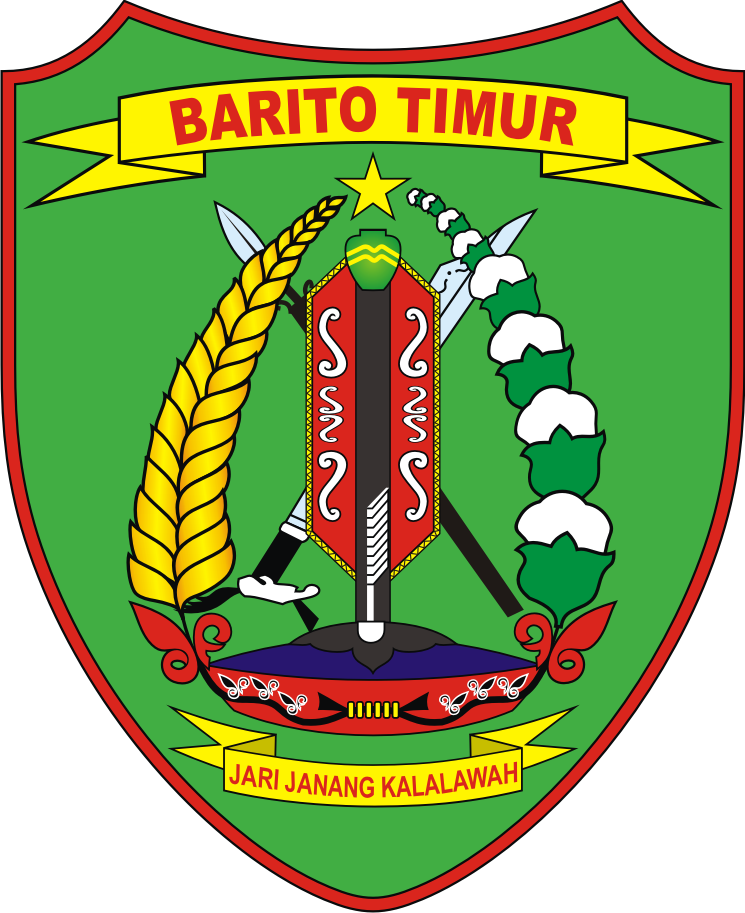
East Barito Regency

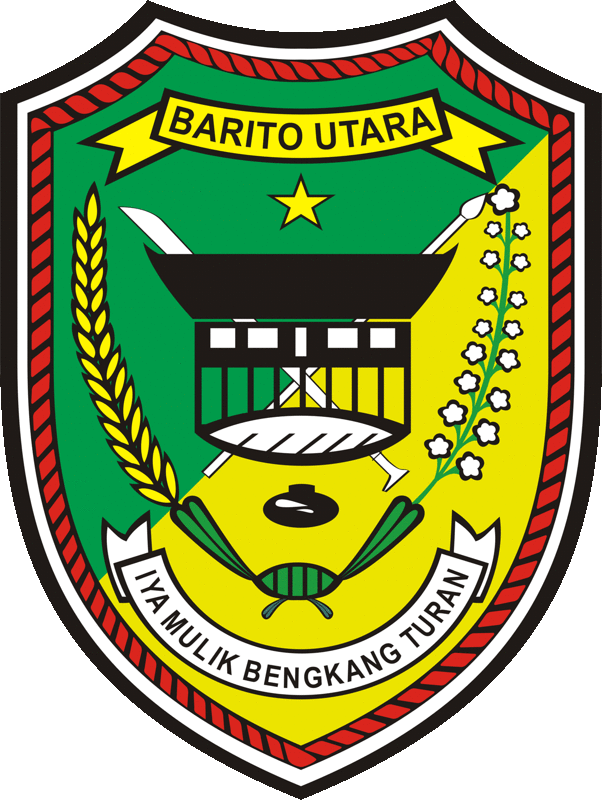
North Barito Regency

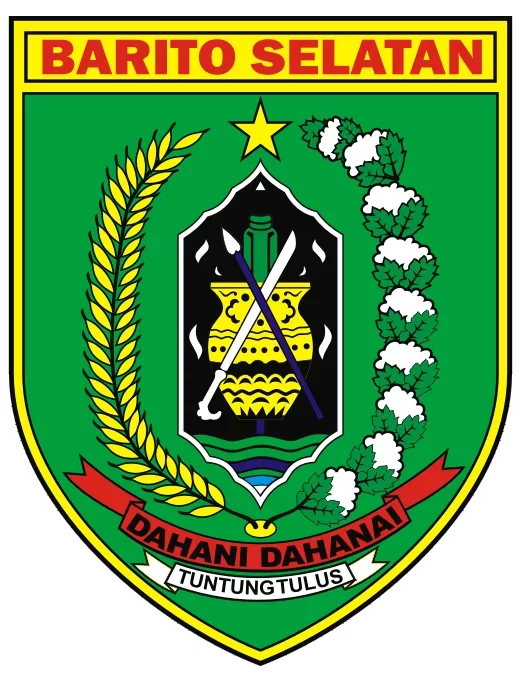
South Barito Regency

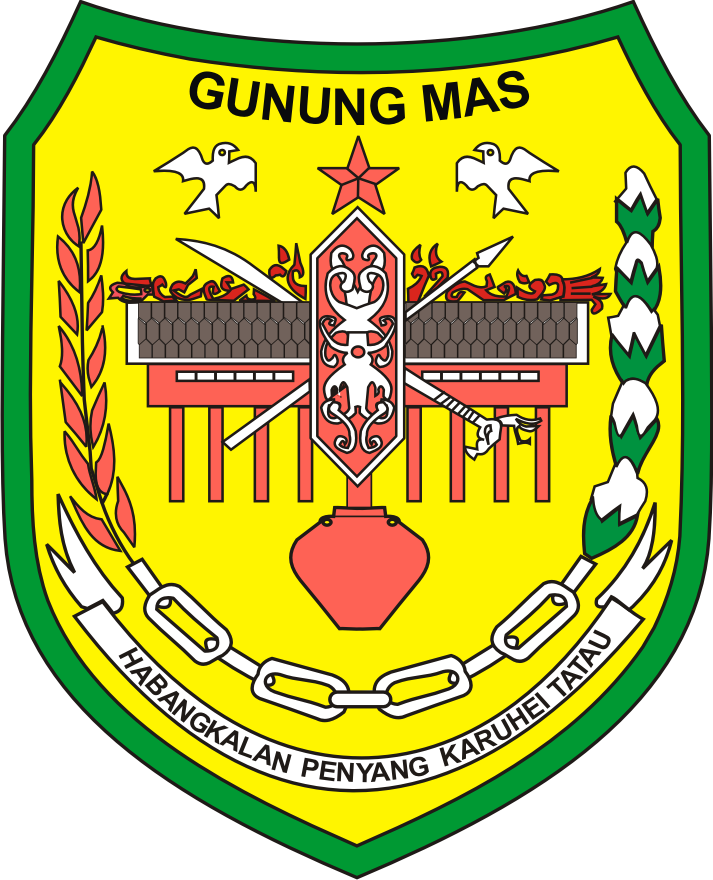
Gunung Mas Regency

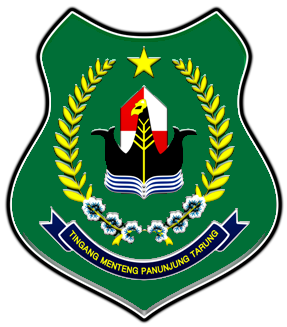
Kapuas Regency

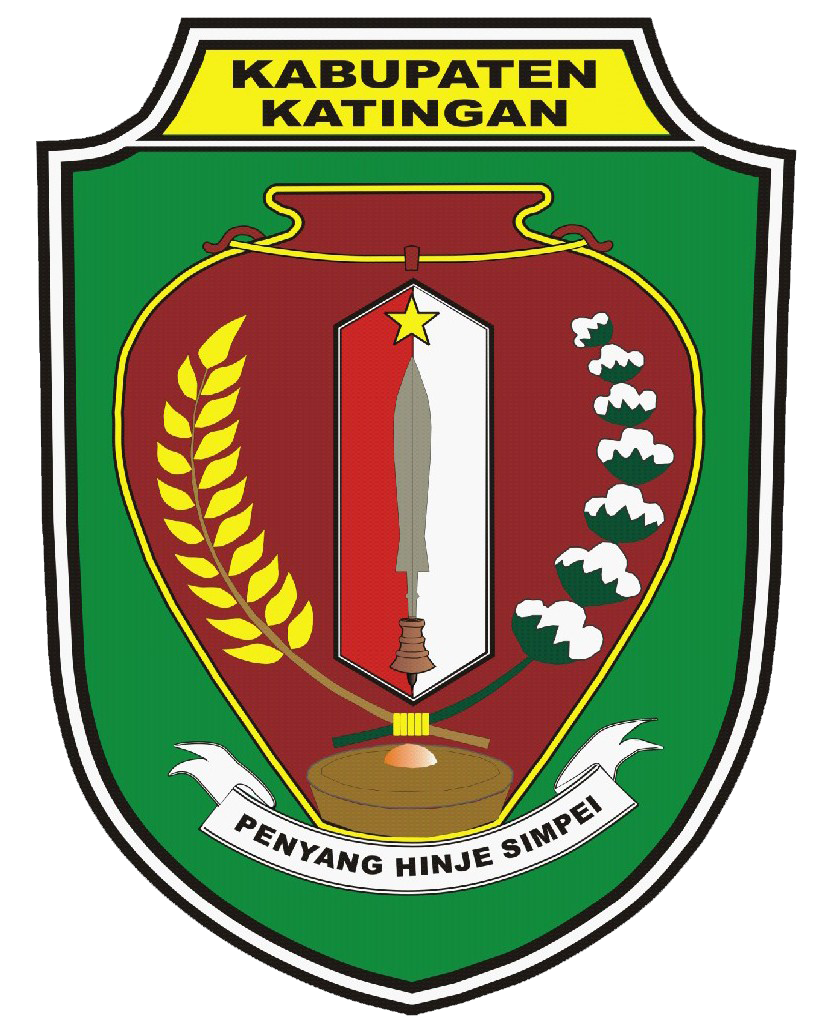
Katingan Regency

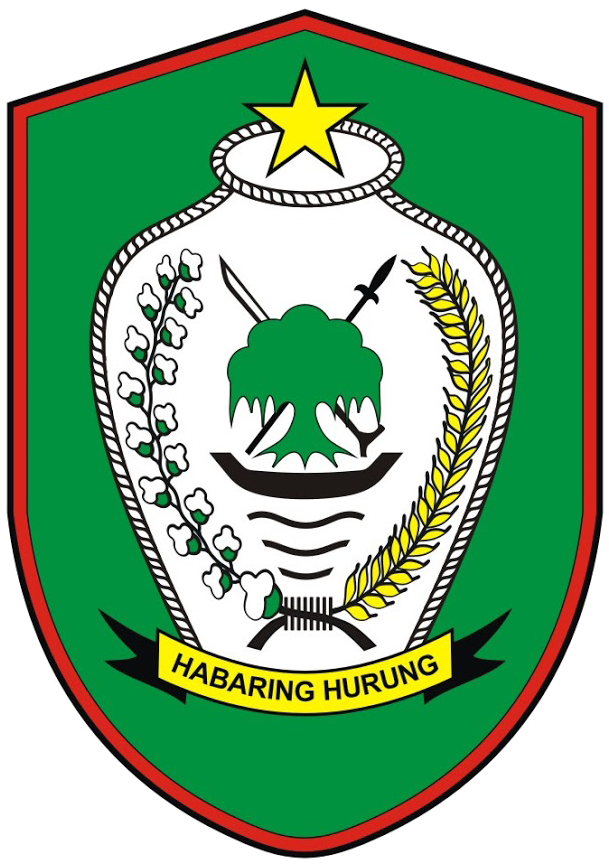
East Kotawaringin Regency

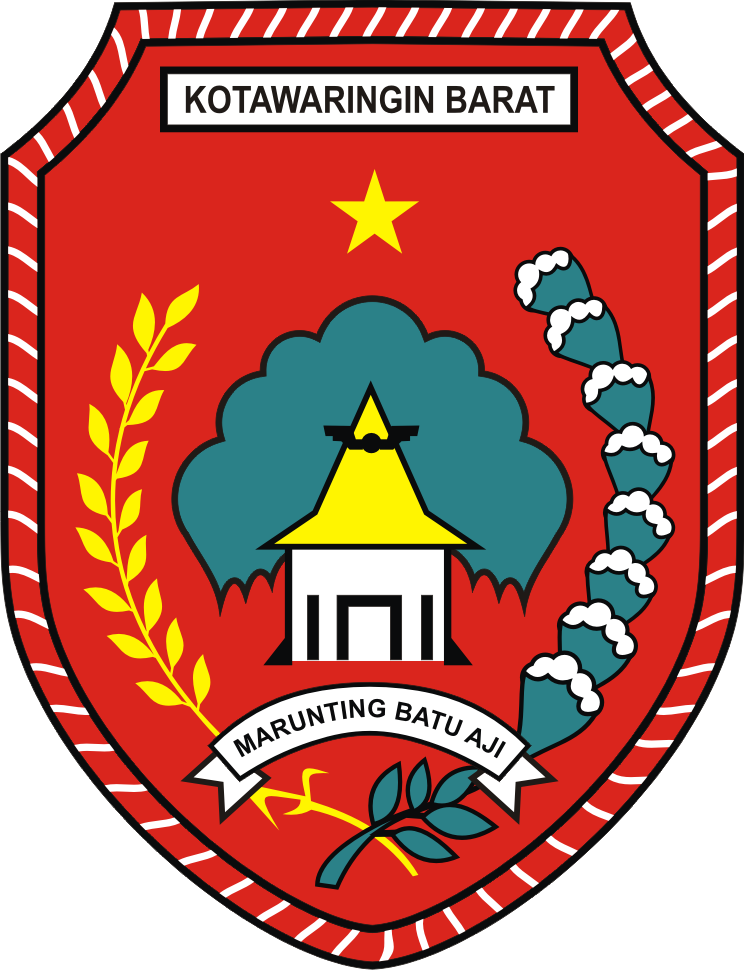
West Kotawaringin Regency

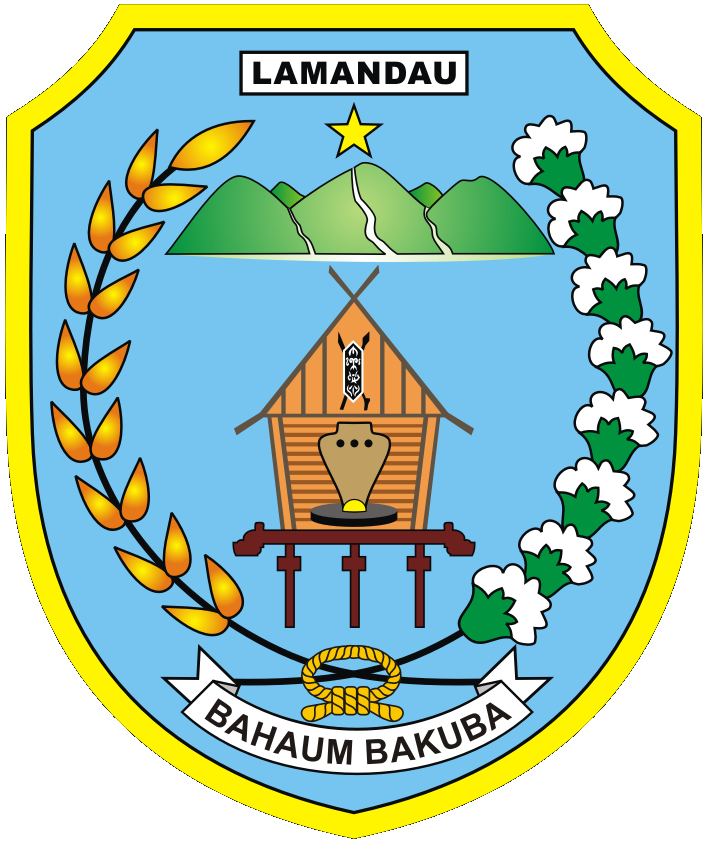
Lamandau Regency

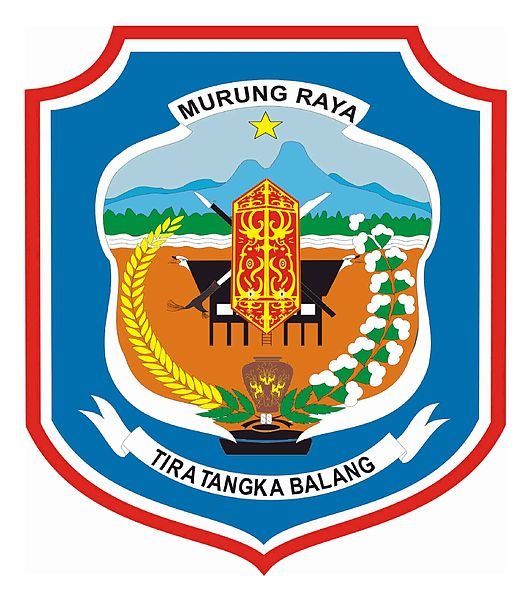
Murung Raya Regency

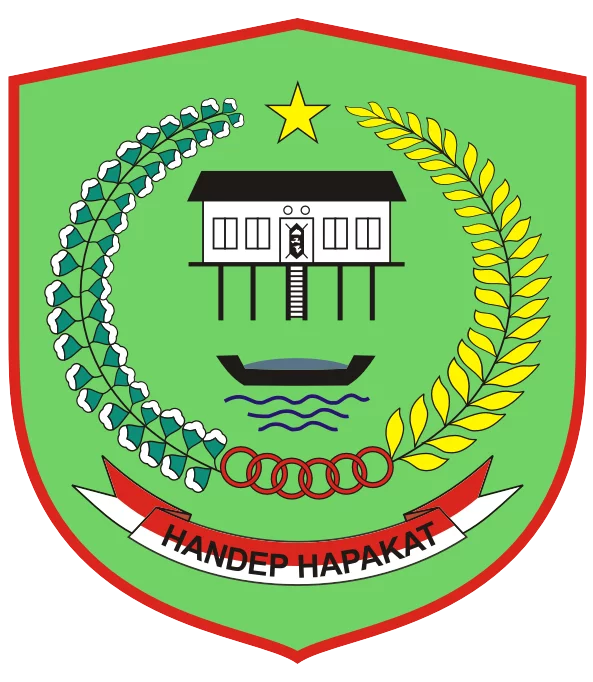
Pulang Pisau Regency

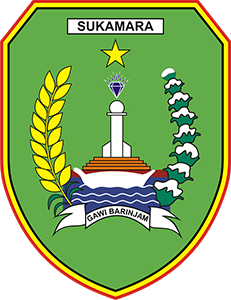
Sukamara Regency

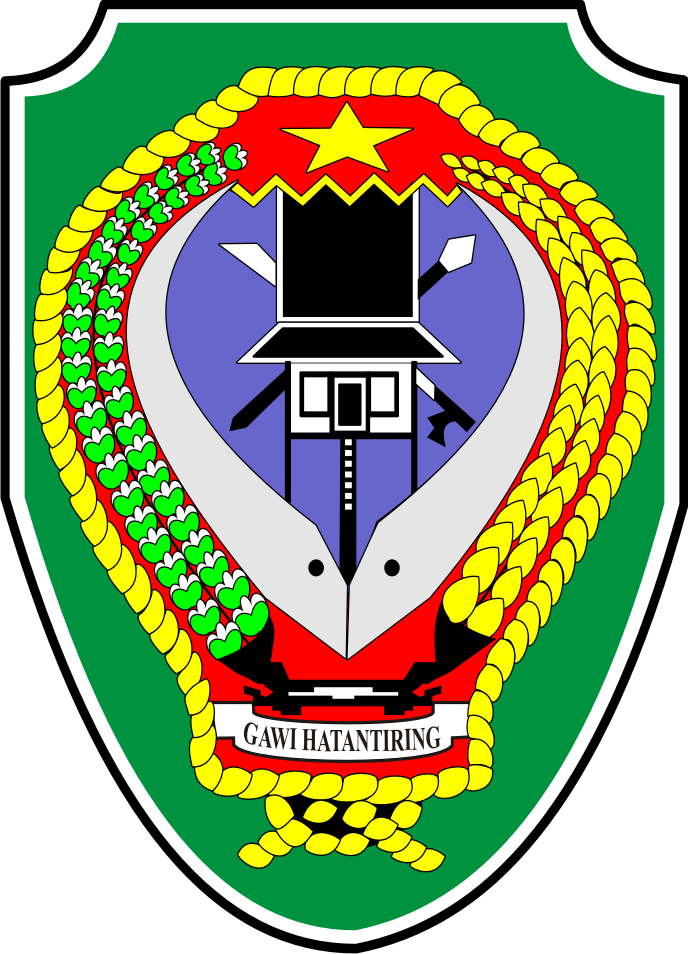
Seruyan Regency

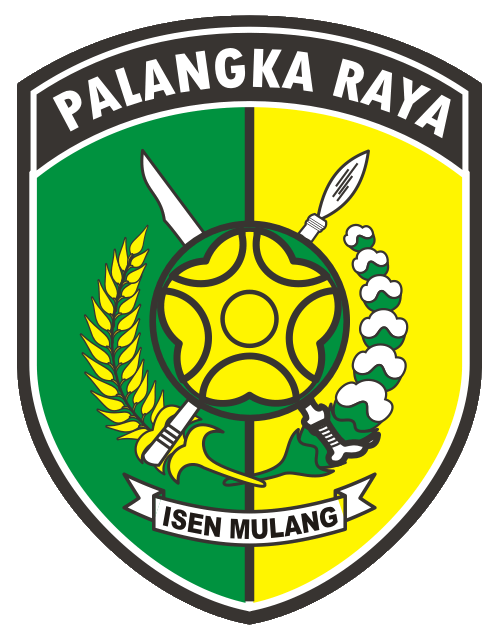
Palangka Raya City

=== South Kalimantan ===
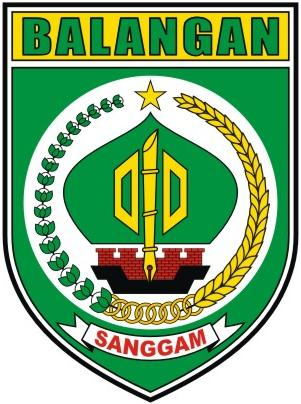
Balangan Regency

Banjar Regency

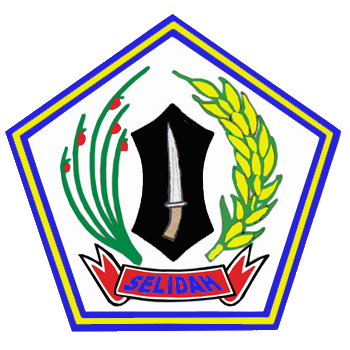
Barito Kuala Regency

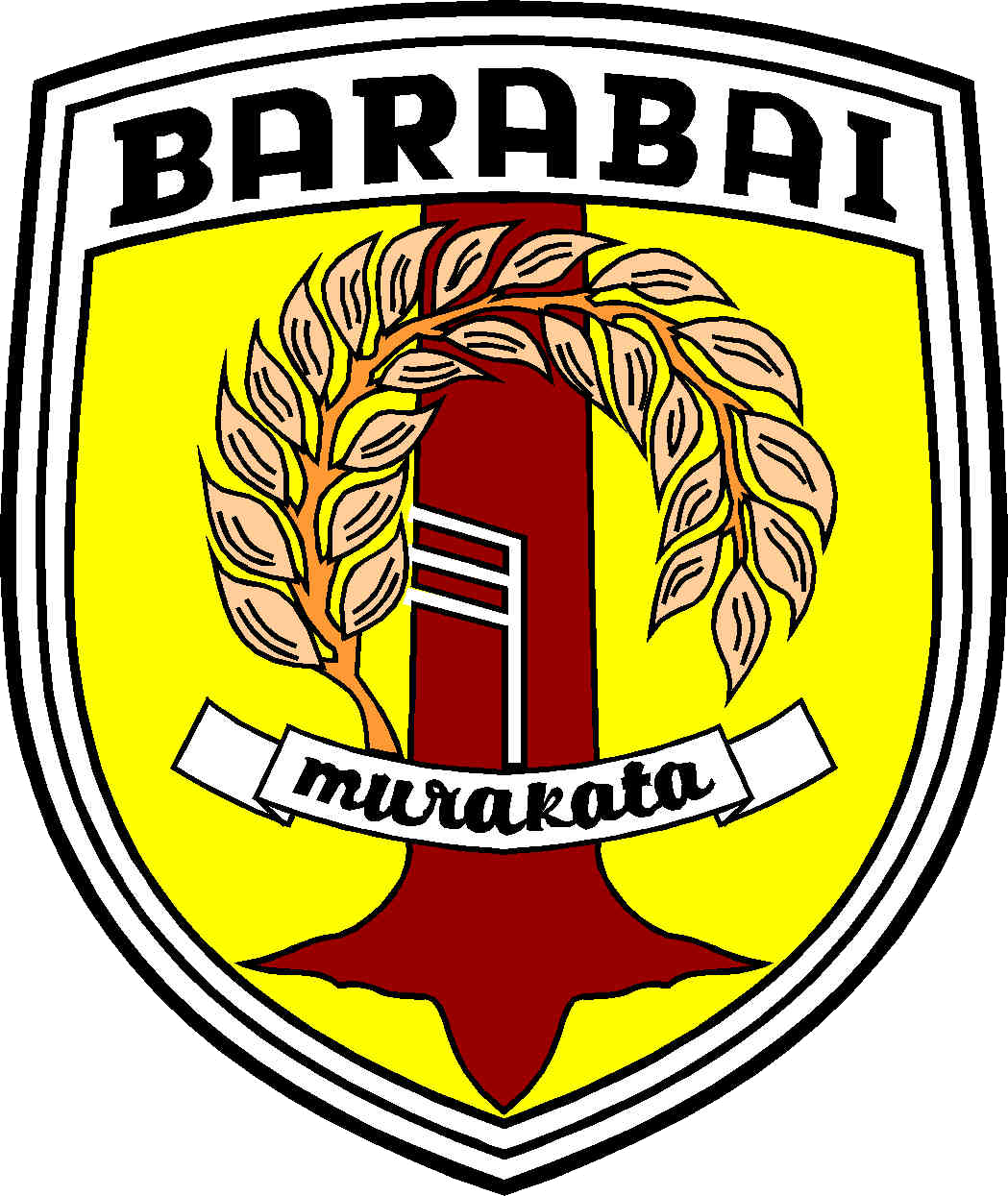
Central Hulu Sungai Regency

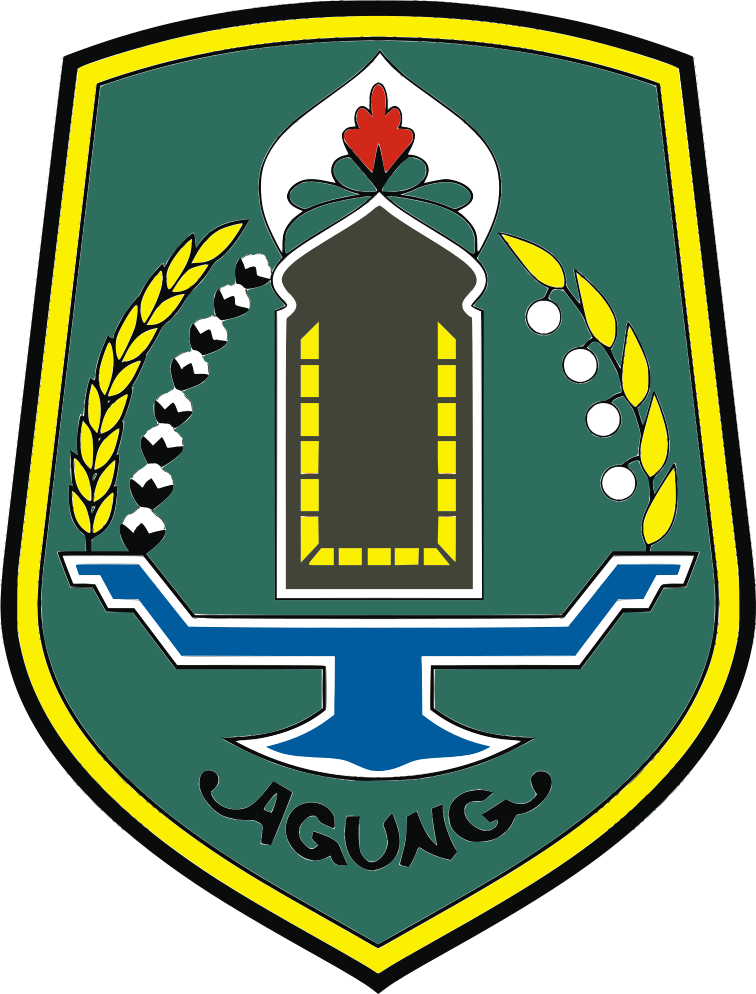
North Hulu Sungai Regency

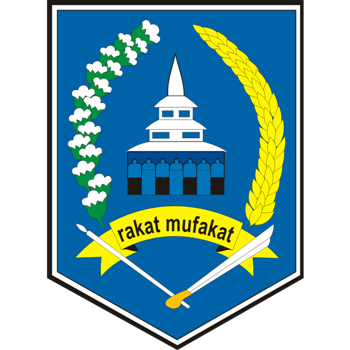
South Hulu Sungai Regency

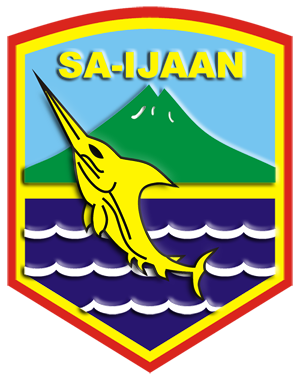
Kotabaru Regency

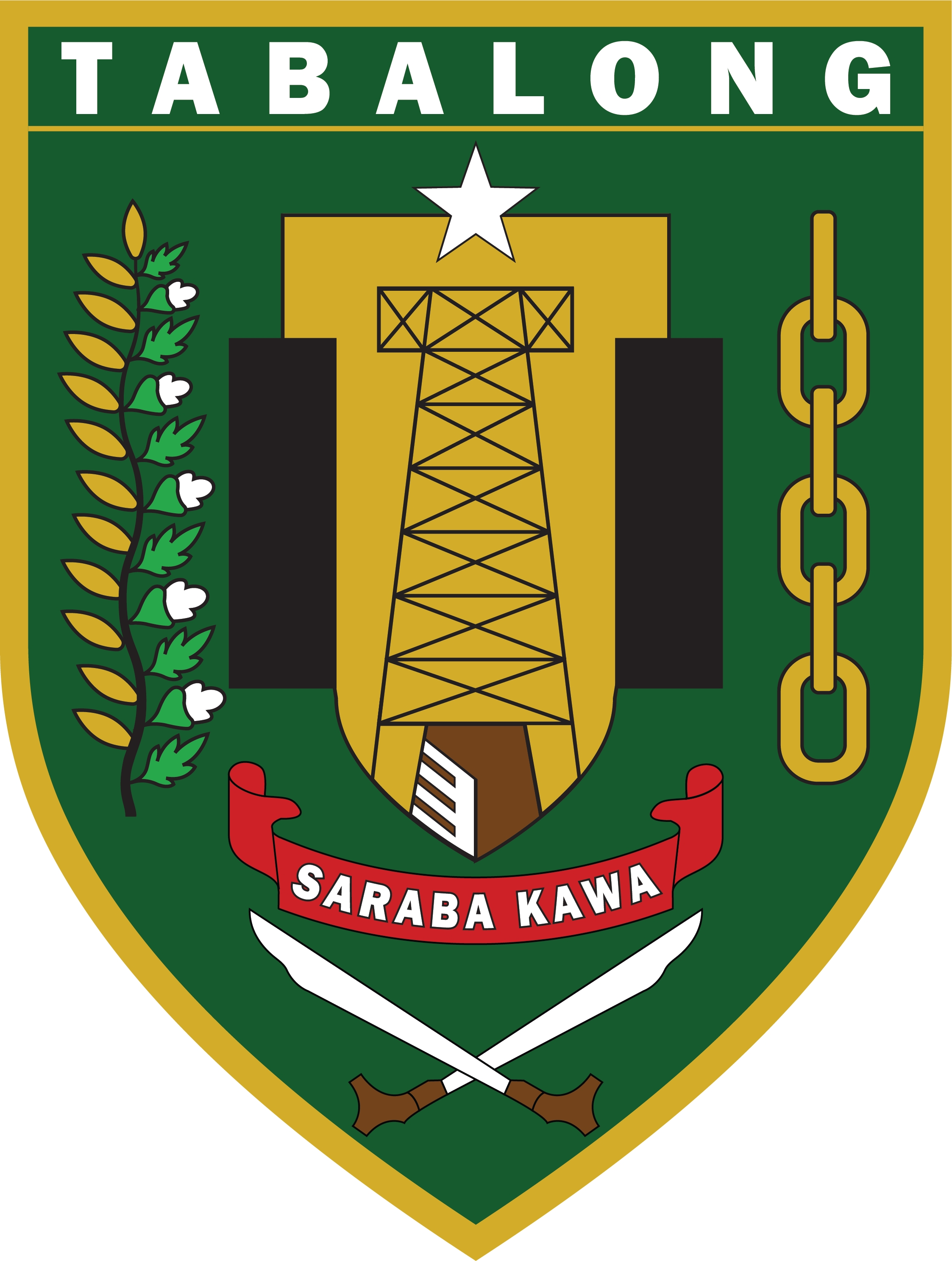
Tabalong Regency

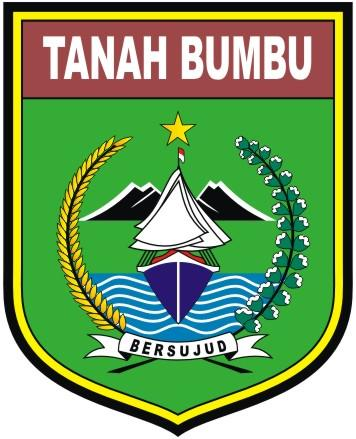
Tanah Bumbu Regency

Tanah Laut Regency

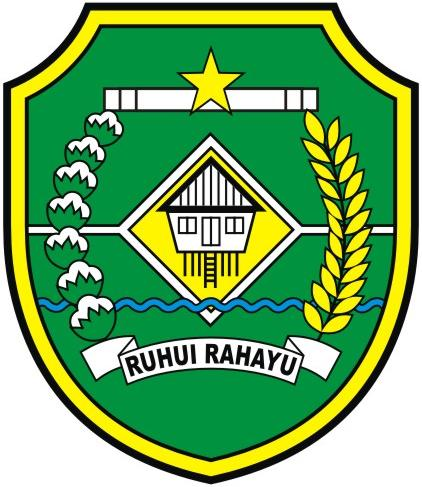
Tapin Regency

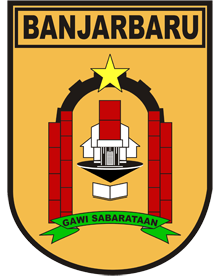
Banjarbaru City

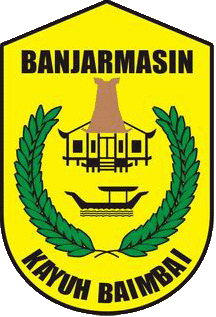
Banjarmasin City

=== East Kalimantan ===
Berau Regency

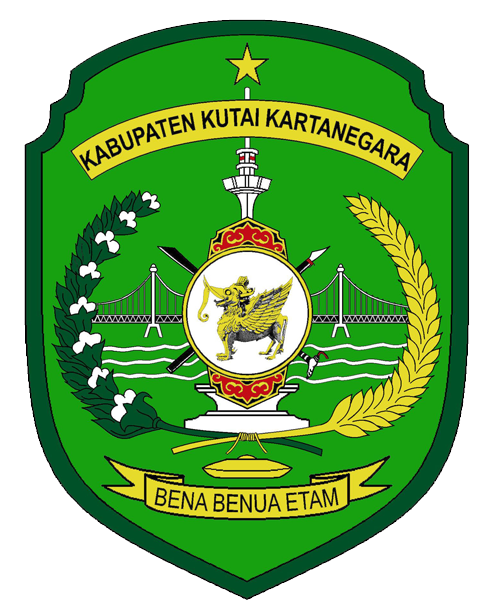
Kutai Kartanegara Regency

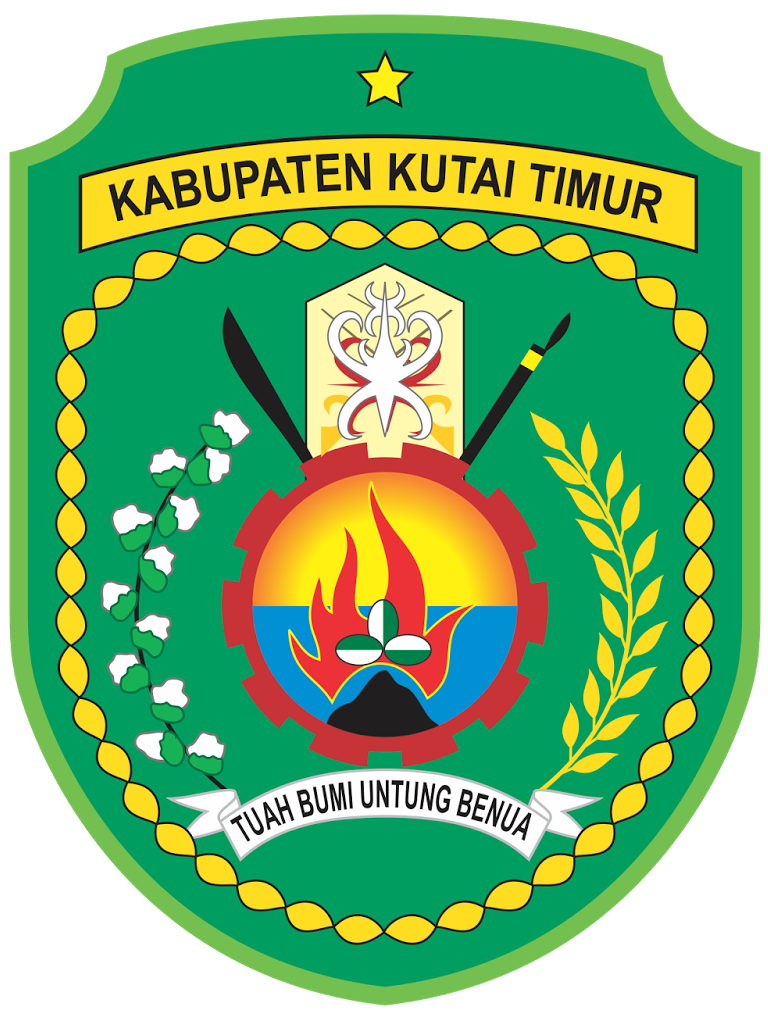
East Kutai Regency

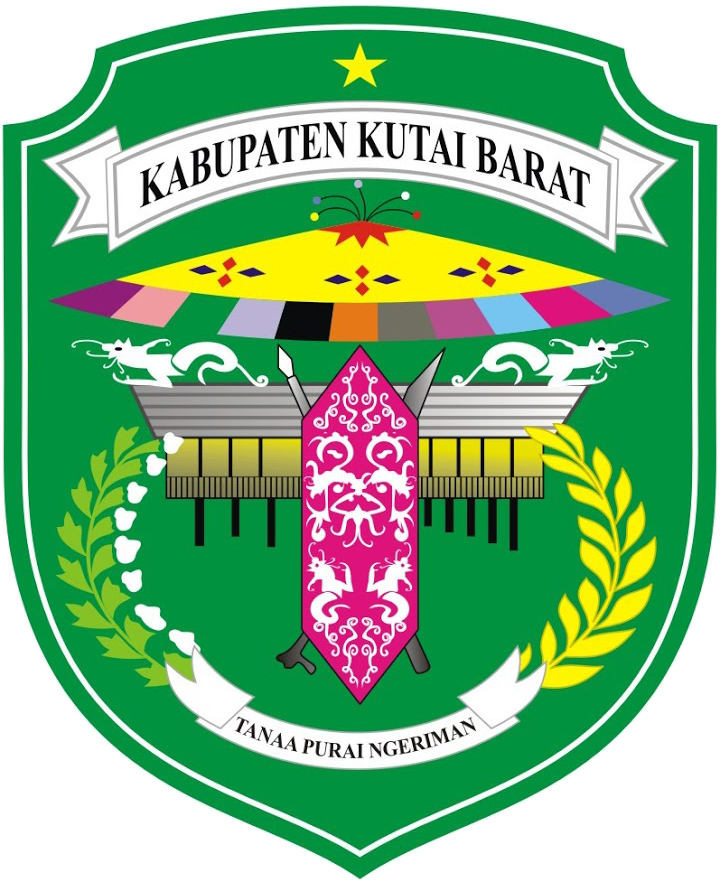
West Kutai Regency

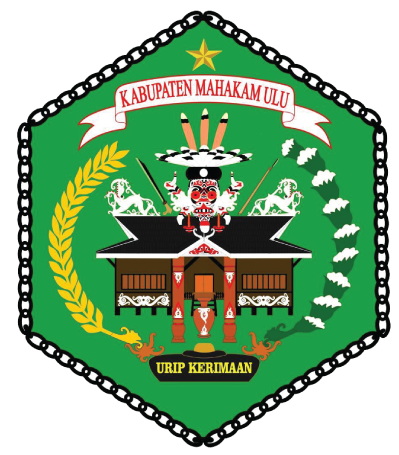
Mahakam Ulu Regency

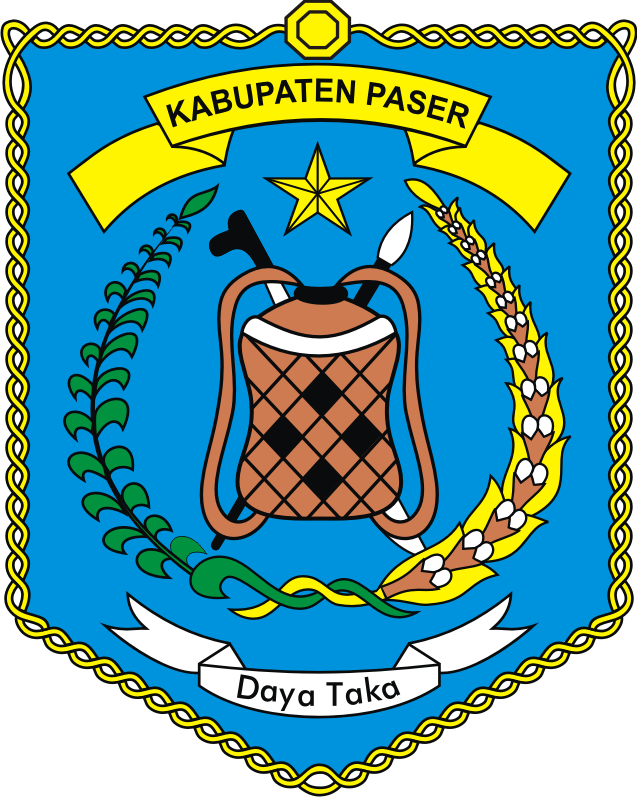
Paser Regency

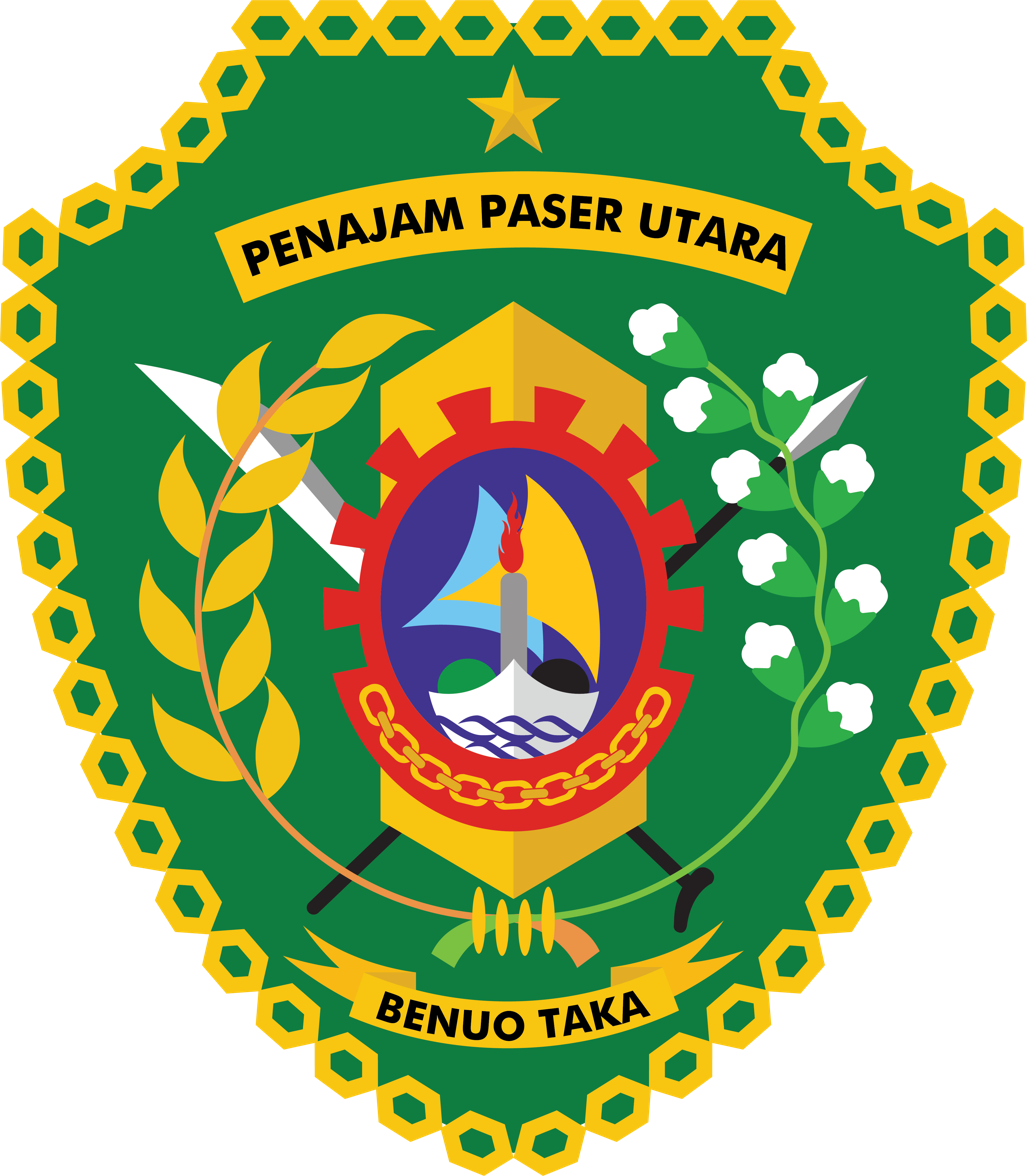
Penajam North Paser Regency

Balikpapan City

Bontang City

Samarinda City

=== North Kalimantan ===
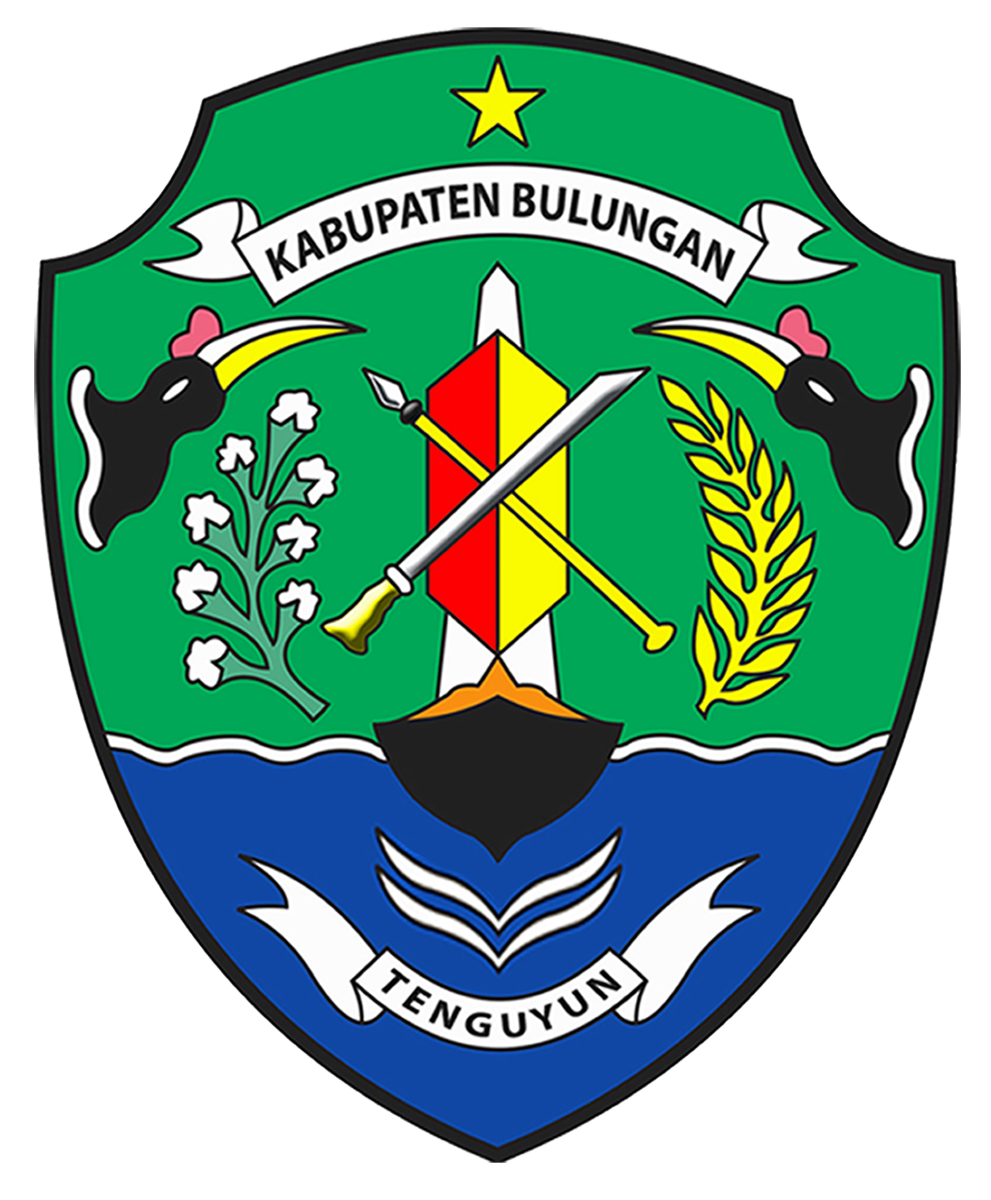
Bulungan Regency

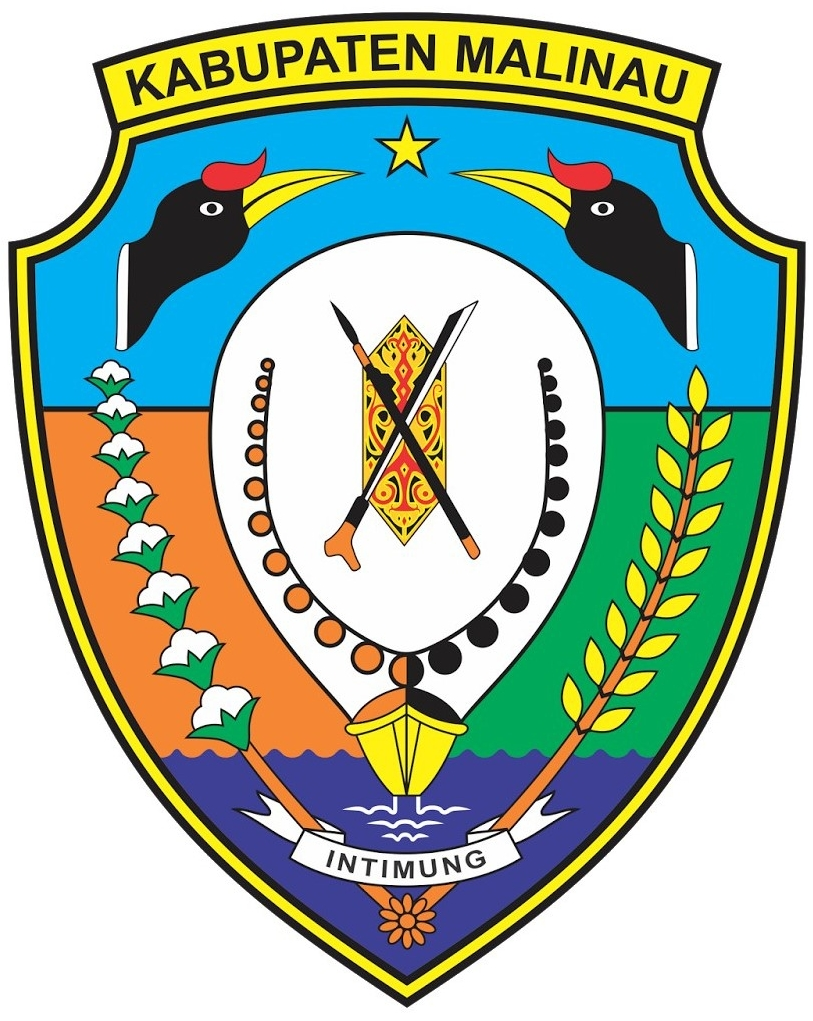
Malinau Regency

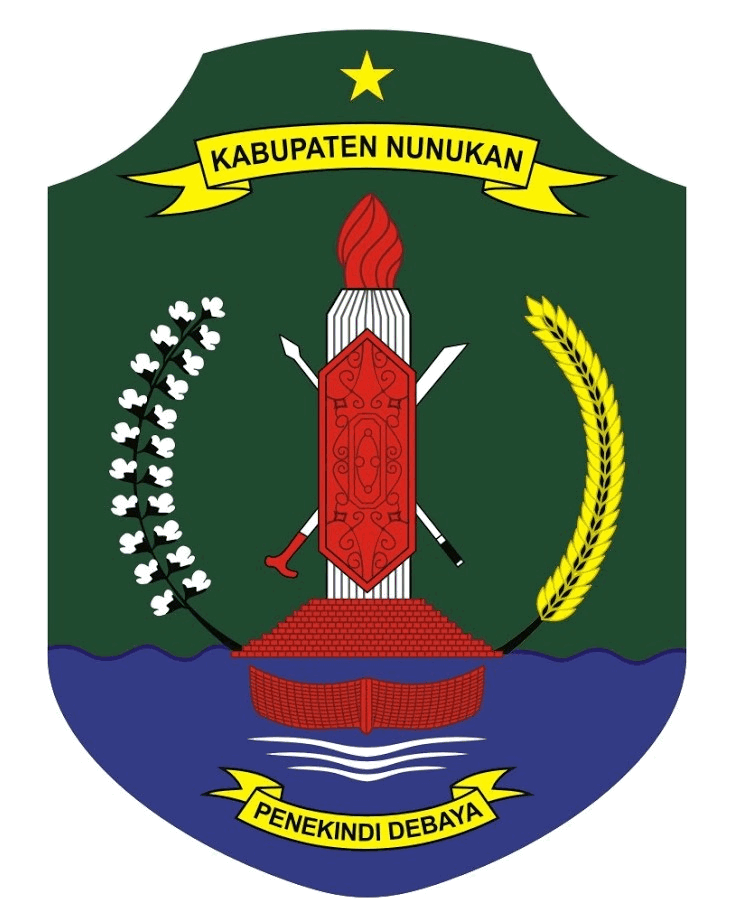
Nunukan Regency

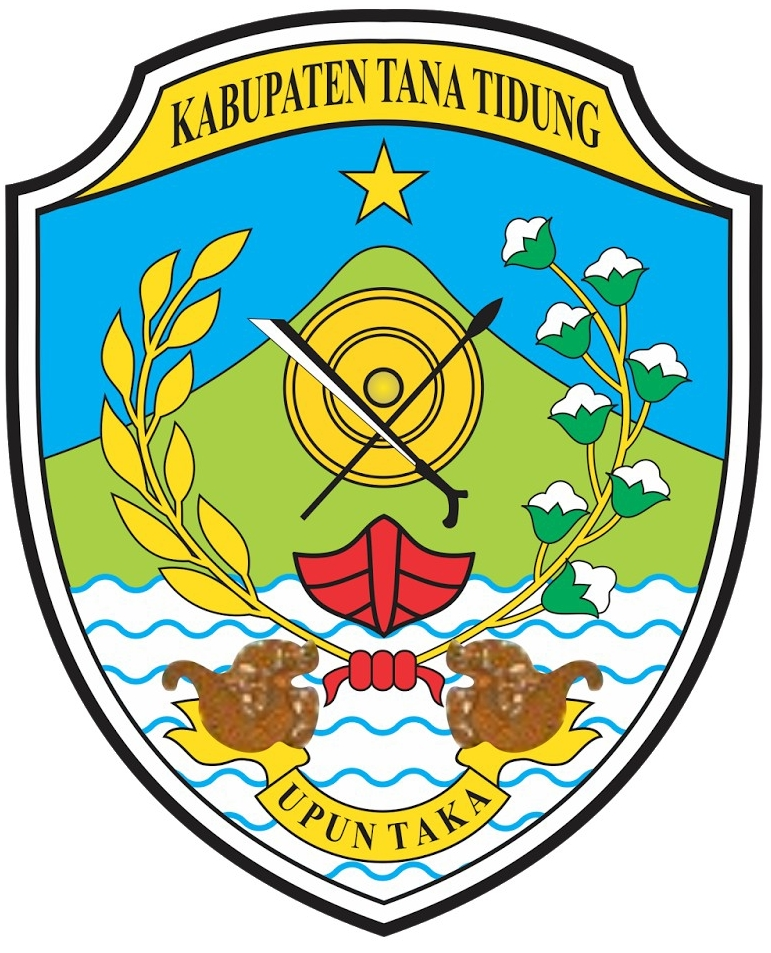
Tana Tidung Regency

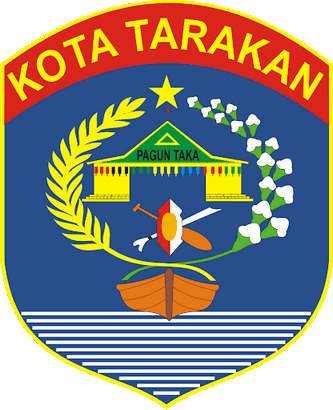
Tarakan City

=== West Sulawesi ===
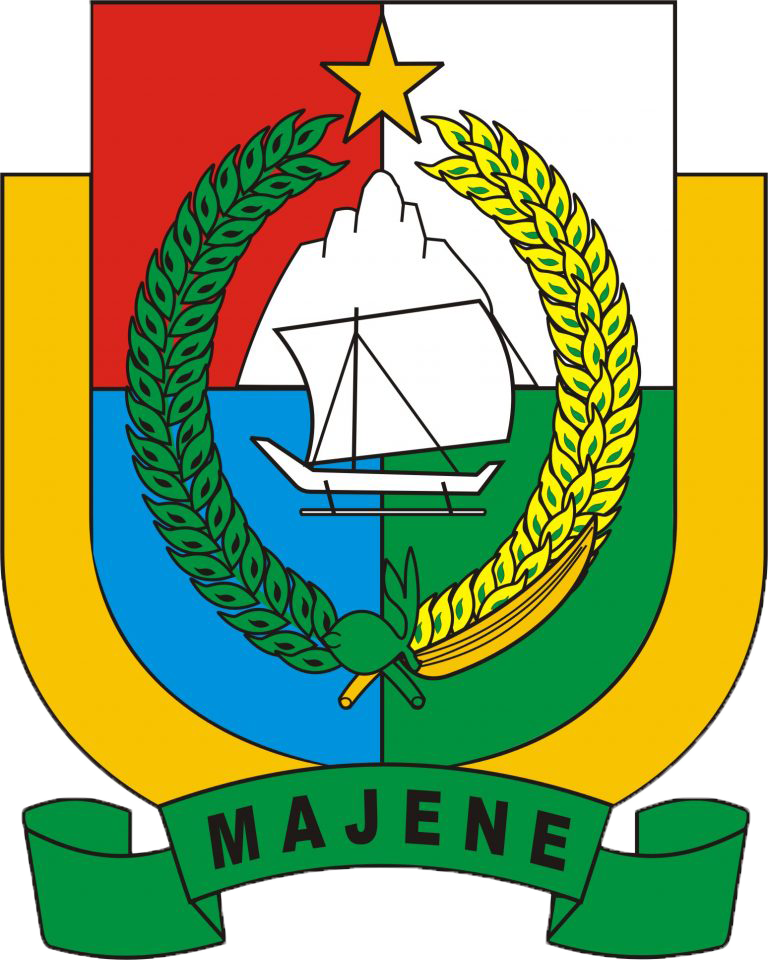
Majene Regency

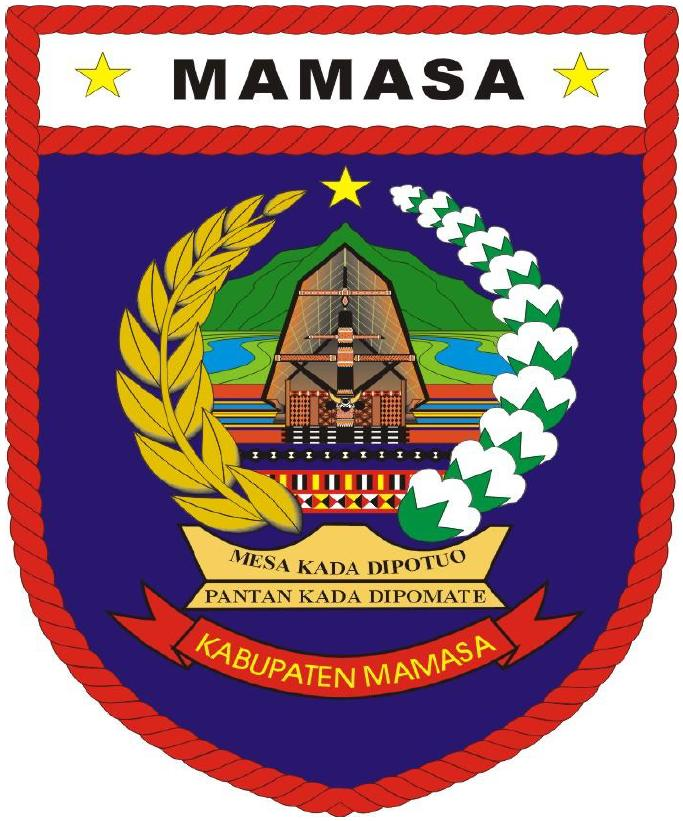
Mamasa Regency

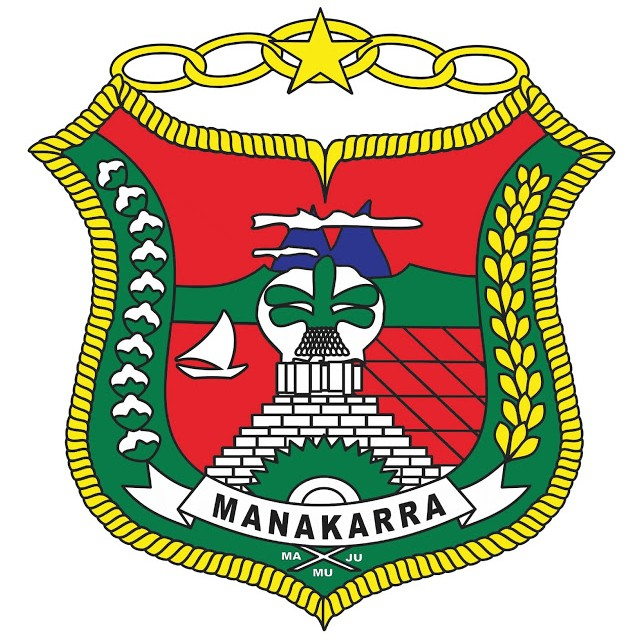
Mamuju Regency

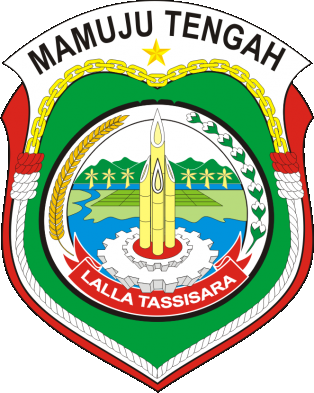
Central Mamuju Regency

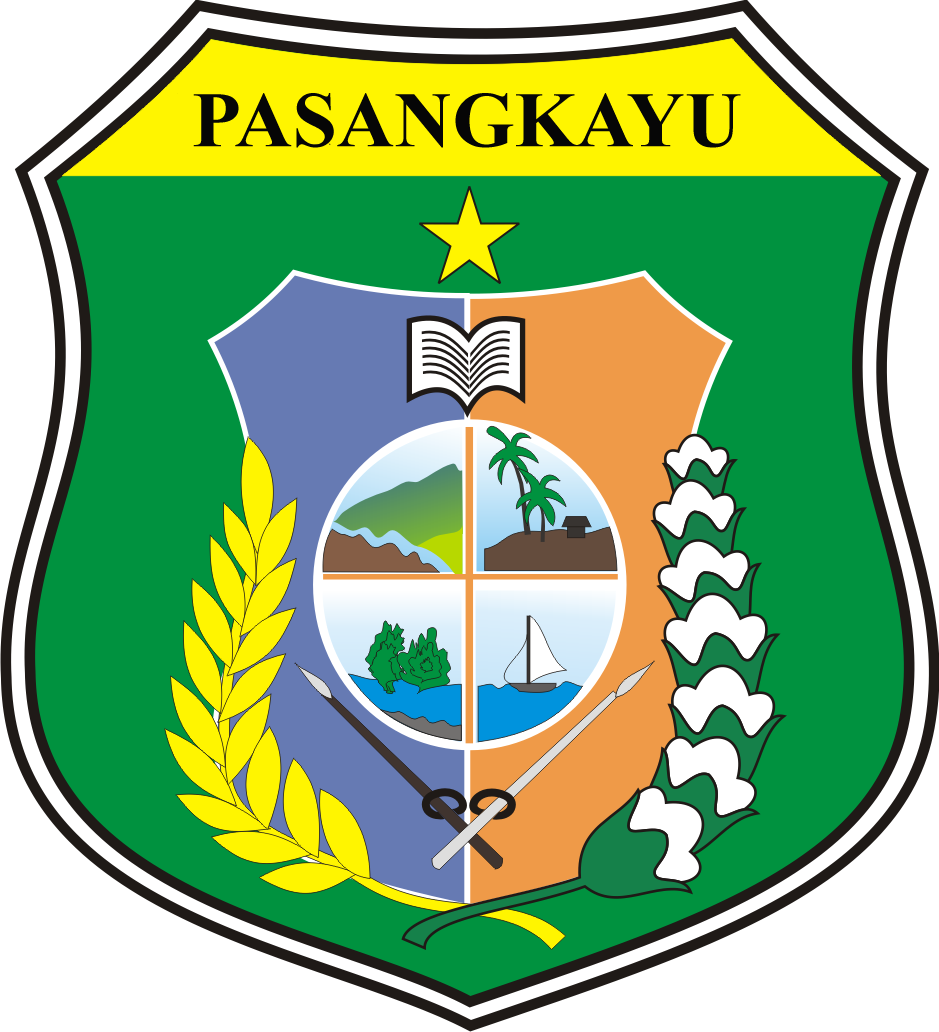
Pasangkayu Regency

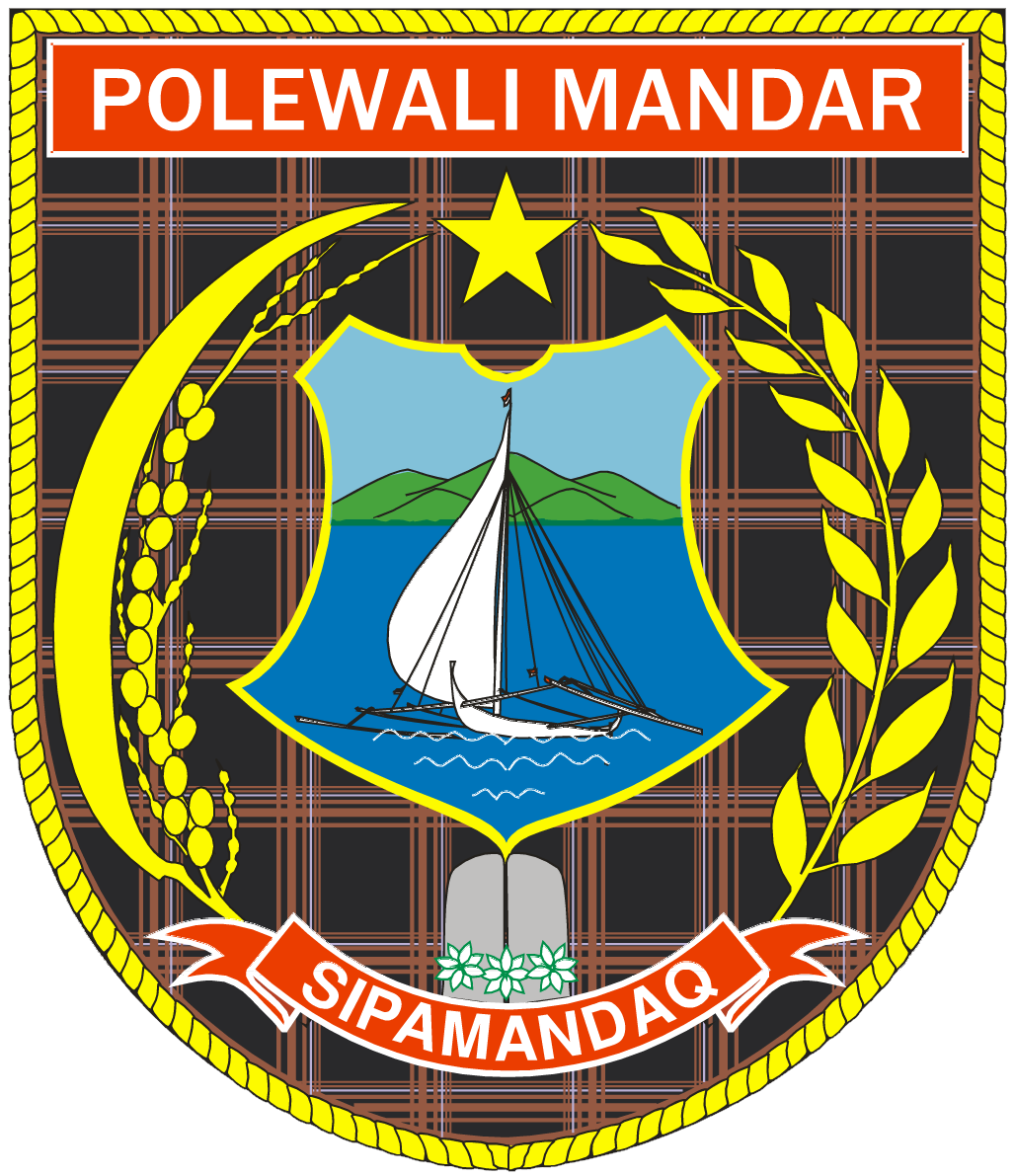
Polewali Mandar Regency

=== South Sulawesi ===
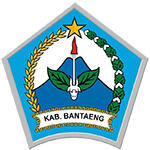
Bantaeng Regency

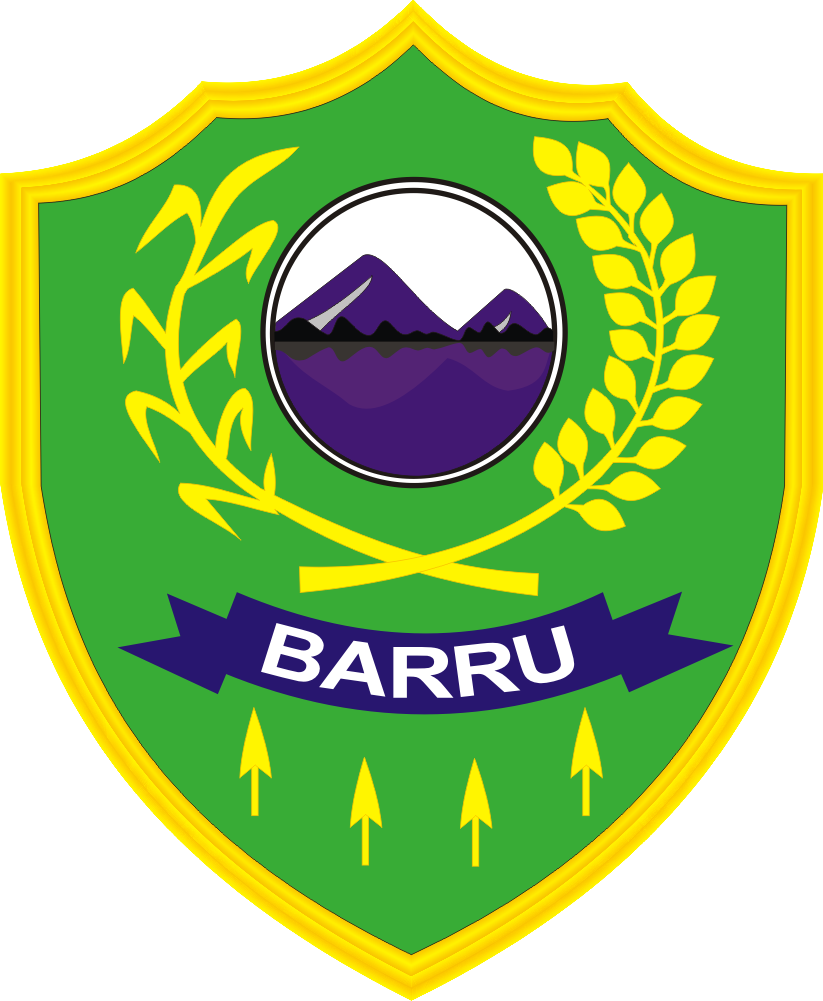
Barru Regency

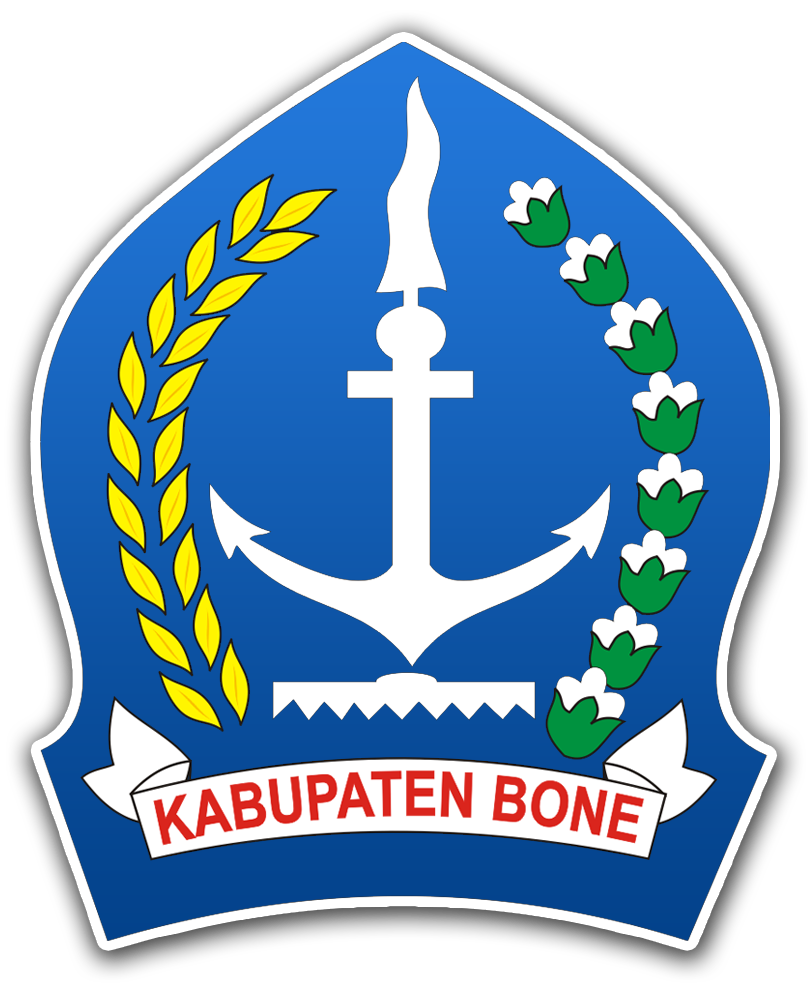
Bone Regency

Bulukumba Regency

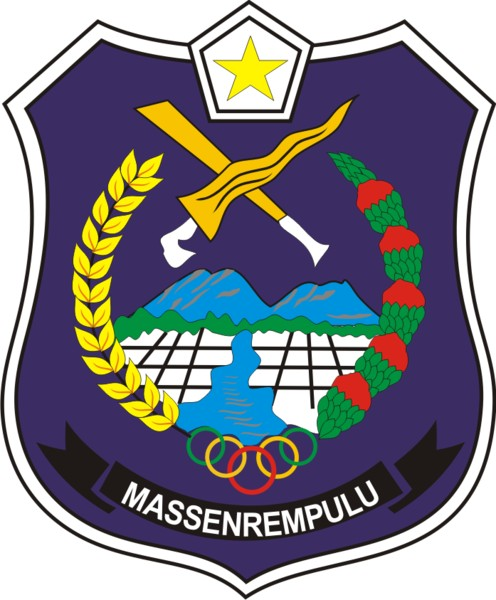
Enrekang Regency

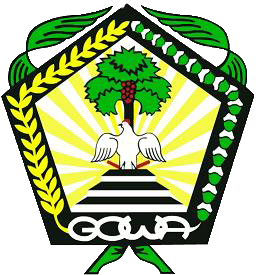
Gowa Regency

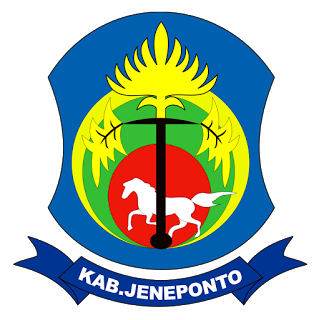
Jeneponto Regency

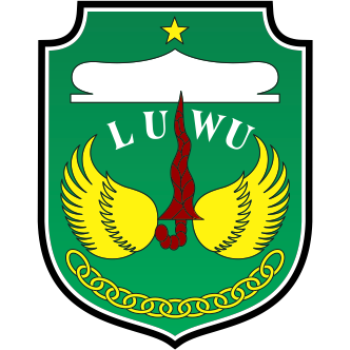
Luwu Regency

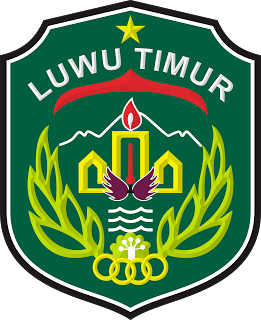
East Luwu Regency

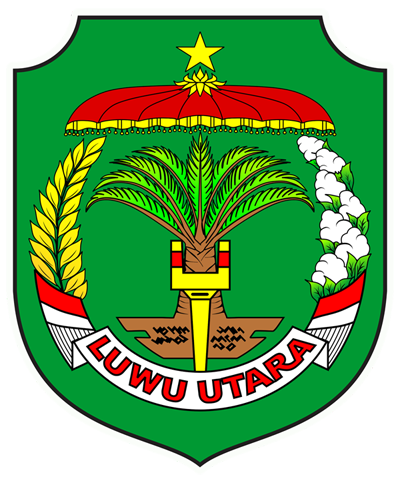
North Luwu Regency

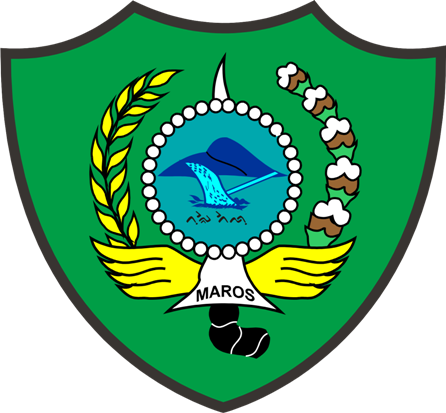
Maros Regency

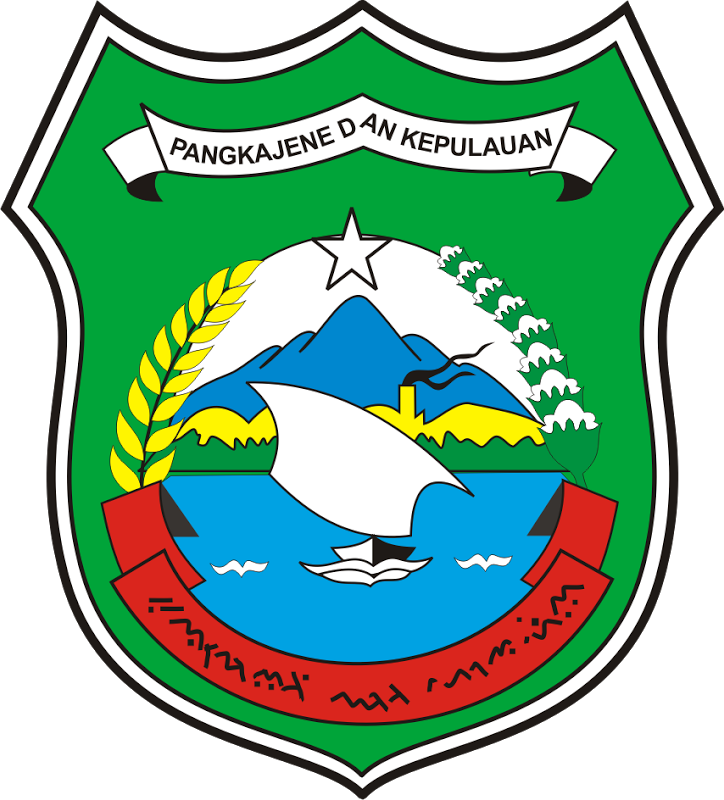
Pangkajene and Islands (Pangkep) Regency

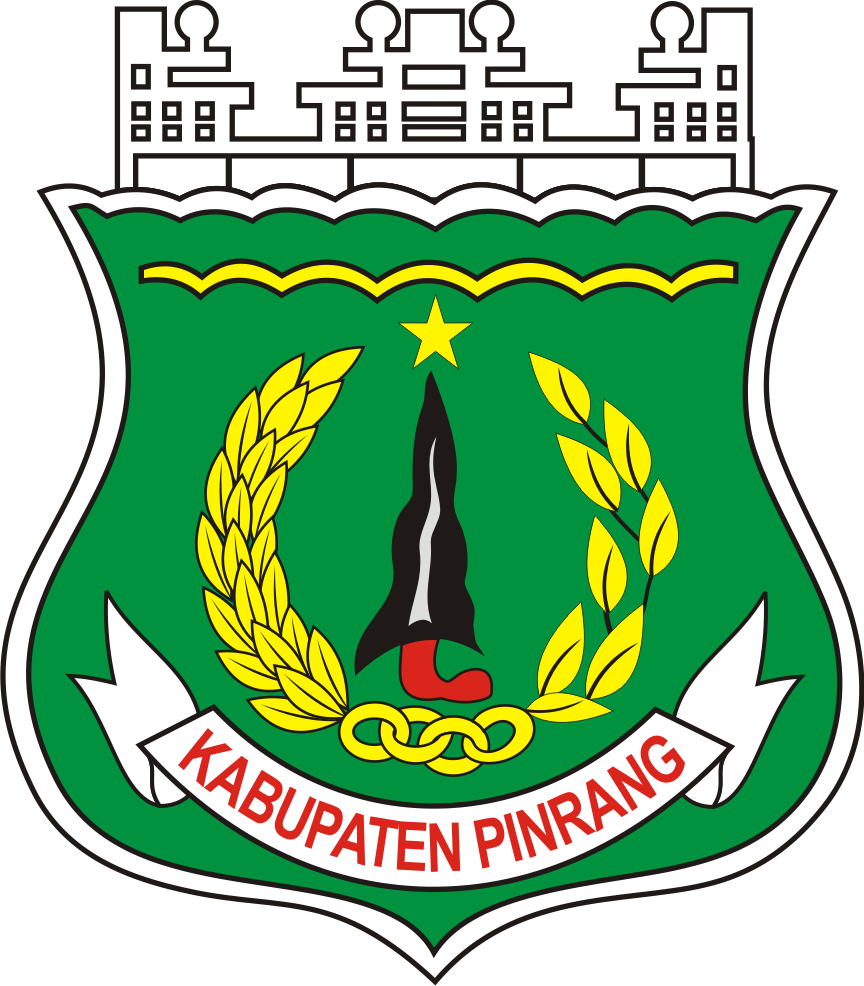
Pinrang Regency

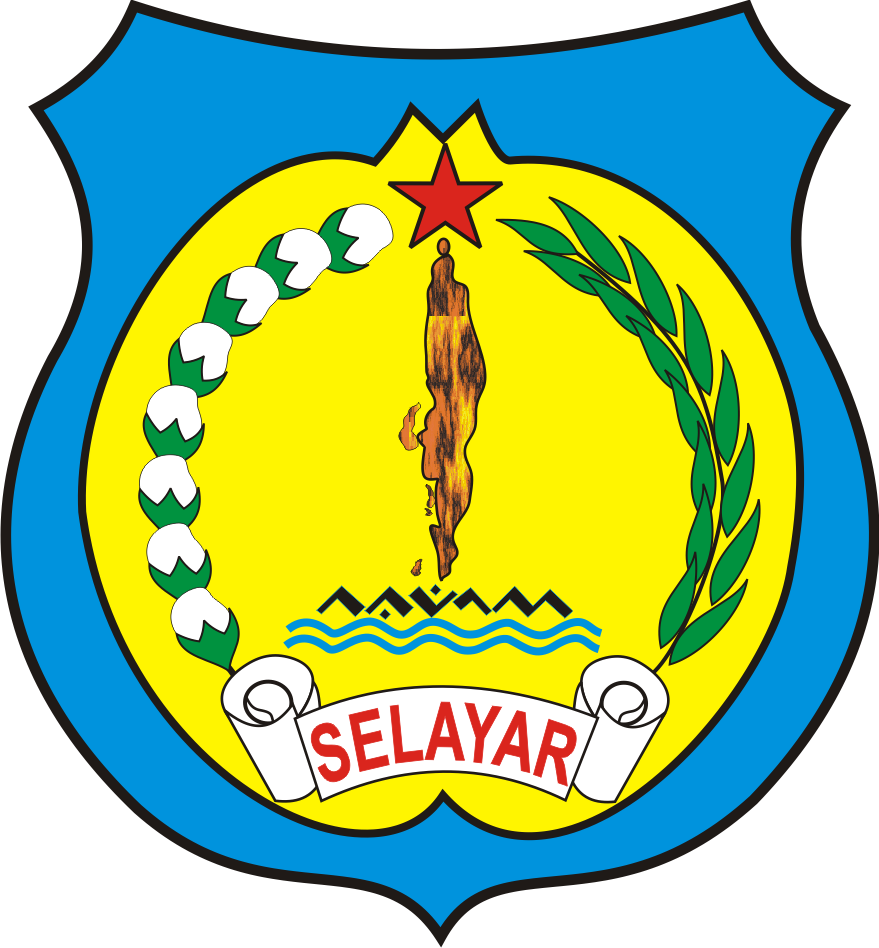
Selayar Islands Regency

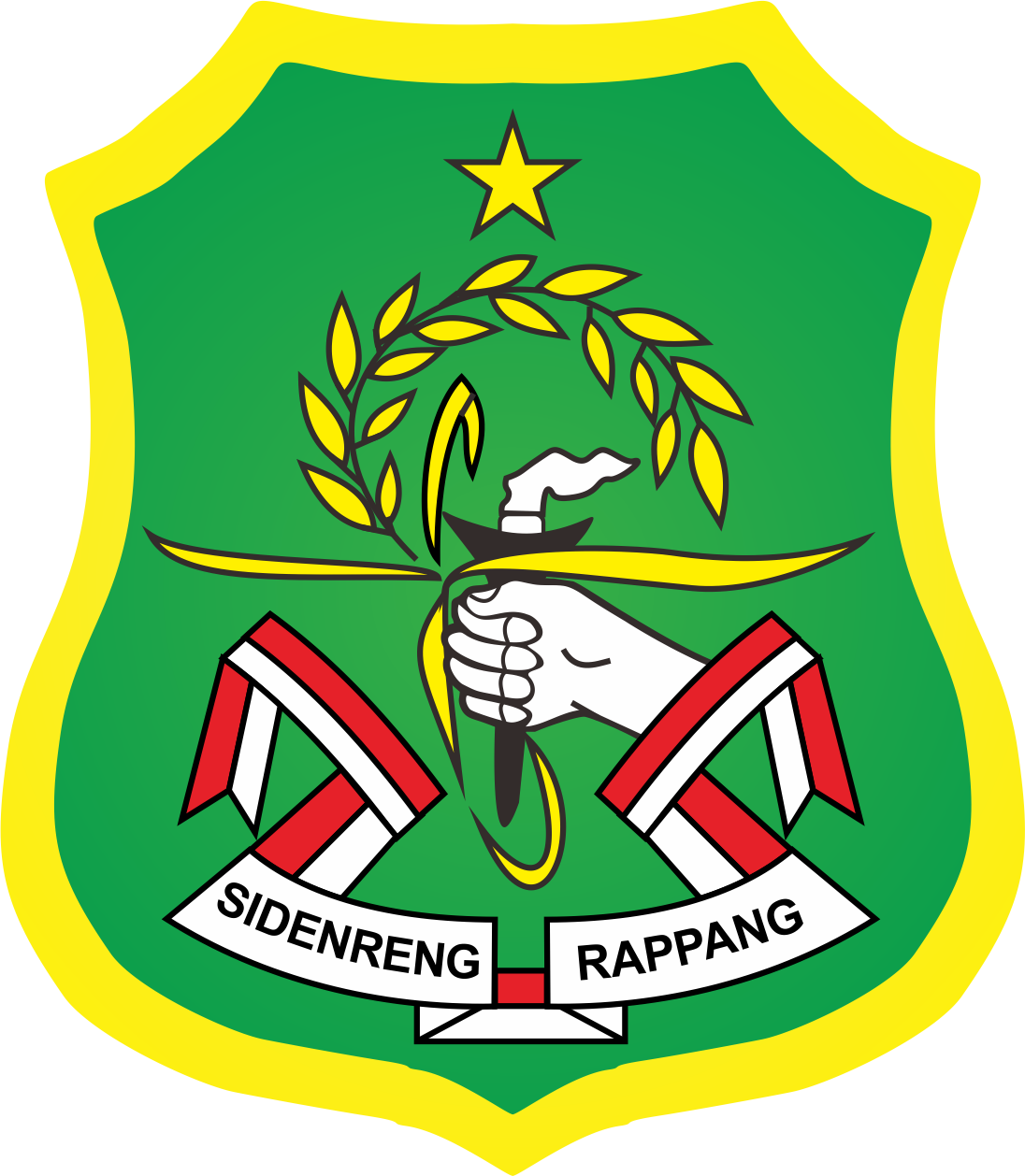
Sidenreng Rappang (Sidrap) Regency

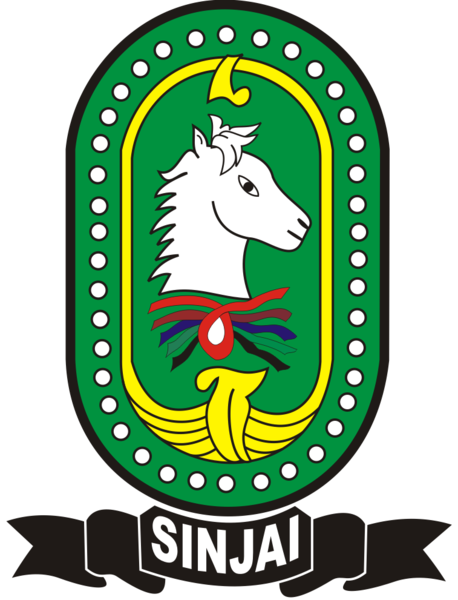
Sinjai Regency

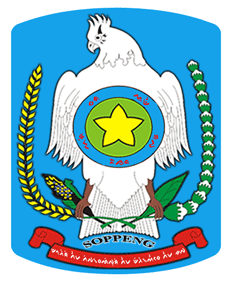
Soppeng Regency

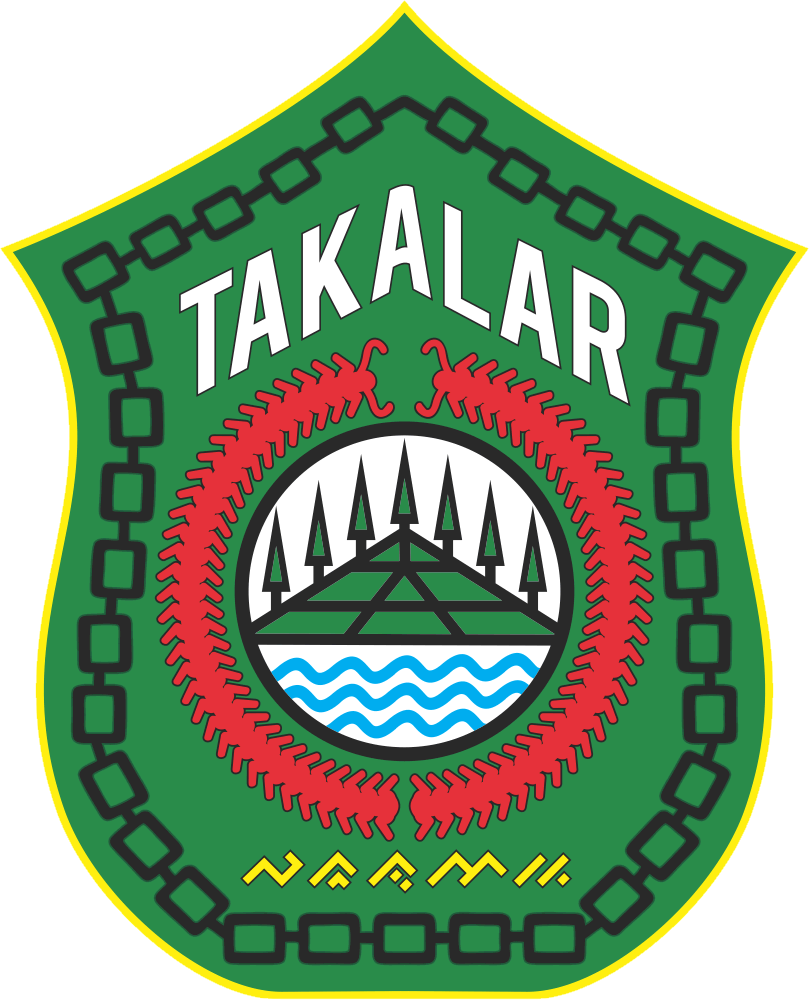
Takalar Regency

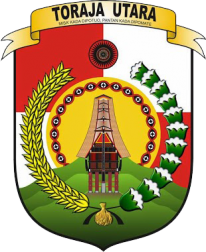
North Toraja Regency

Tana Toraja Regency

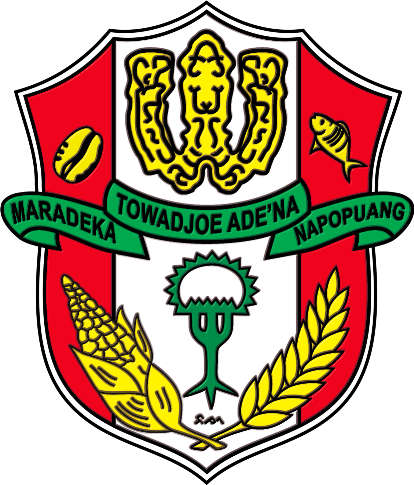
Wajo Regency

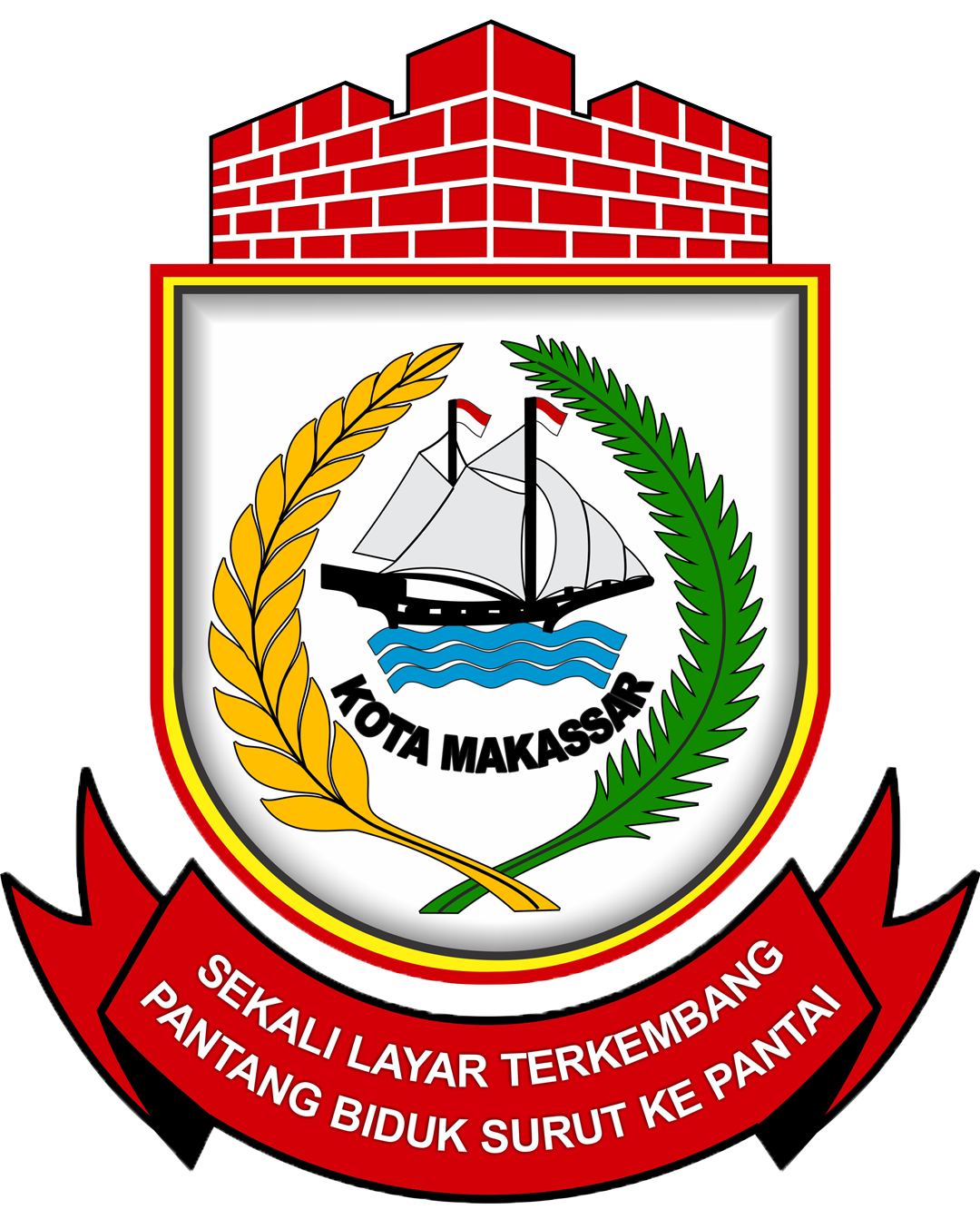
Makassar City

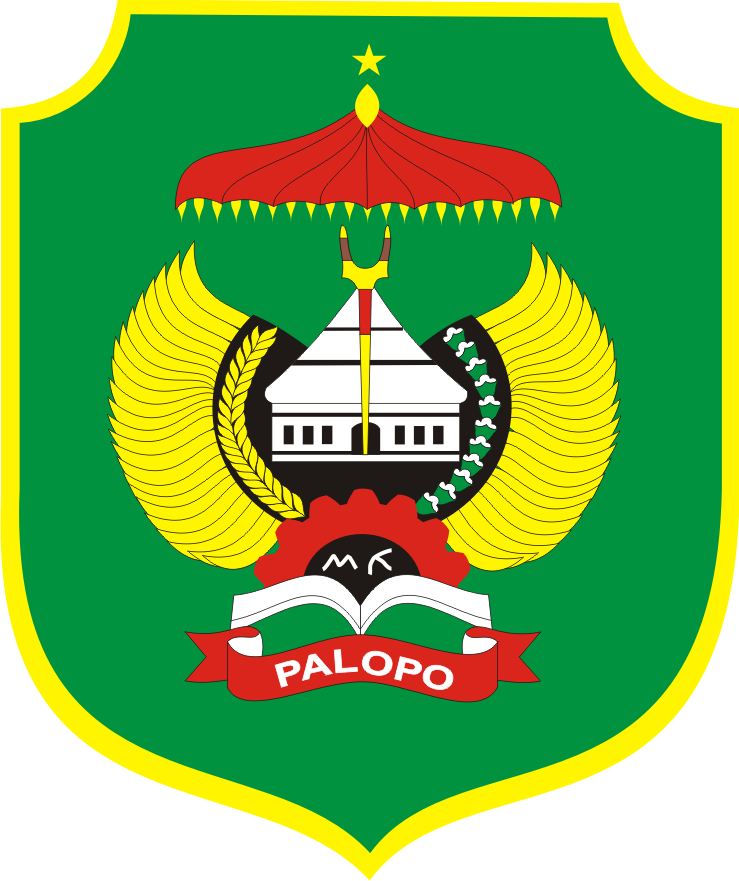
Palopo City

Parepare City

=== Southeast Sulawesi ===
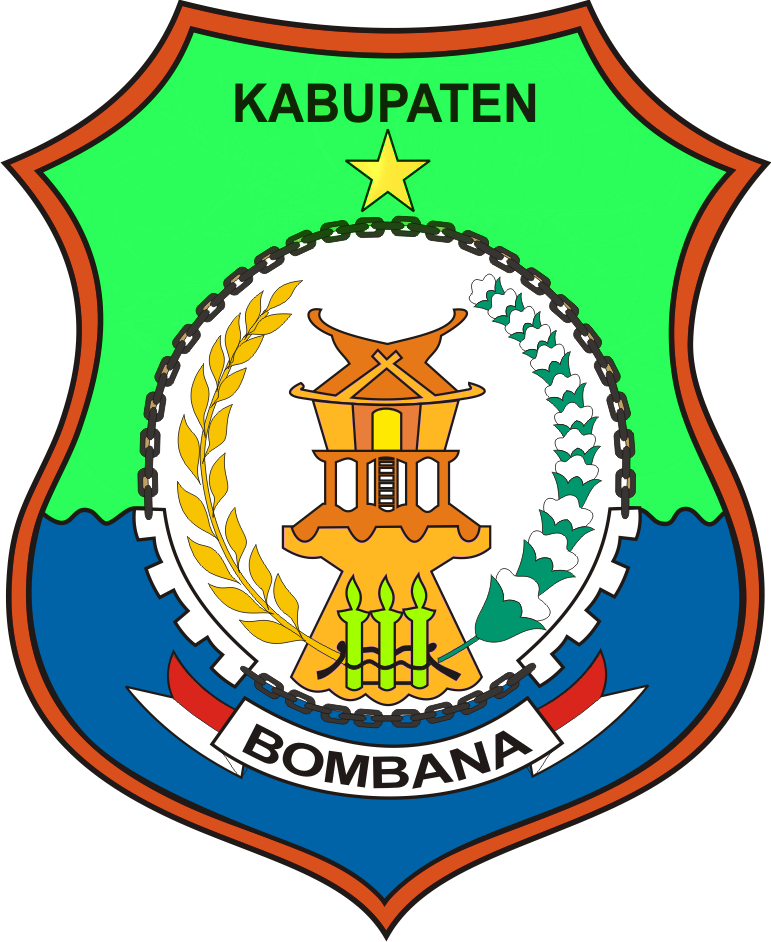
Bombana Regency

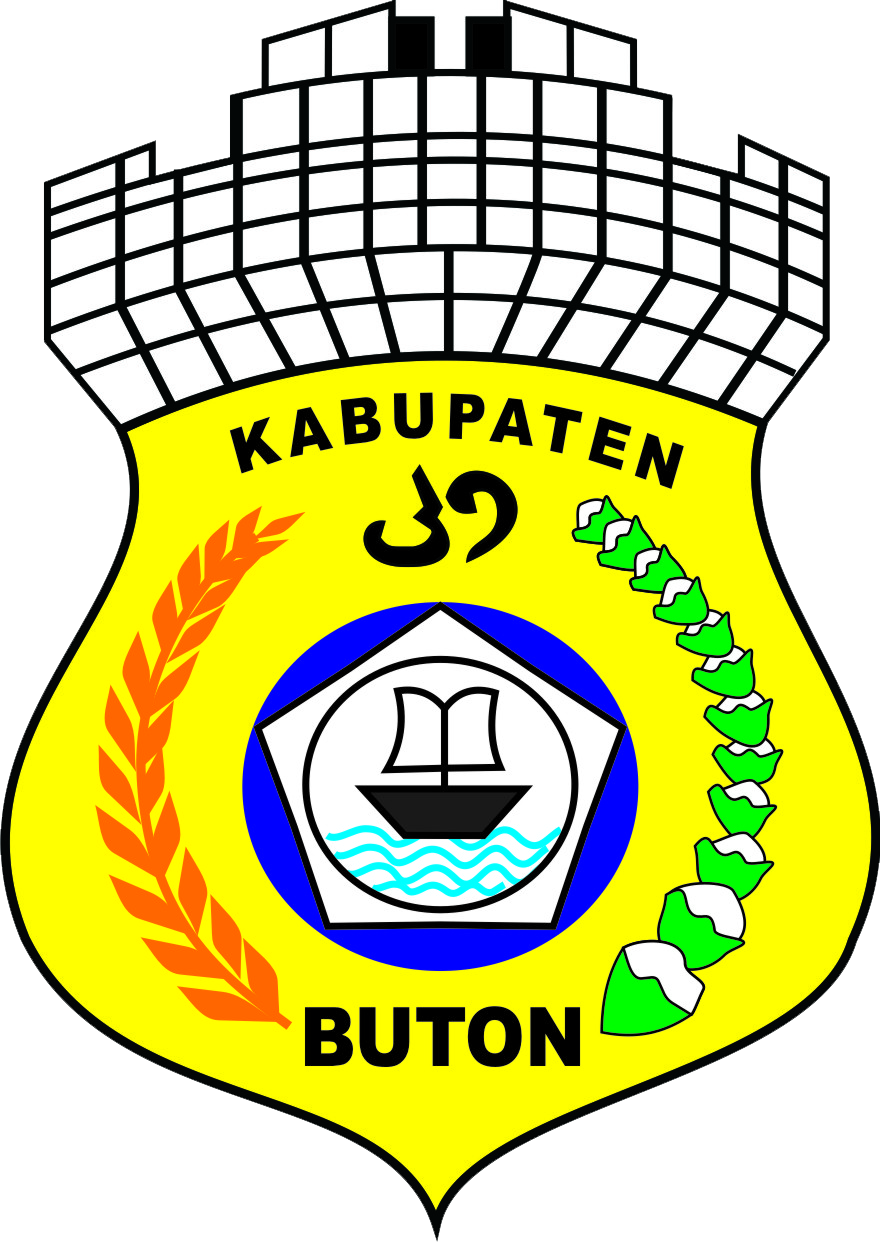
Buton Regency

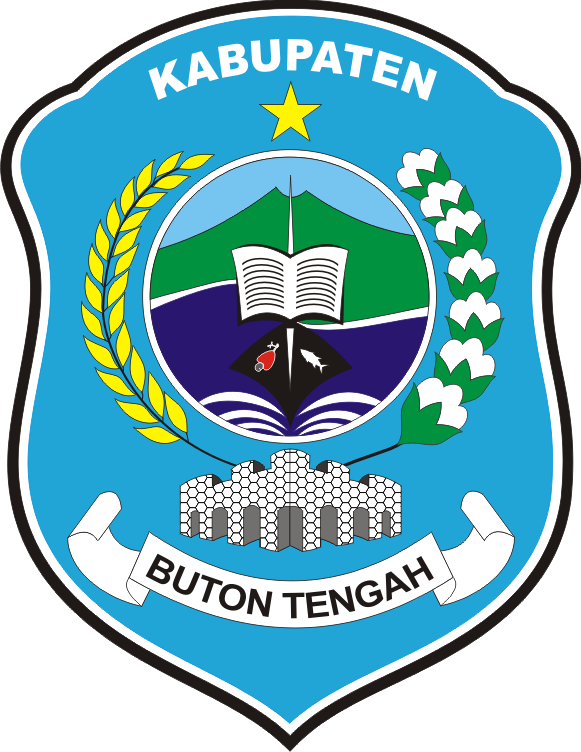
Central Buton Regency

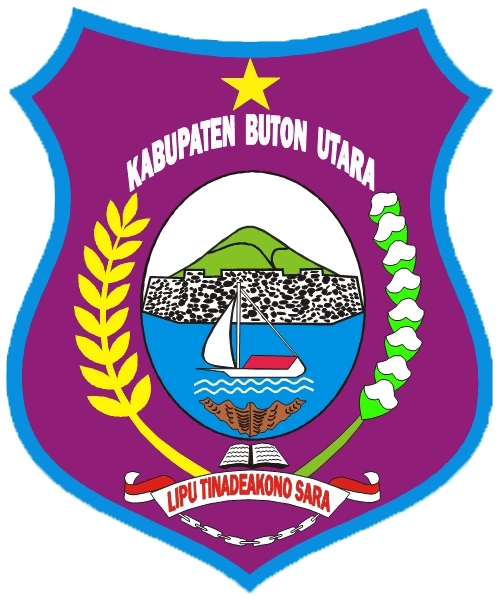
North Buton Regency

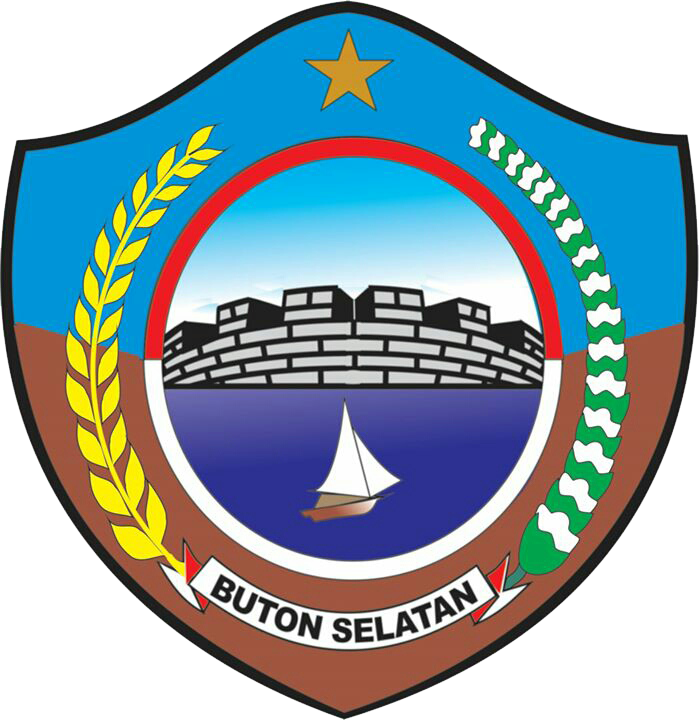
South Buton Regency

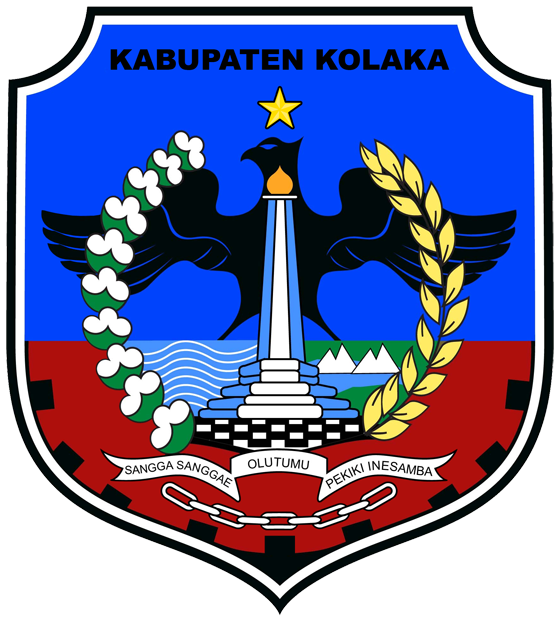
Kolaka Regency

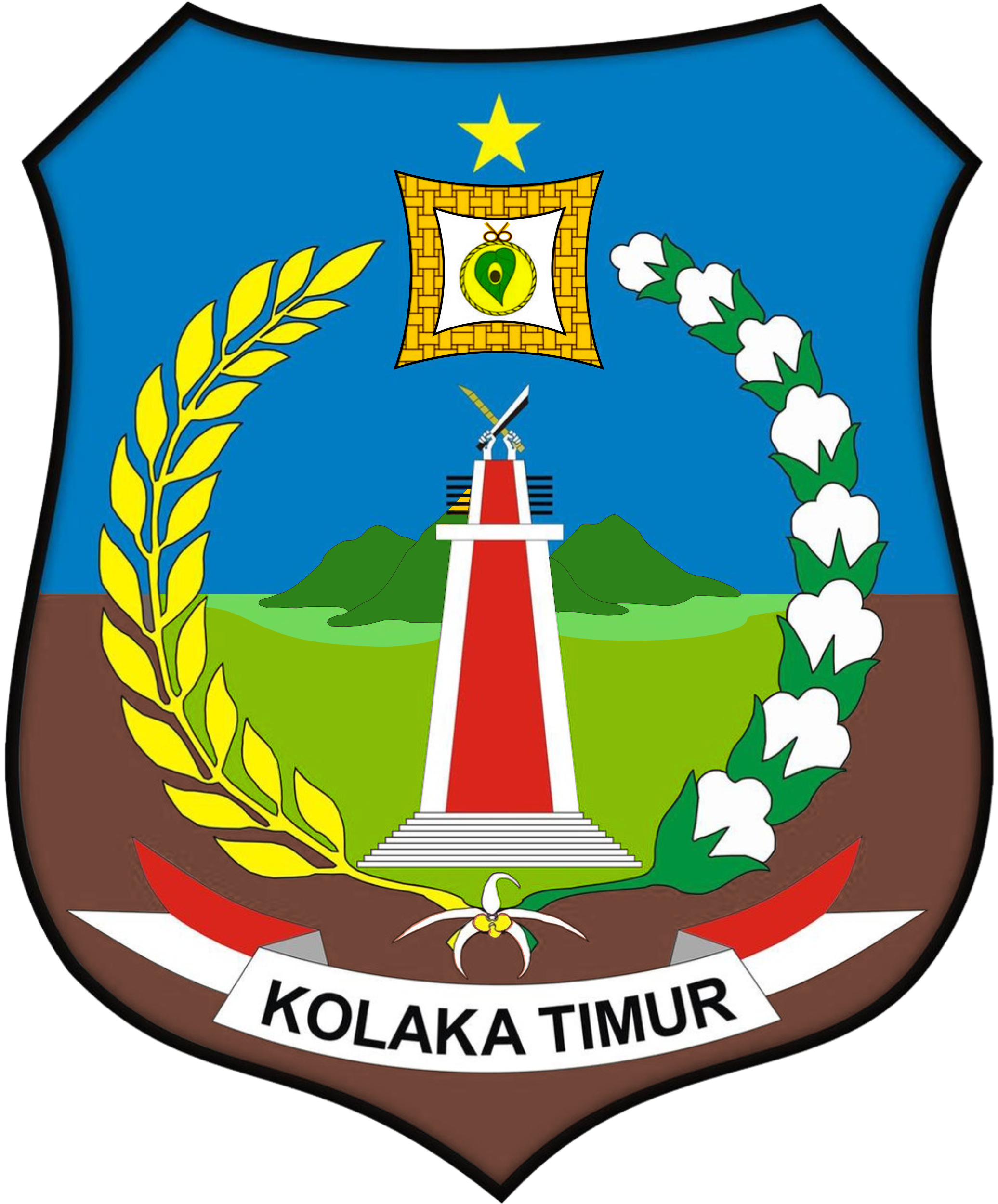
East Kolaka Regency

North Kolaka Regency

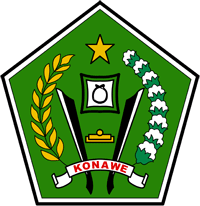
Konawe Regency

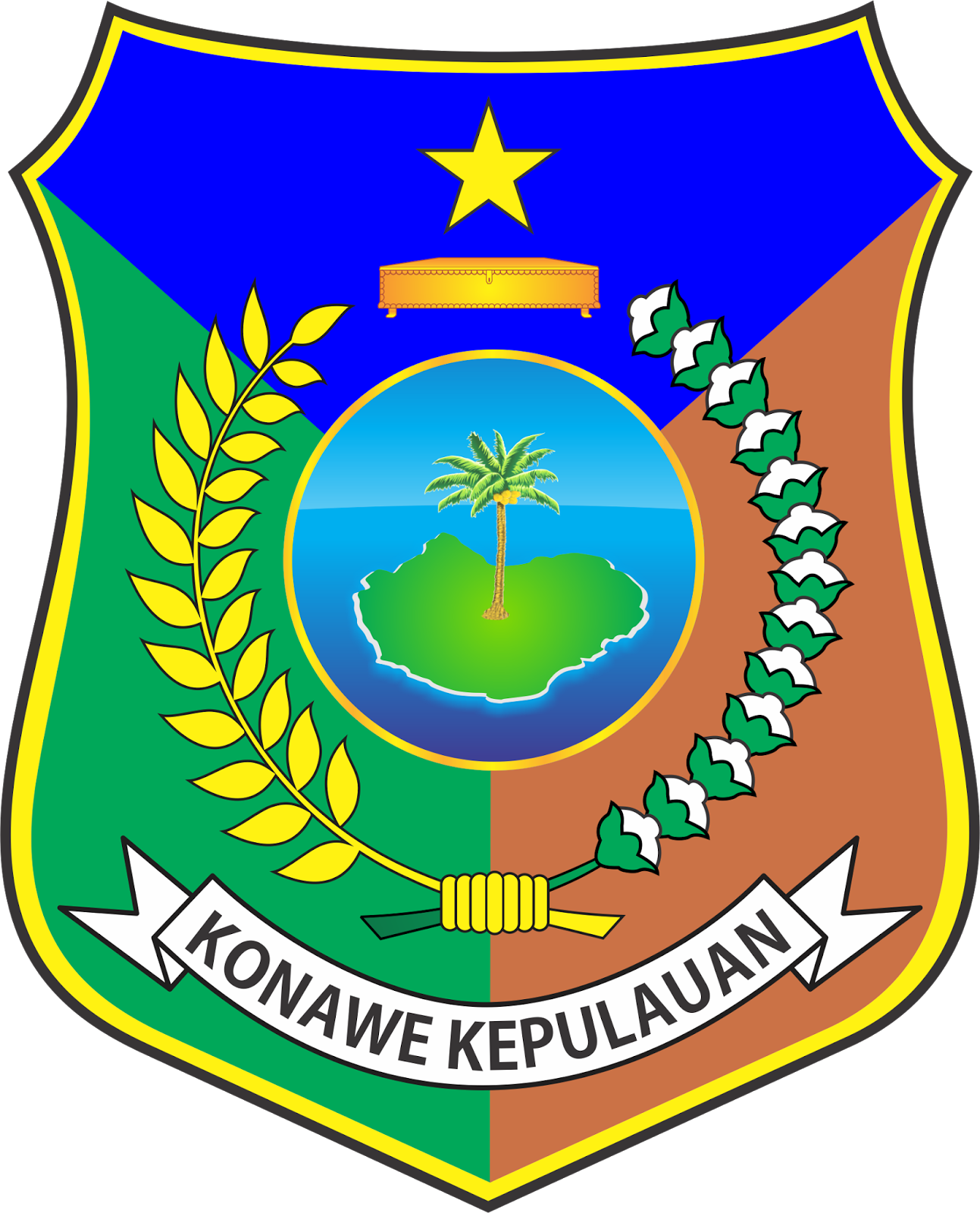
Konawe Islands Regency

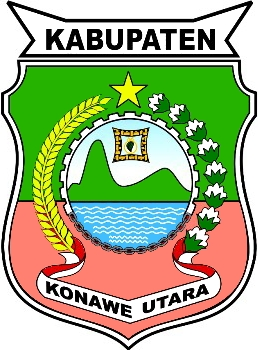
North Konawe Regency

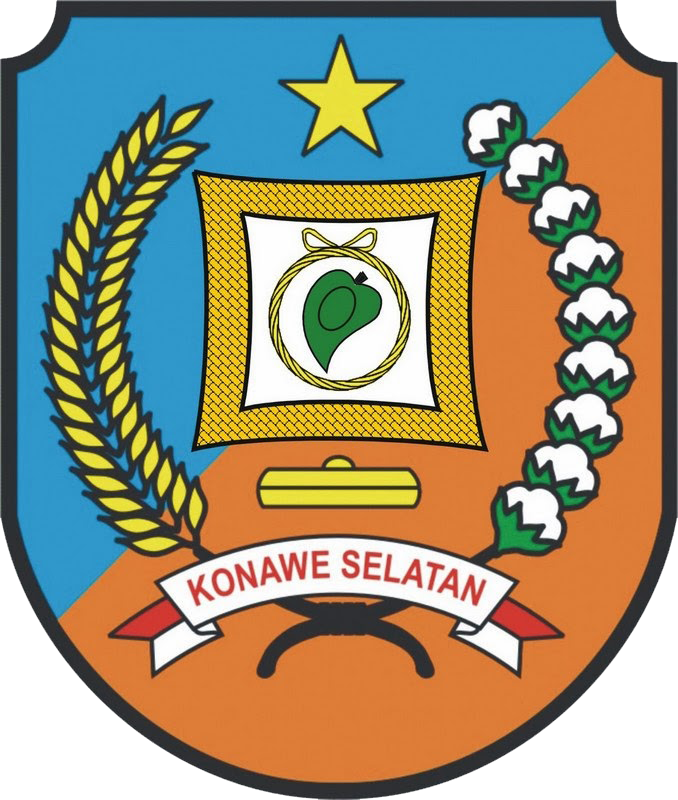
South Konawe Regency

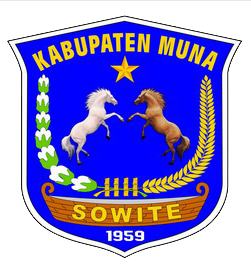
Muna Regency

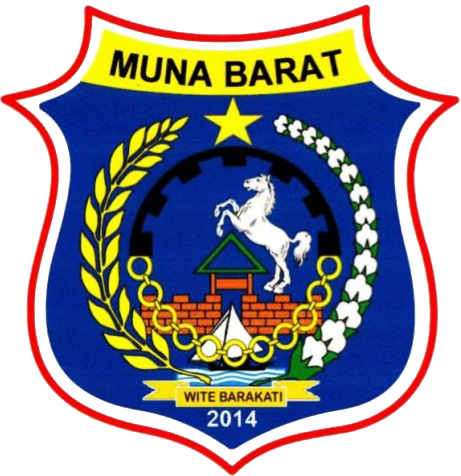
West Muna Regency

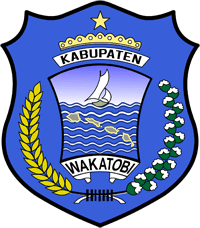
Wakatobi Regency

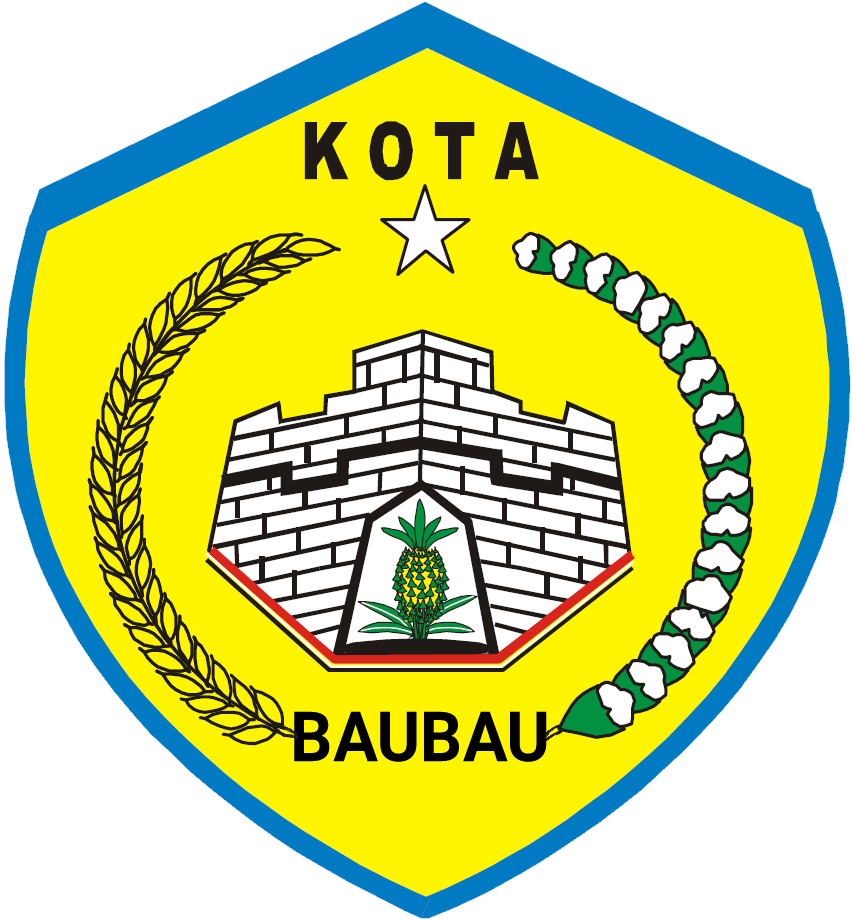
Baubau City

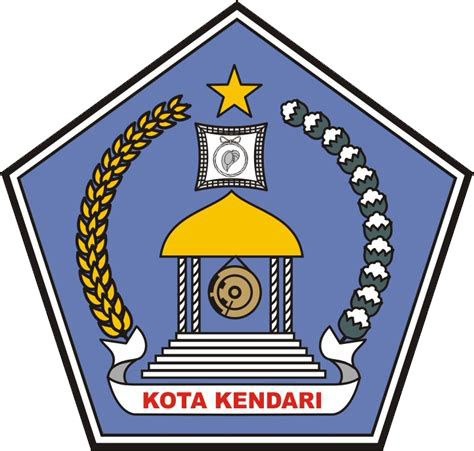
Kendari City

=== Central Sulawesi ===
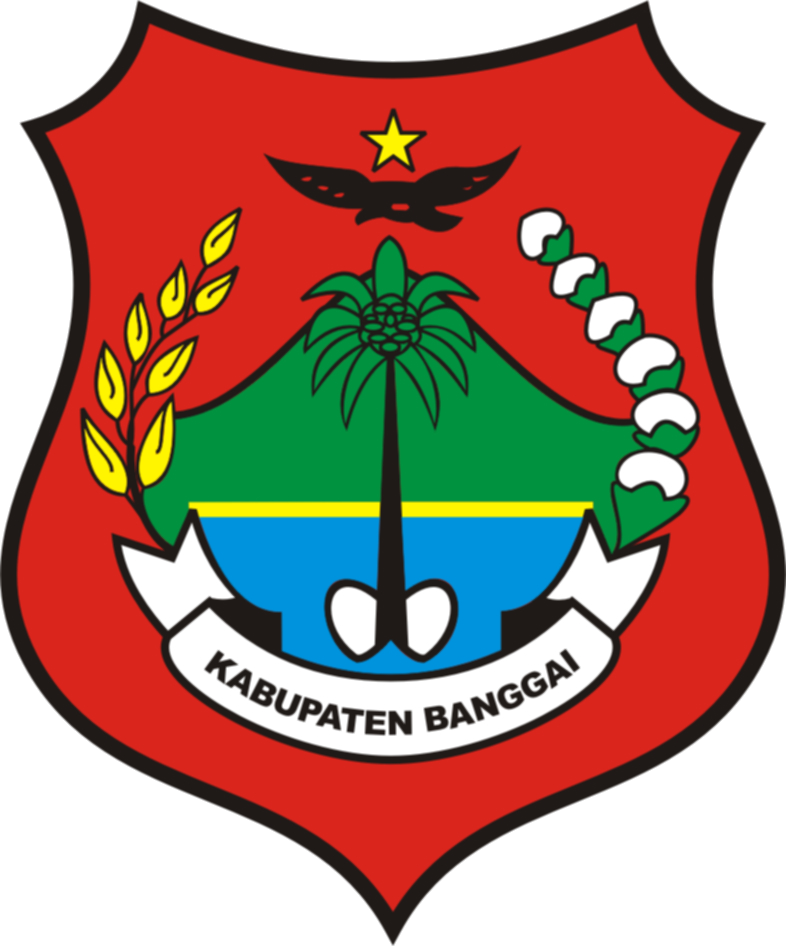
Banggai Regency

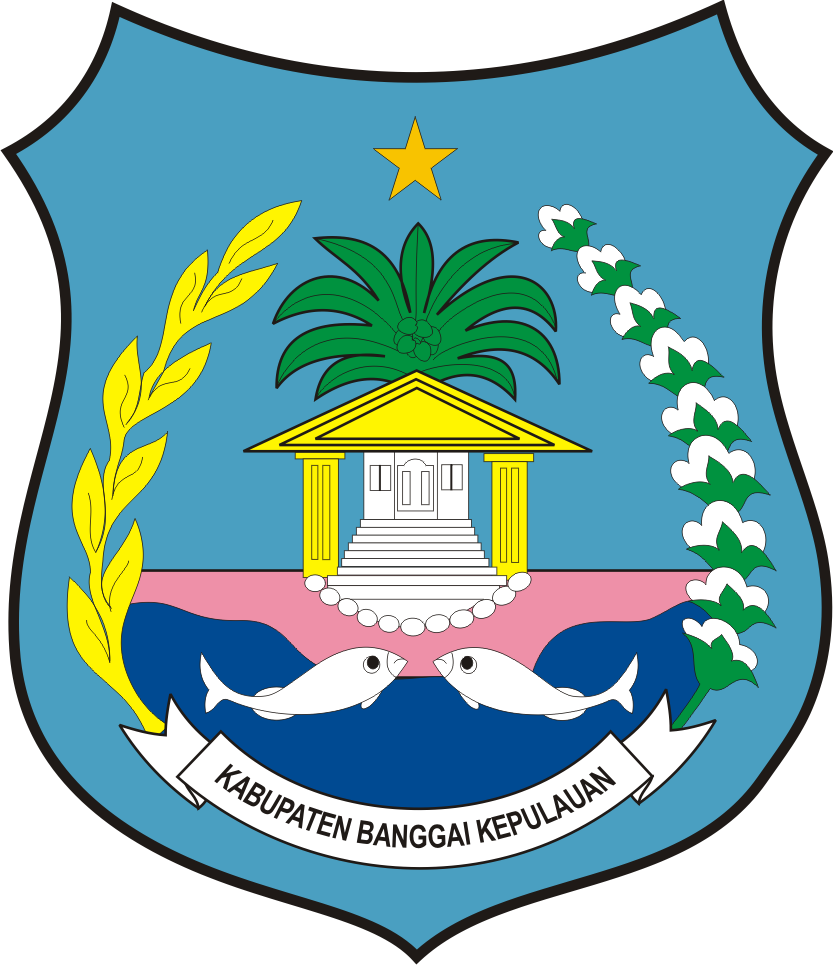
Banggai Islands Regency

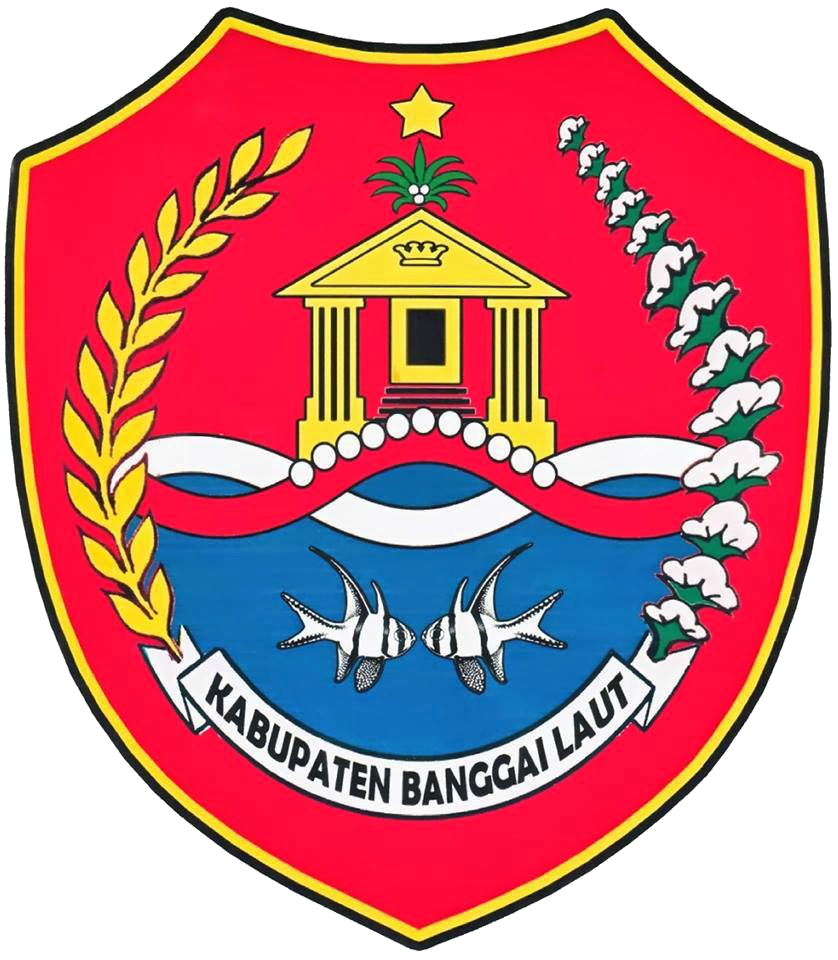
Banggai Laut Regency

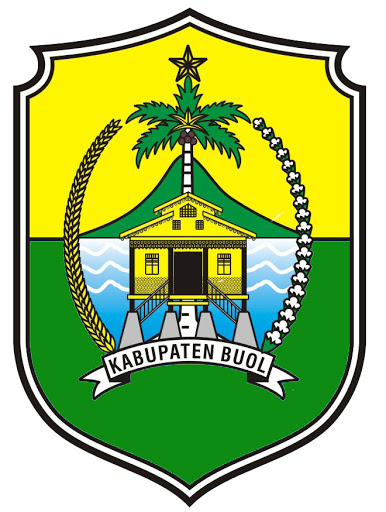
Buol Regency

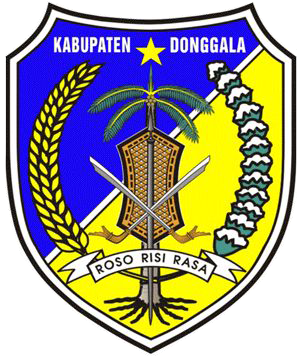
Donggala Regency

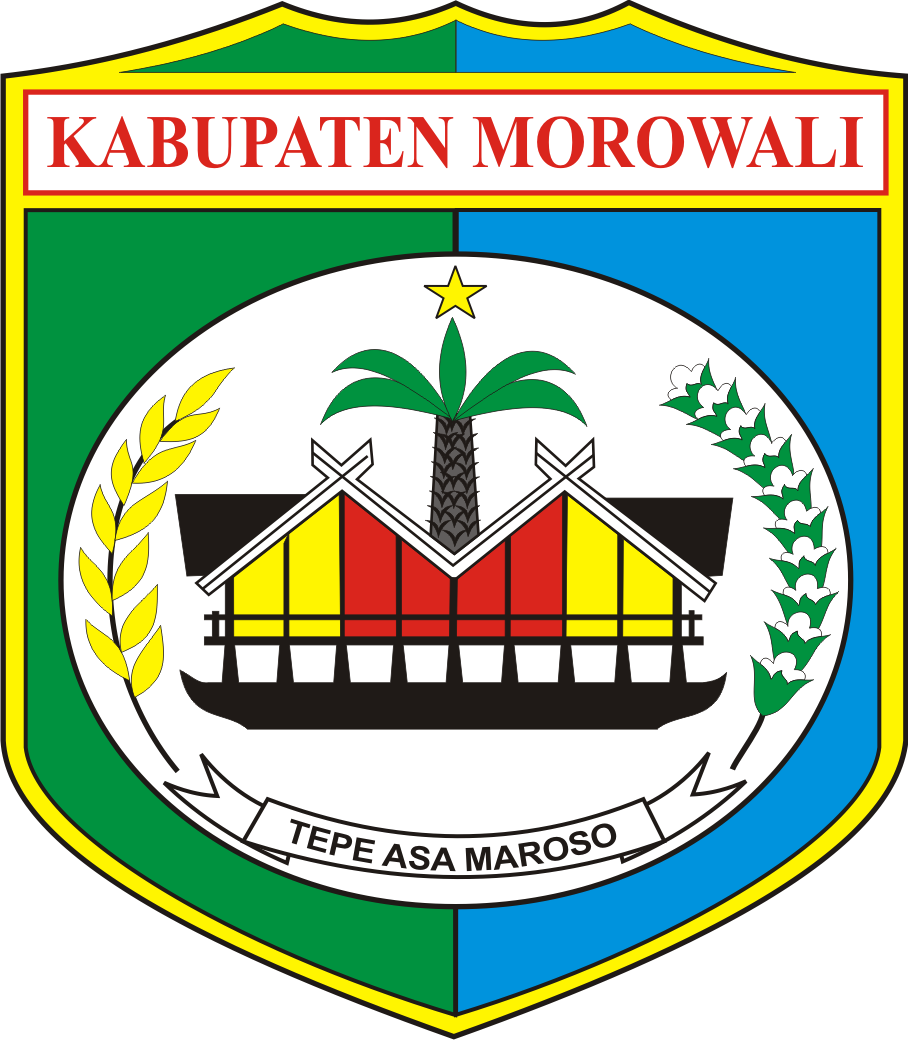
Morowali Regency

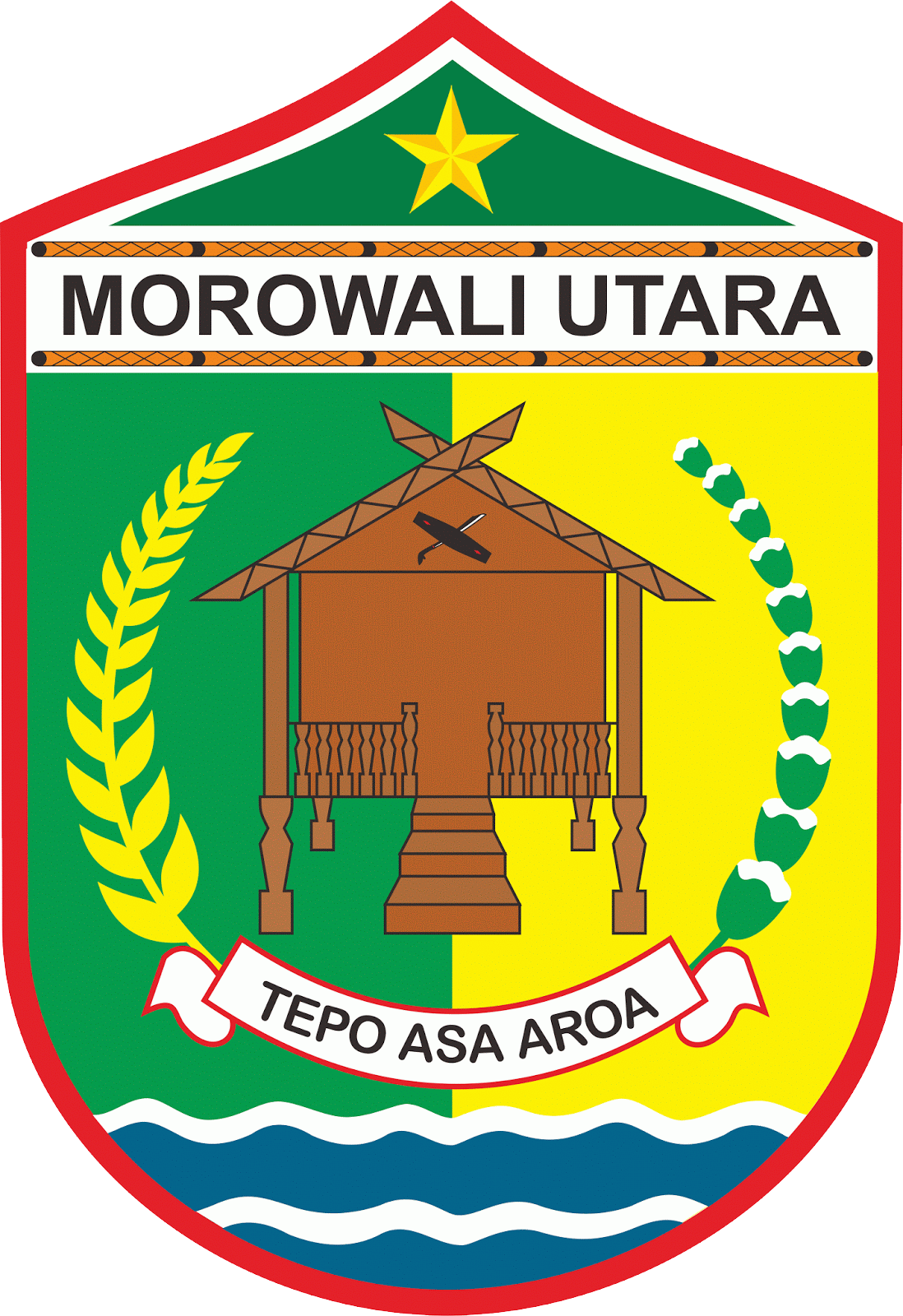
North Morowali Regency

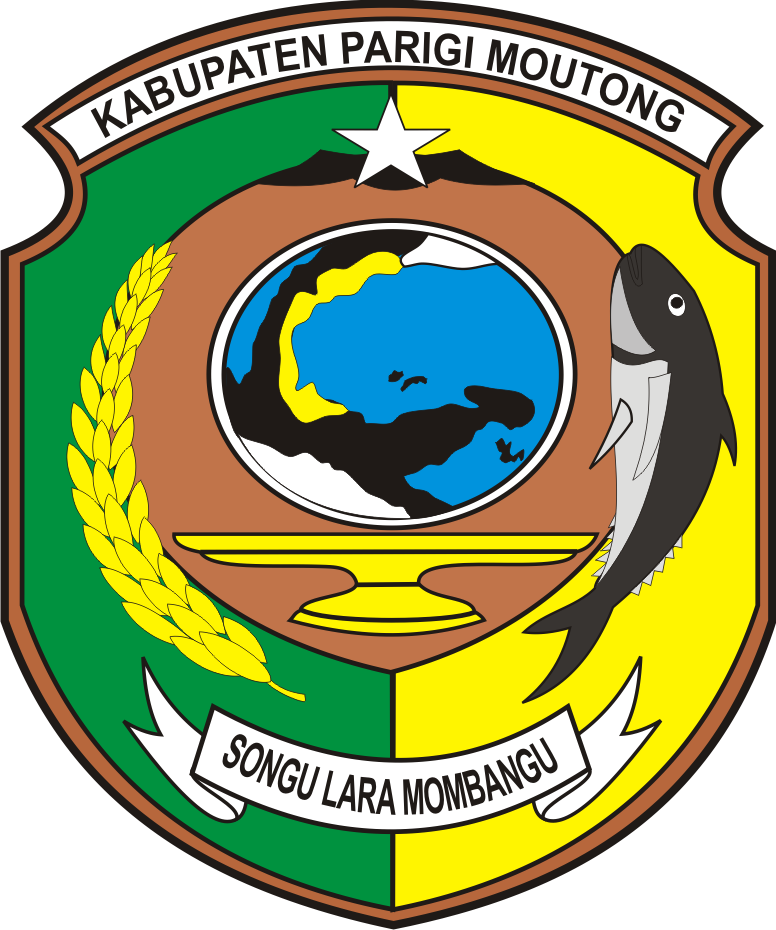
Parigi Moutong Regency

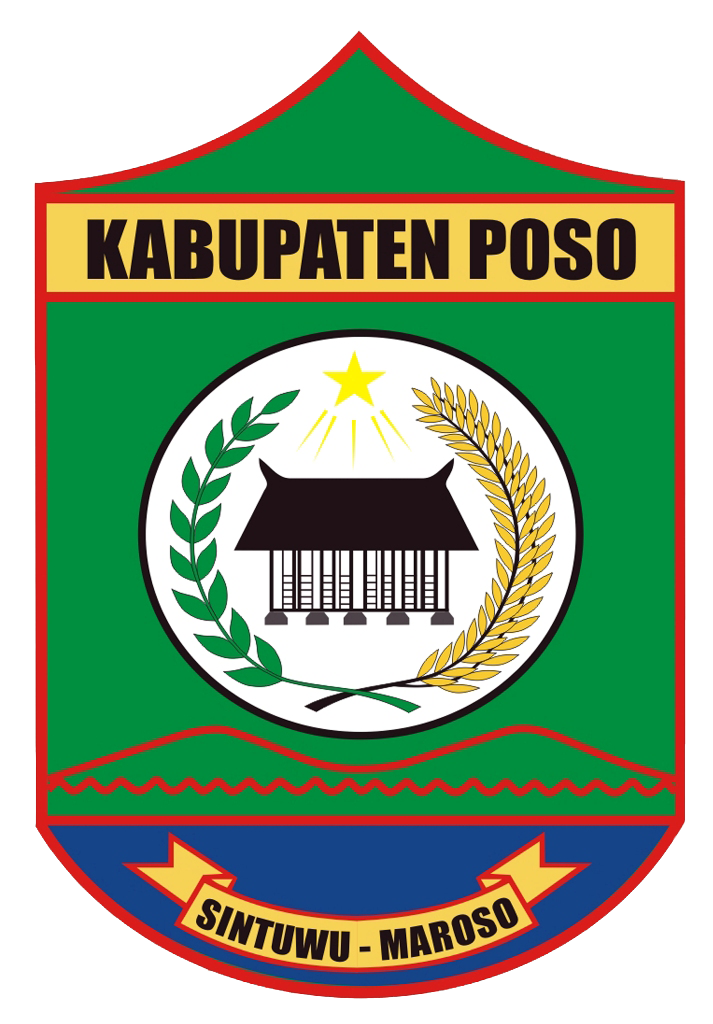
Poso Regency

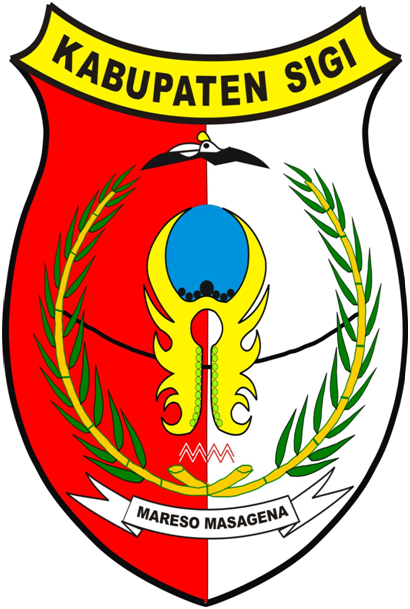
Sigi Regency

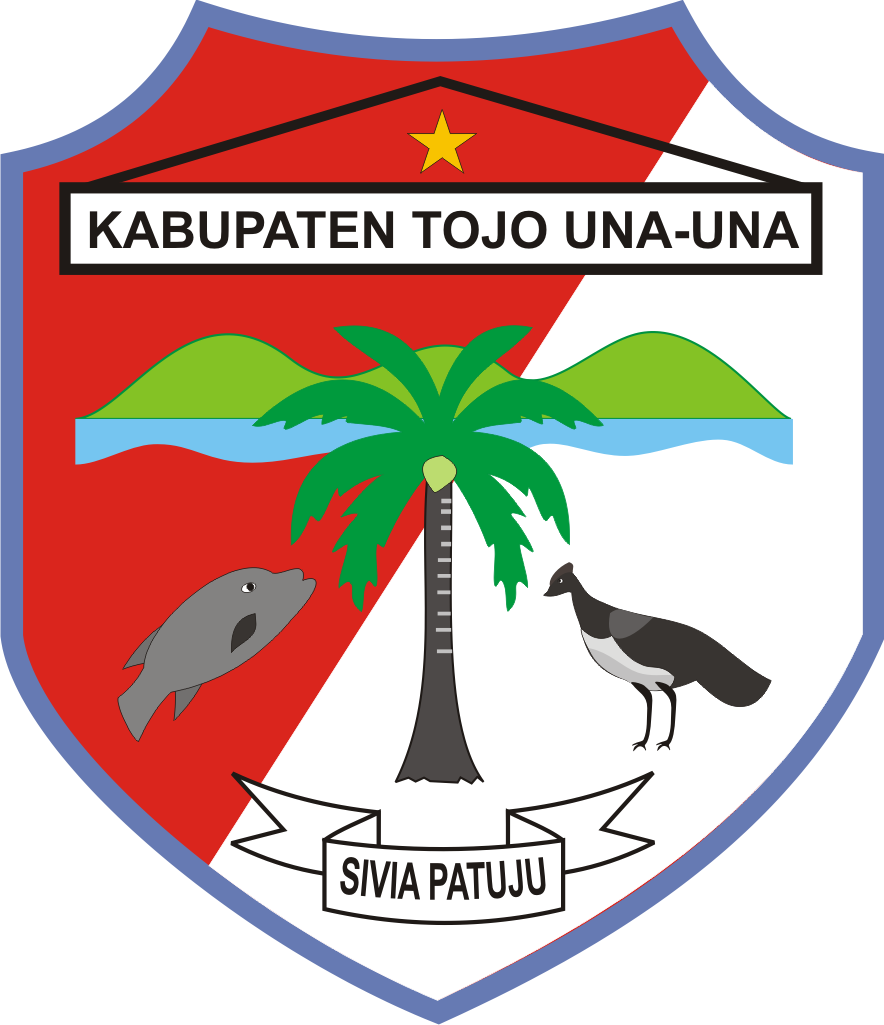
Tojo Una-Una Regency

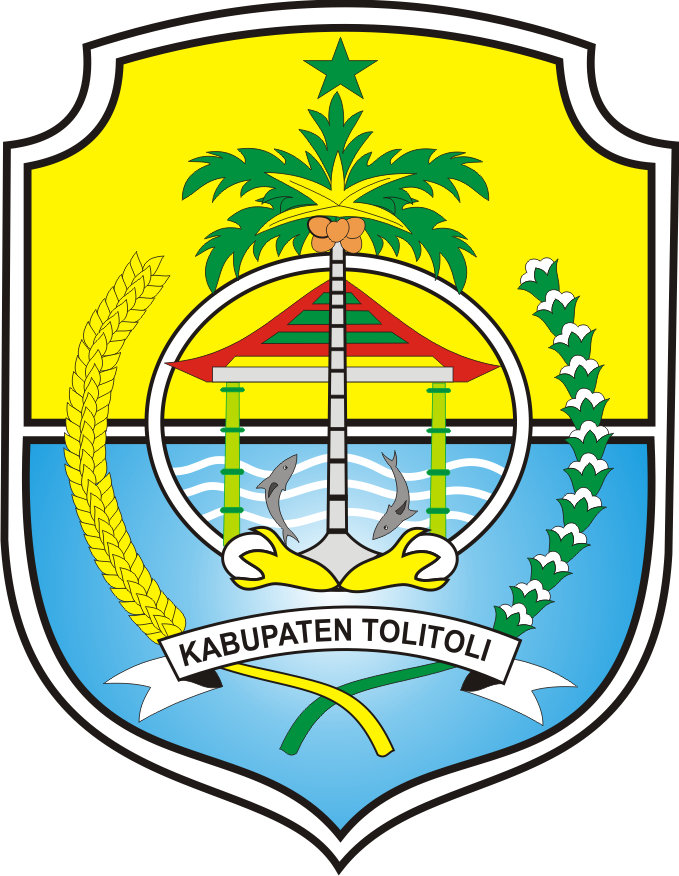
Tolitoli Regency

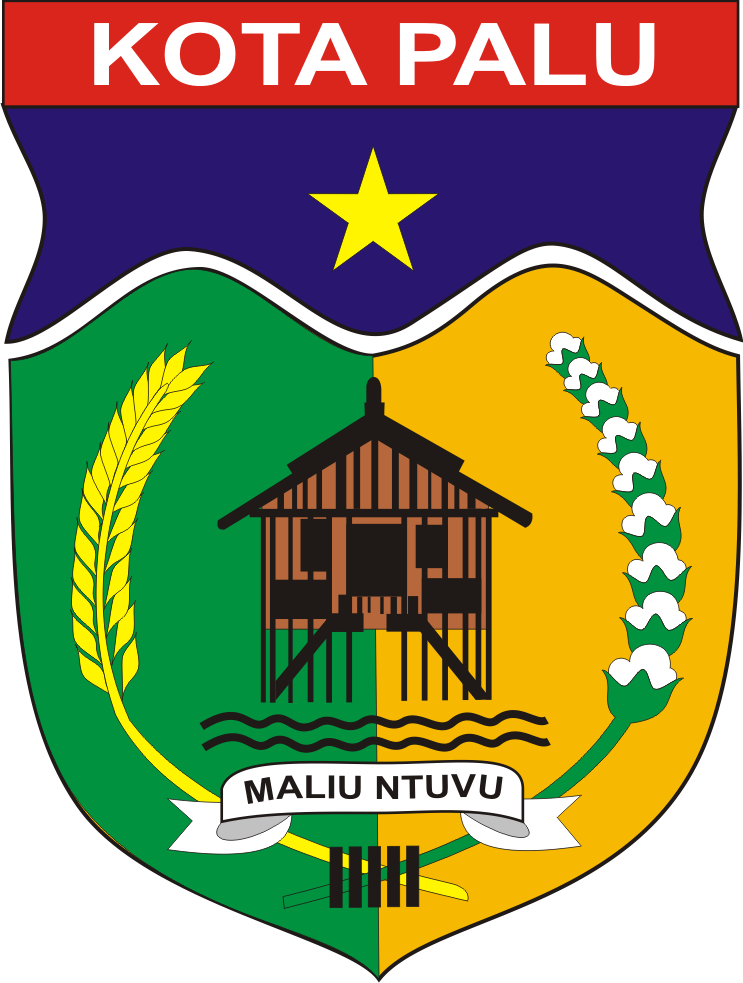
Palu City

=== Gorontalo ===
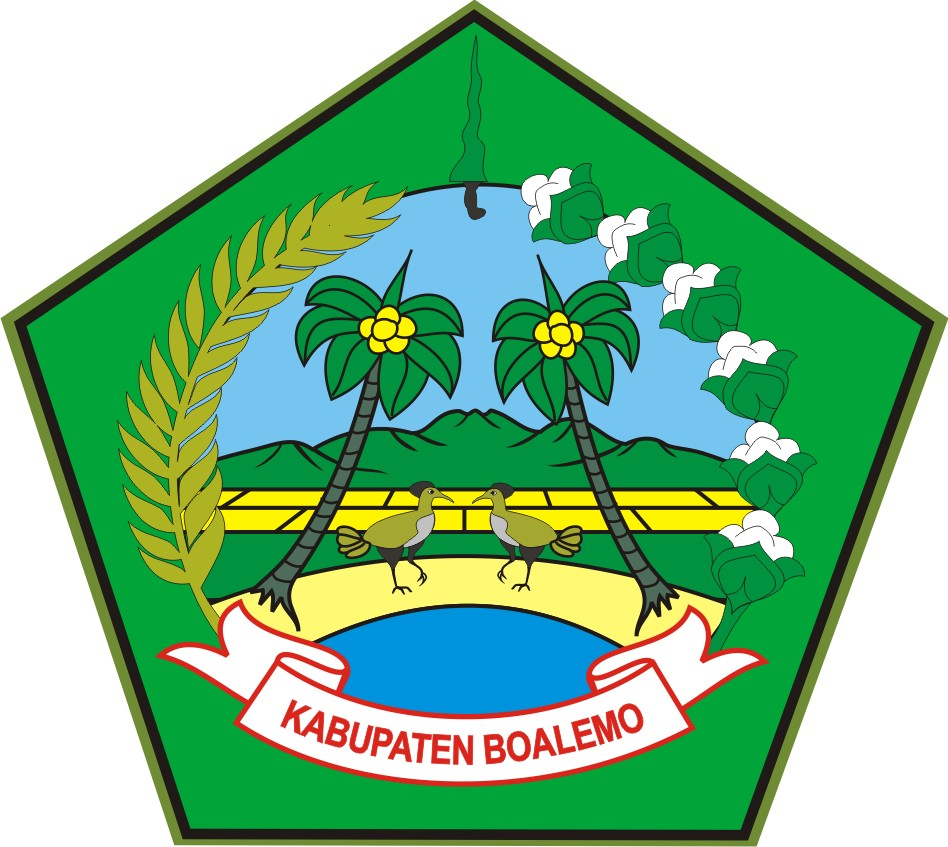
Boalemo Regency

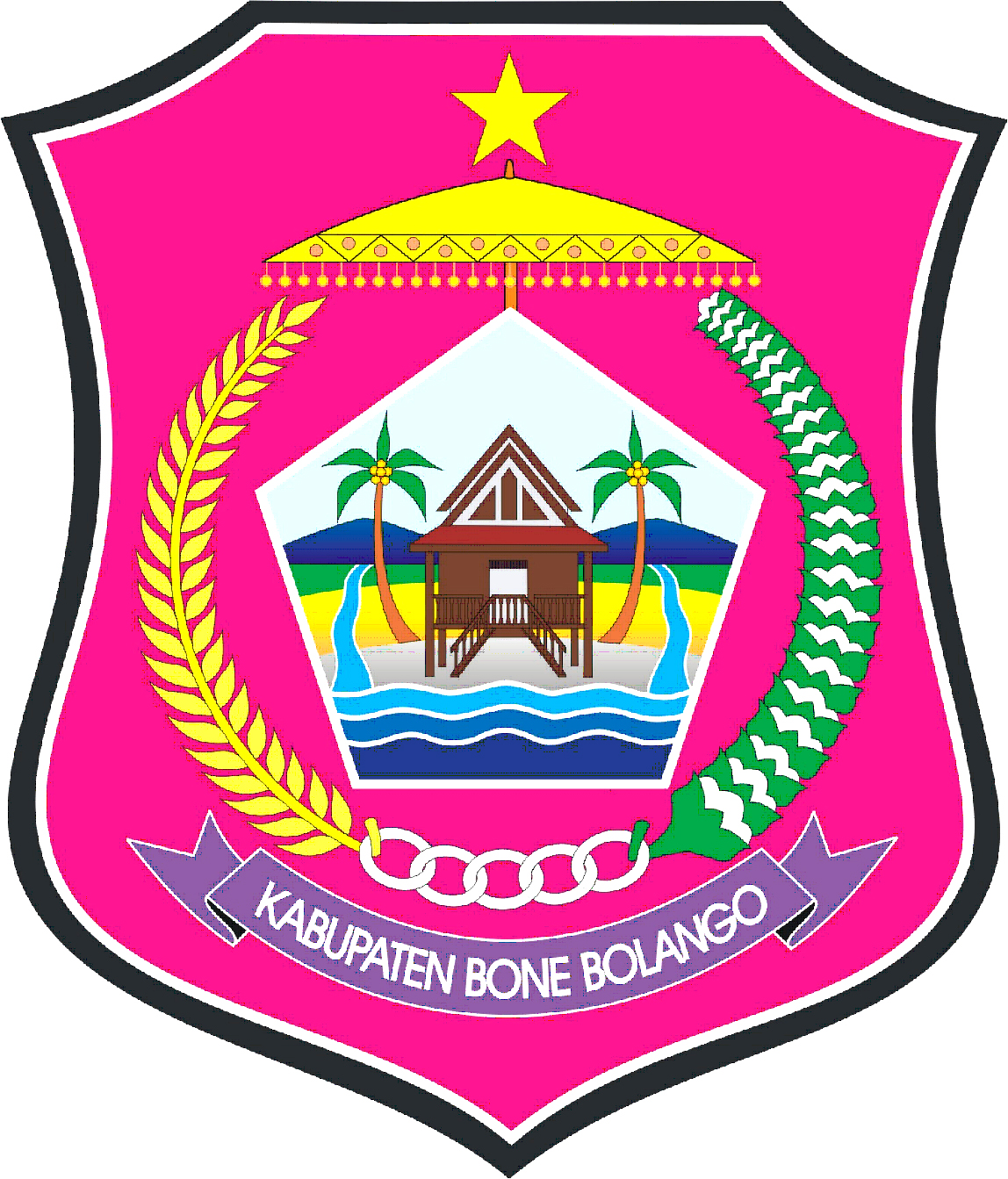
Bone Bolango Regency

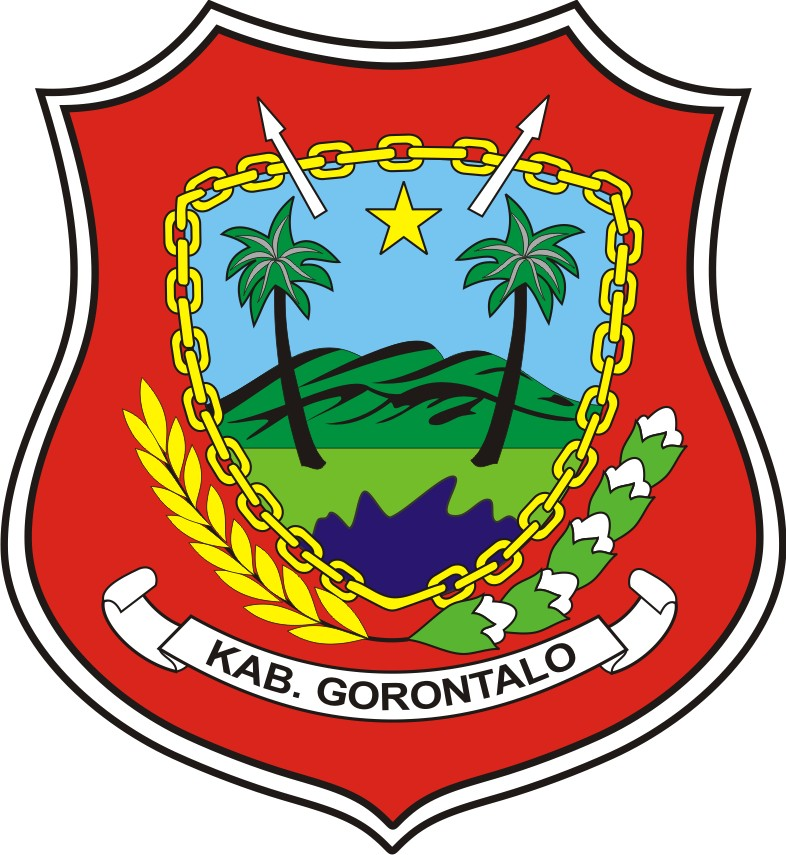
Gorontalo Regency

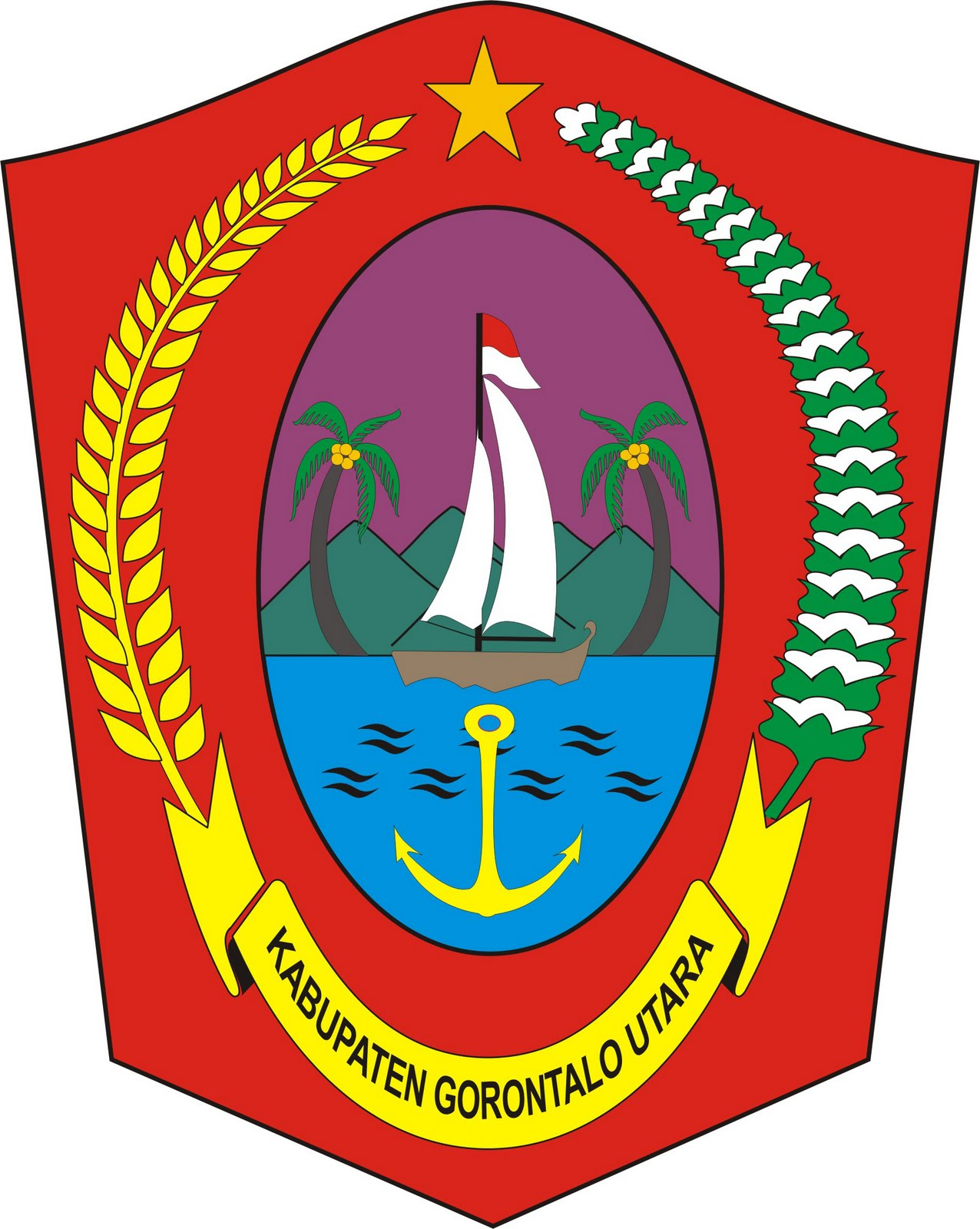
North Gorontalo Regency

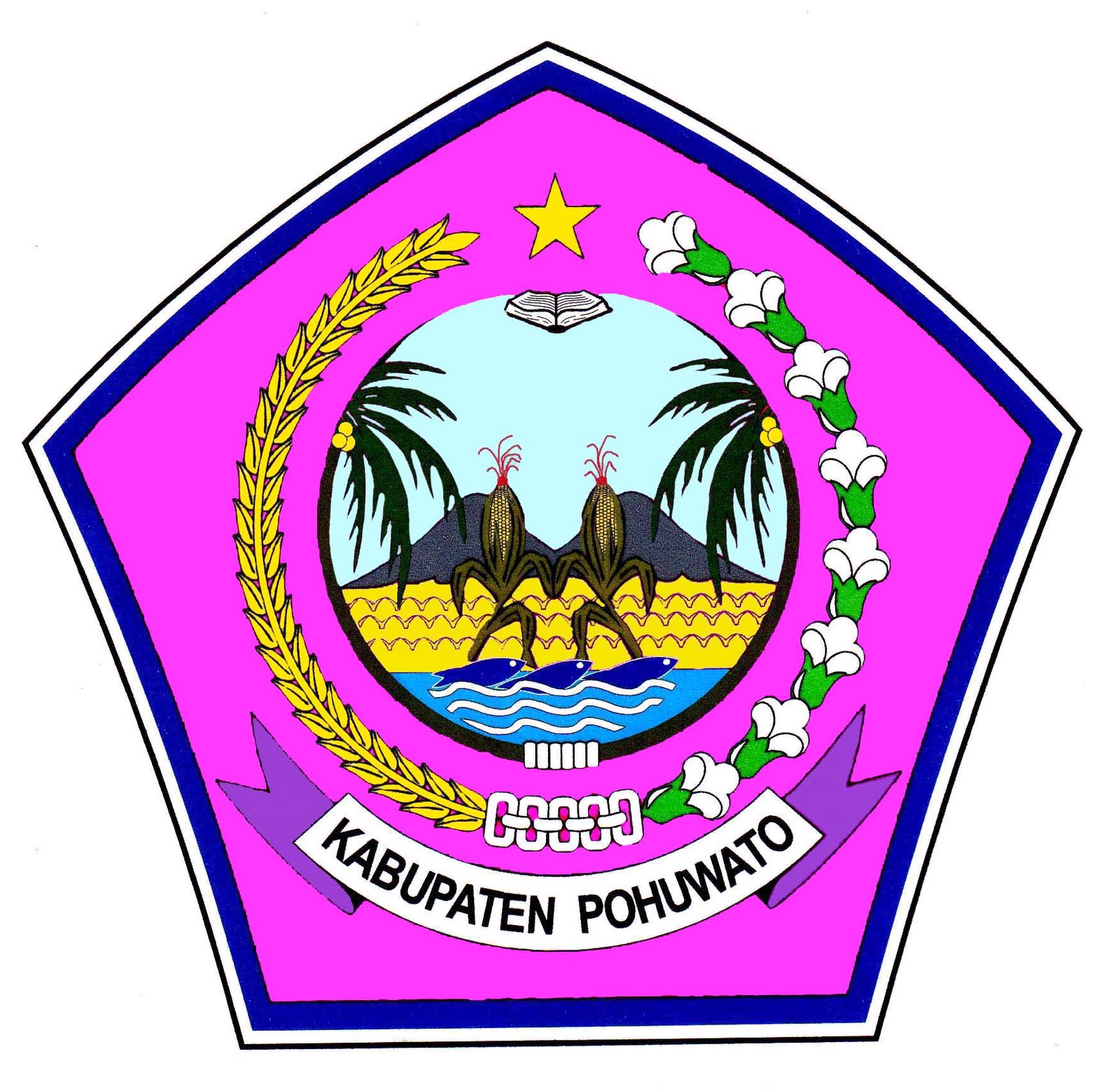
Pohuwato Regency

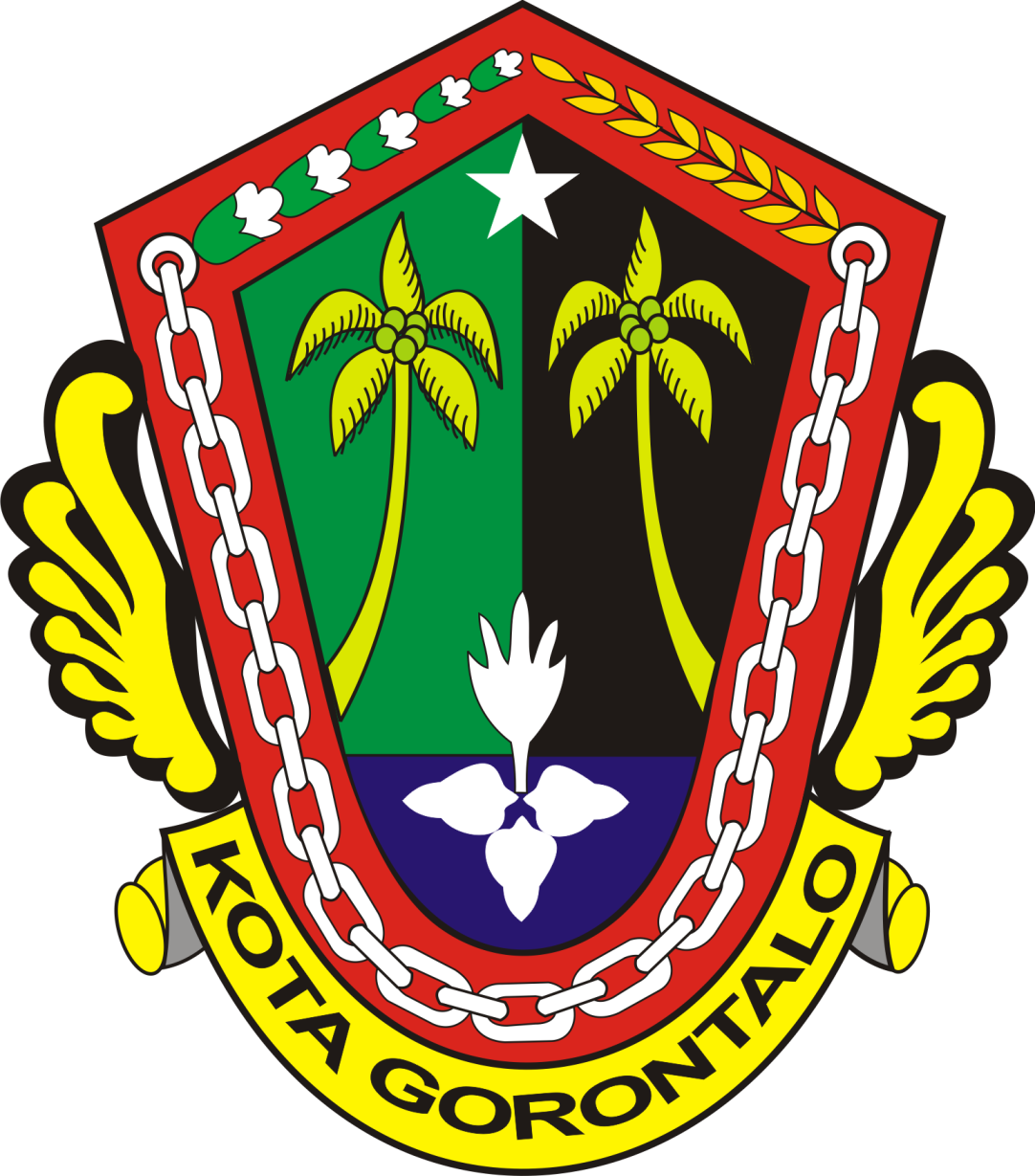
Gorontalo City

=== North Sulawesi ===
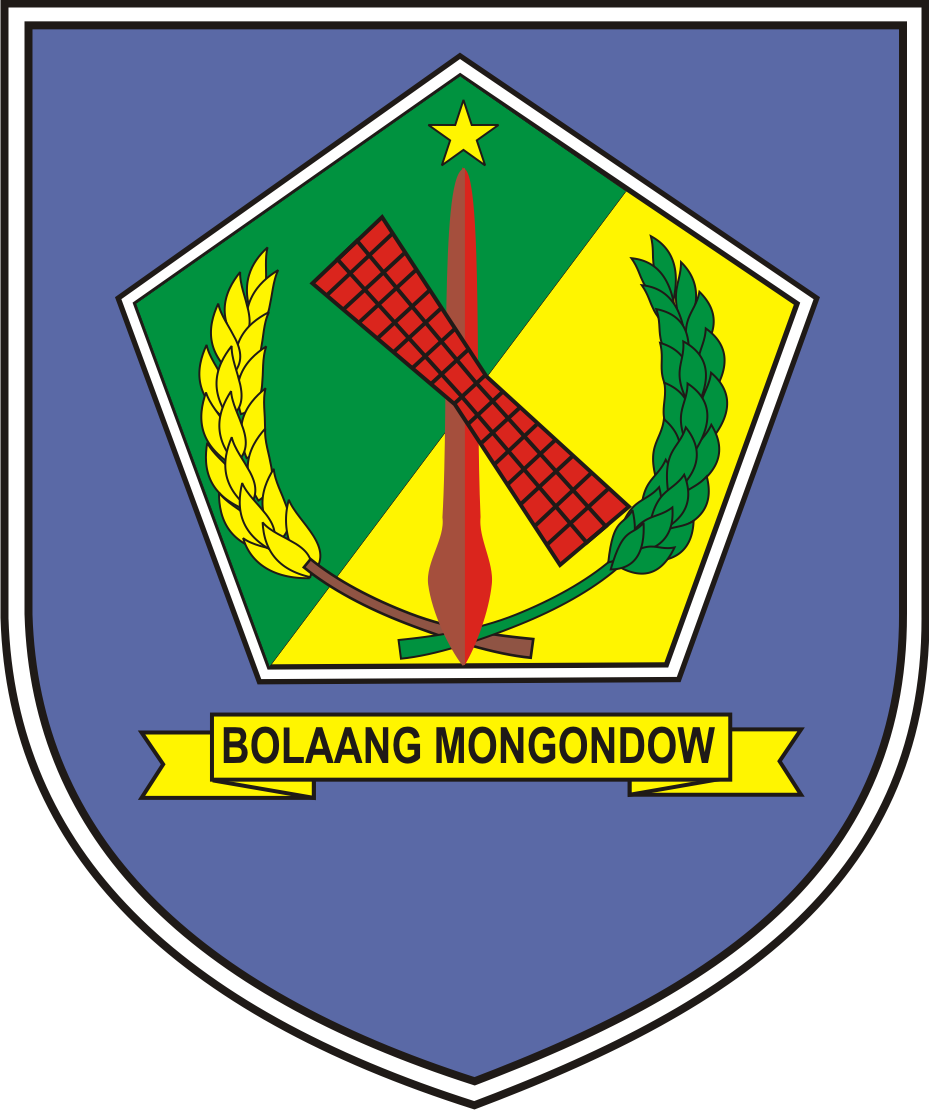
Bolaang Mongondow (Bolmong) Regency

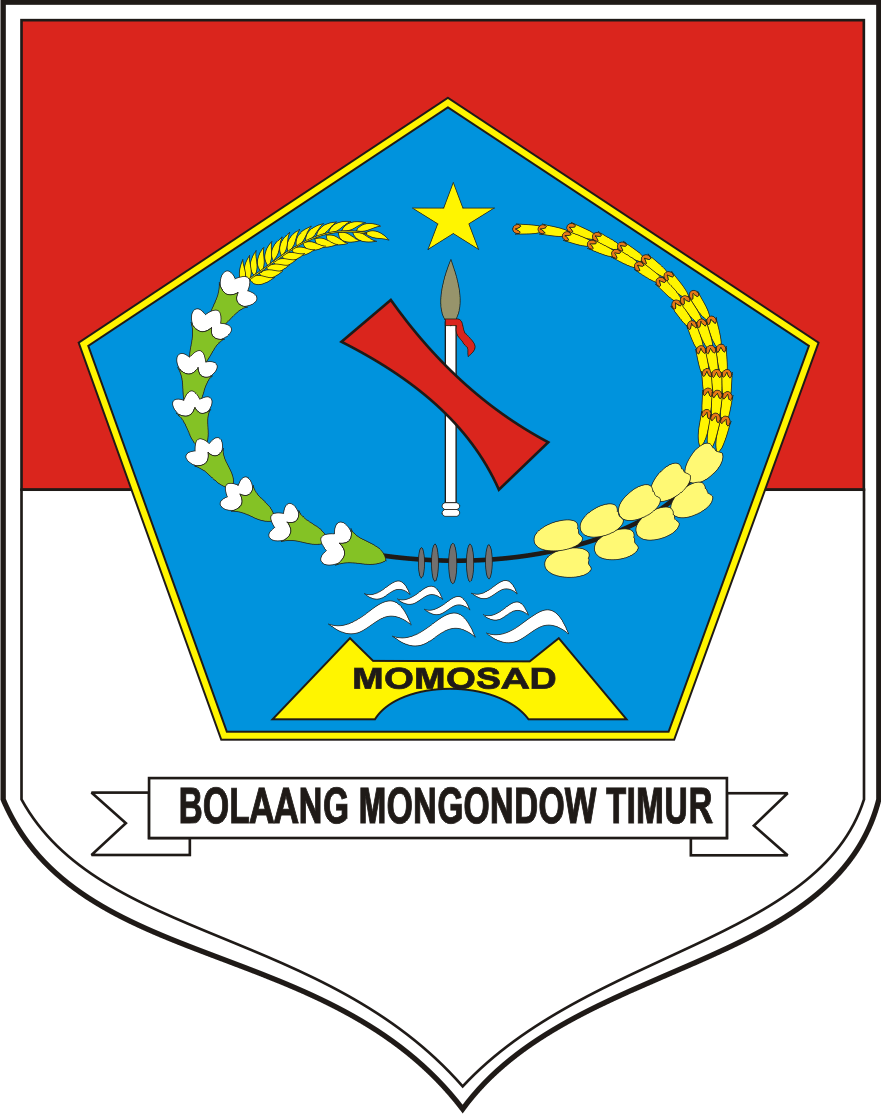
East Bolaang Mongondow Regency

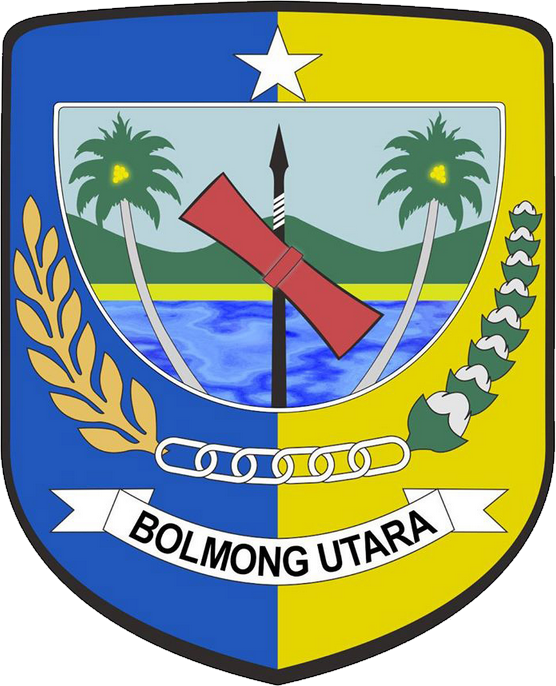
North Bolaang Mongondow Regency

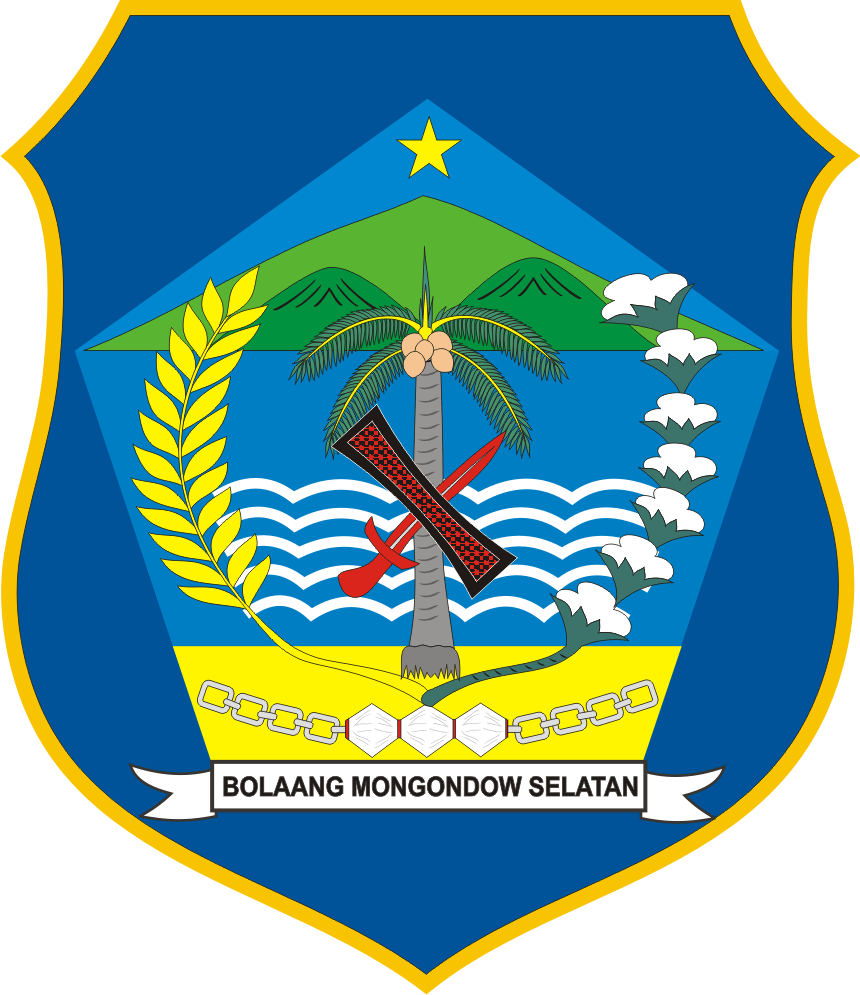
South Bolaang Mongondow Regency

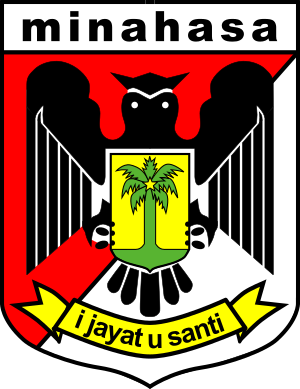
Minahasa Regency

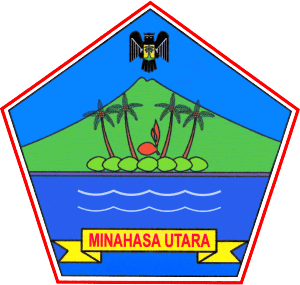
North Minahasa Regency

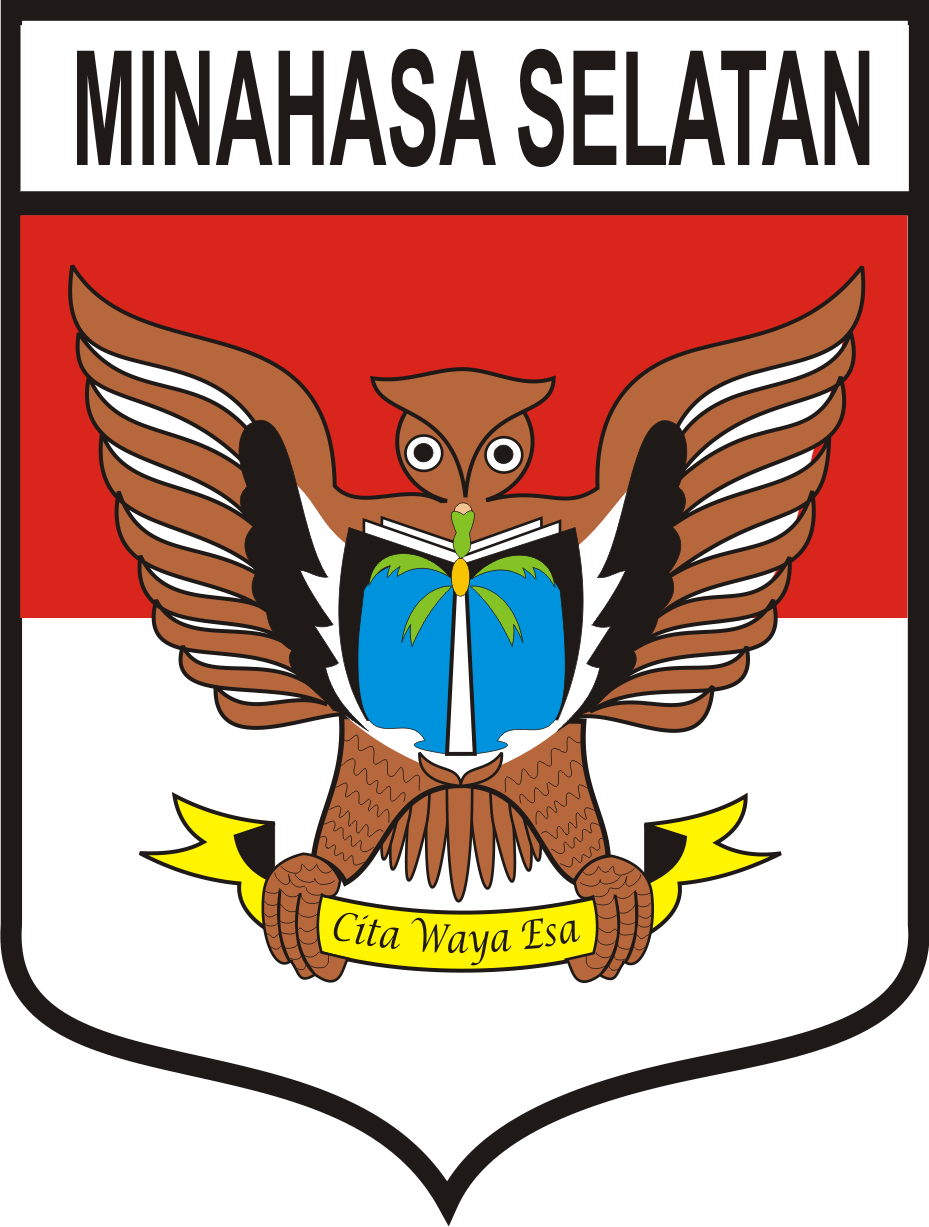
South Minahasa Regency

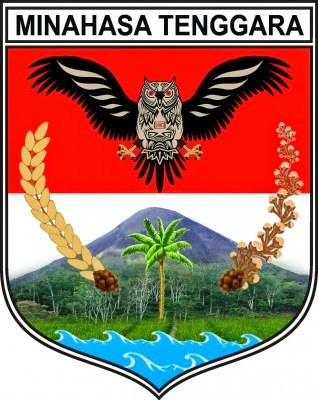
Southeast Minahasa Regency

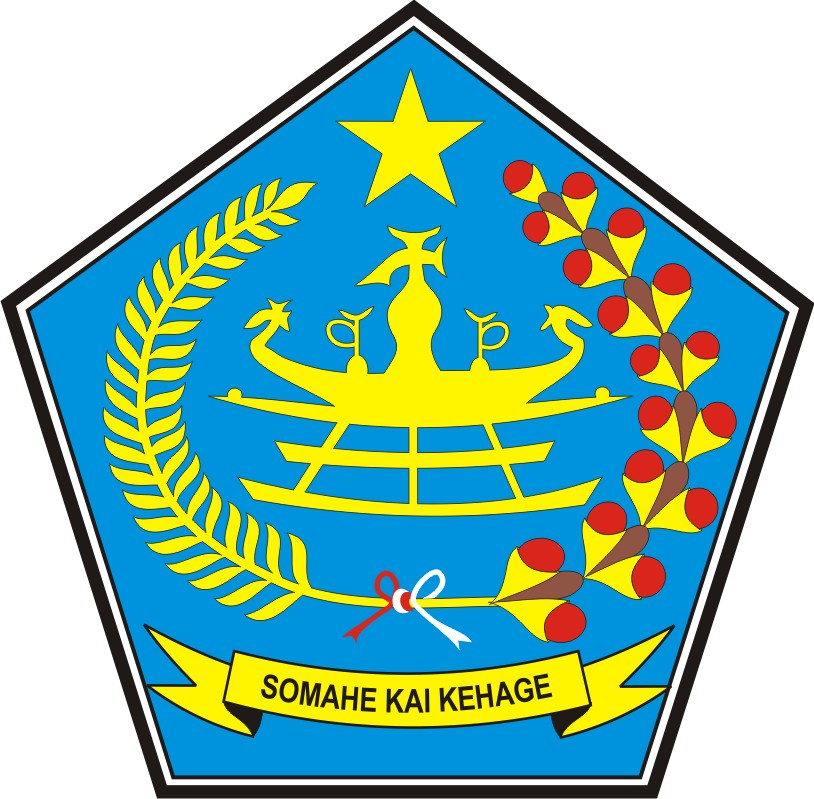
Sangihe Islands Regency

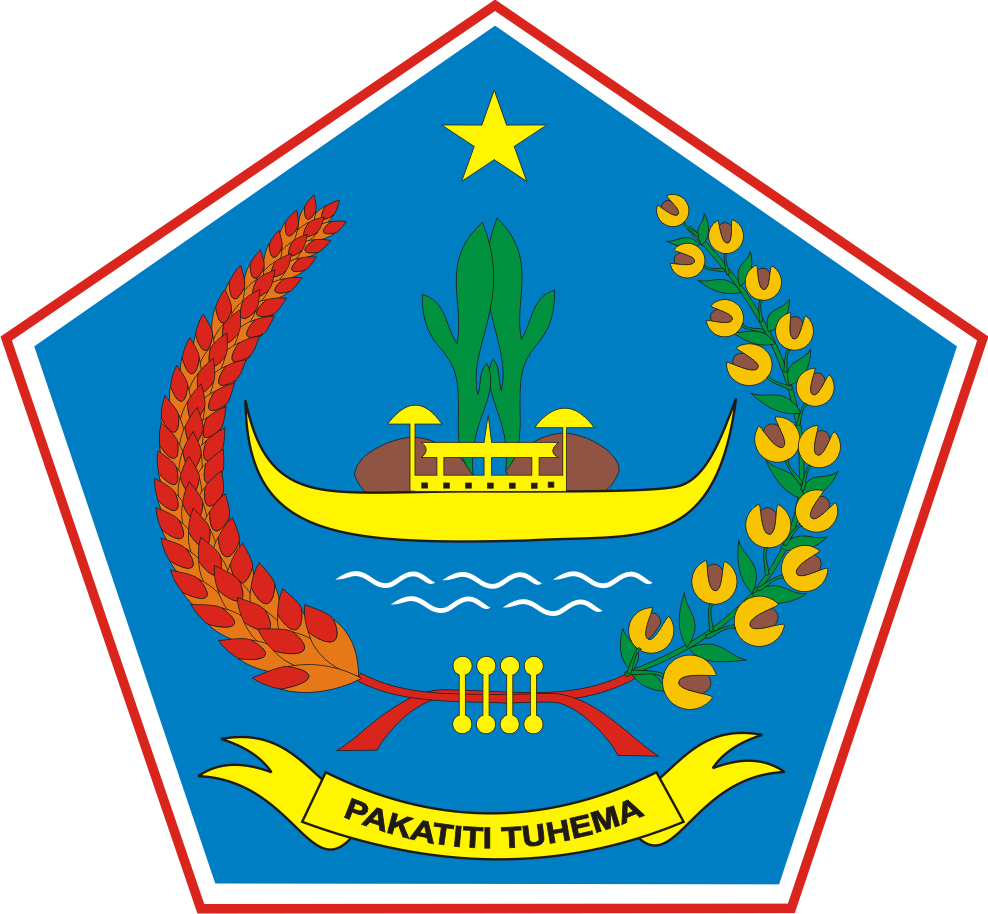
Siau Tagulandang Biaro (Sitaro) Islands Regency

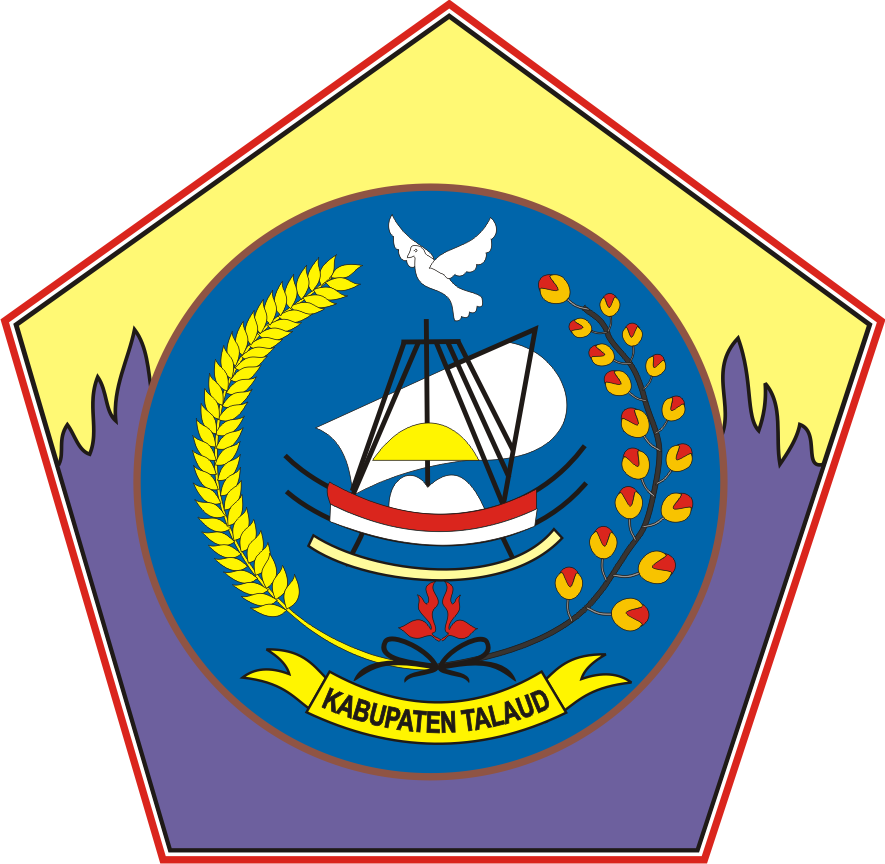
Talaud Islands Regency

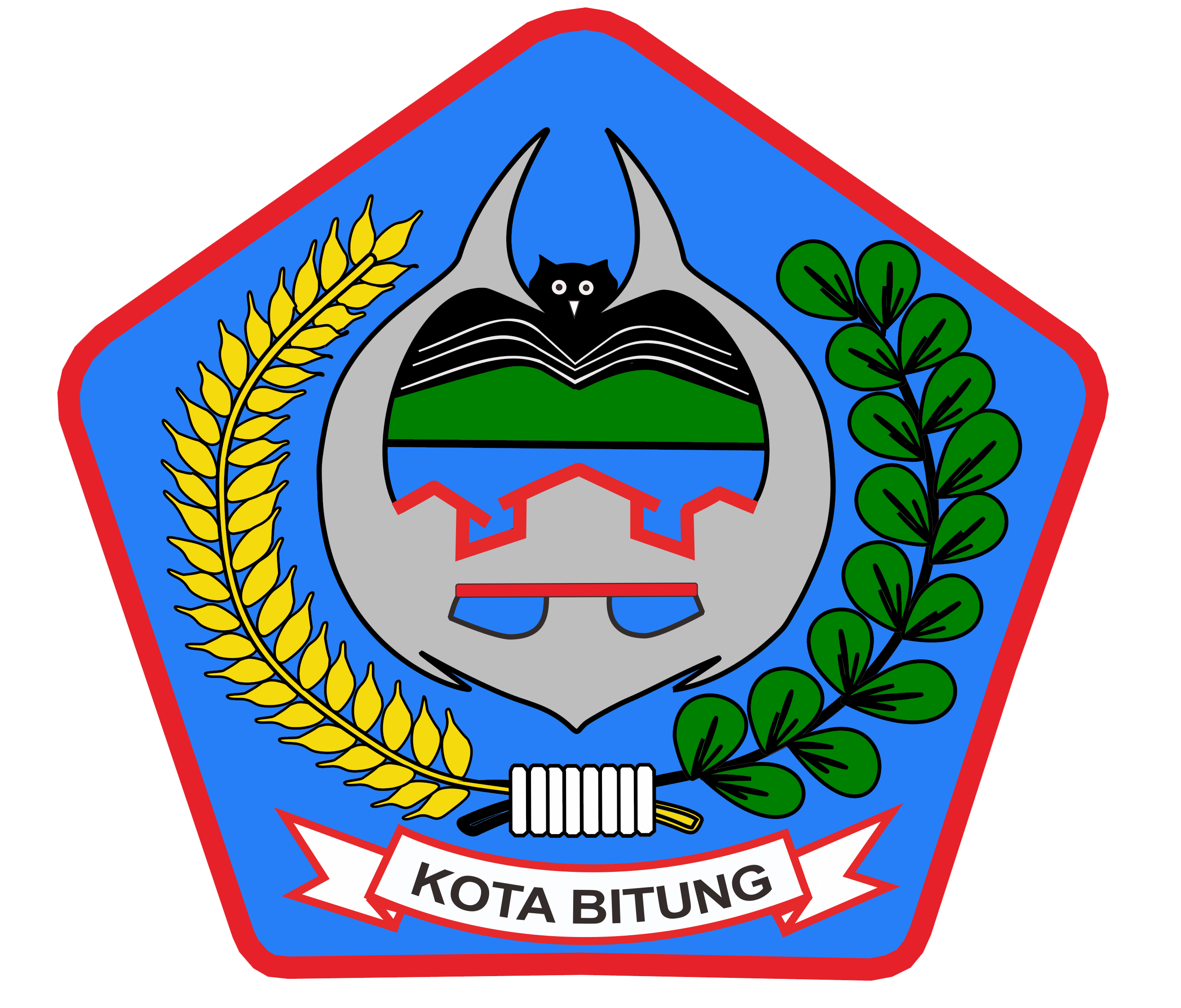
Bitung City

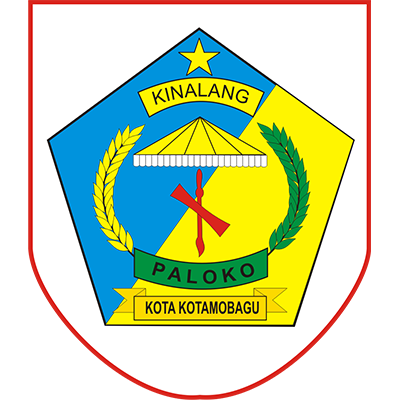
Kotamobagu City

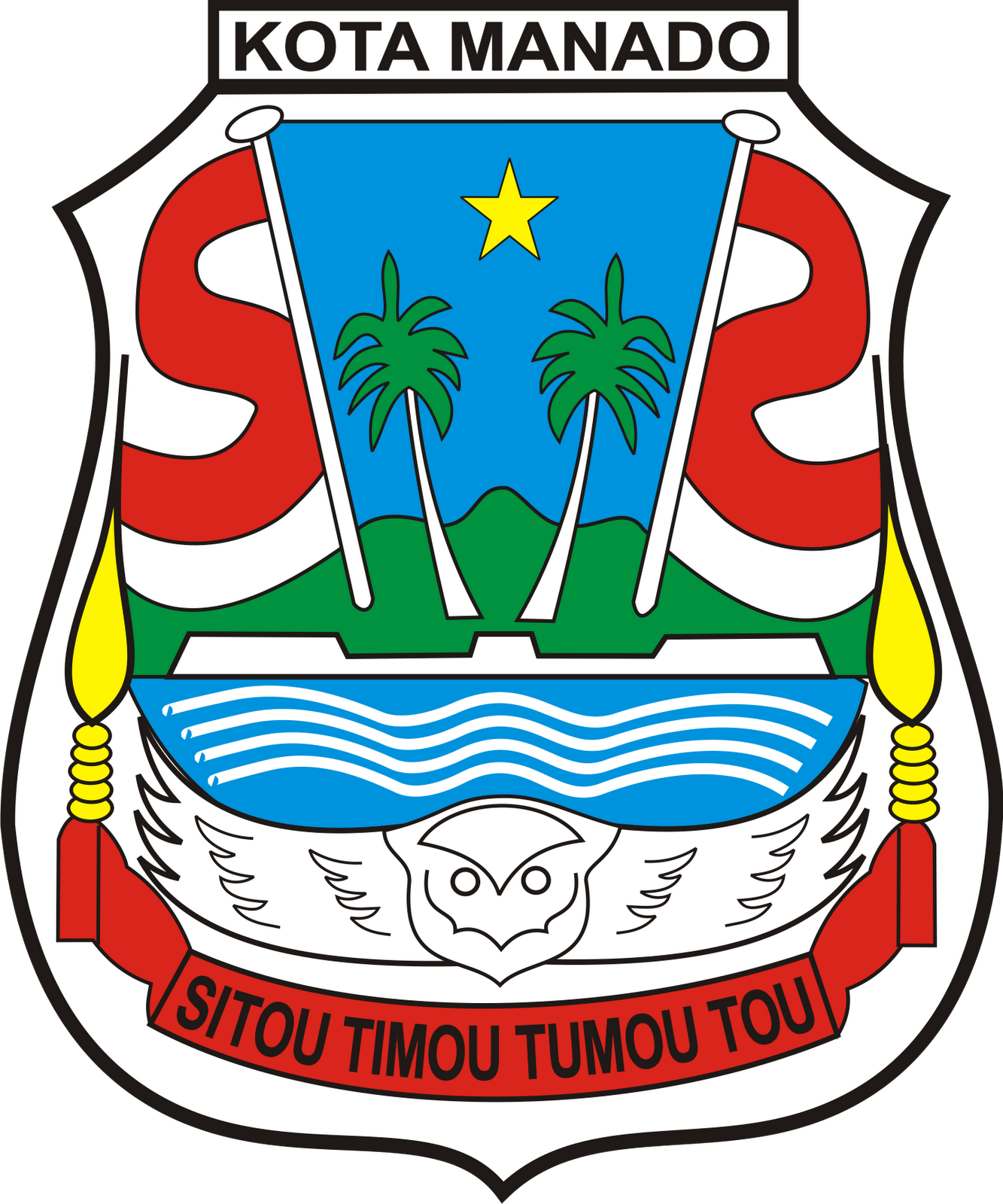
Manado City

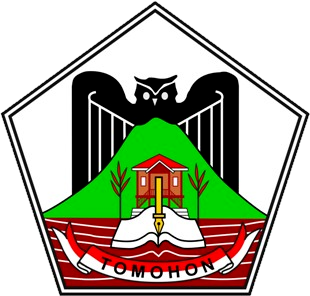
Tomohon City

=== Maluku ===
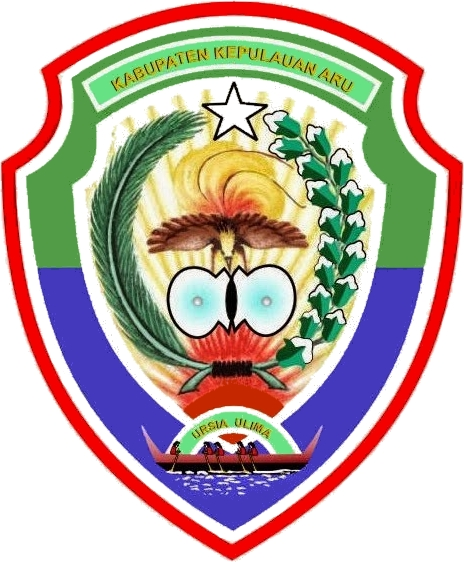
Aru Islands Regency

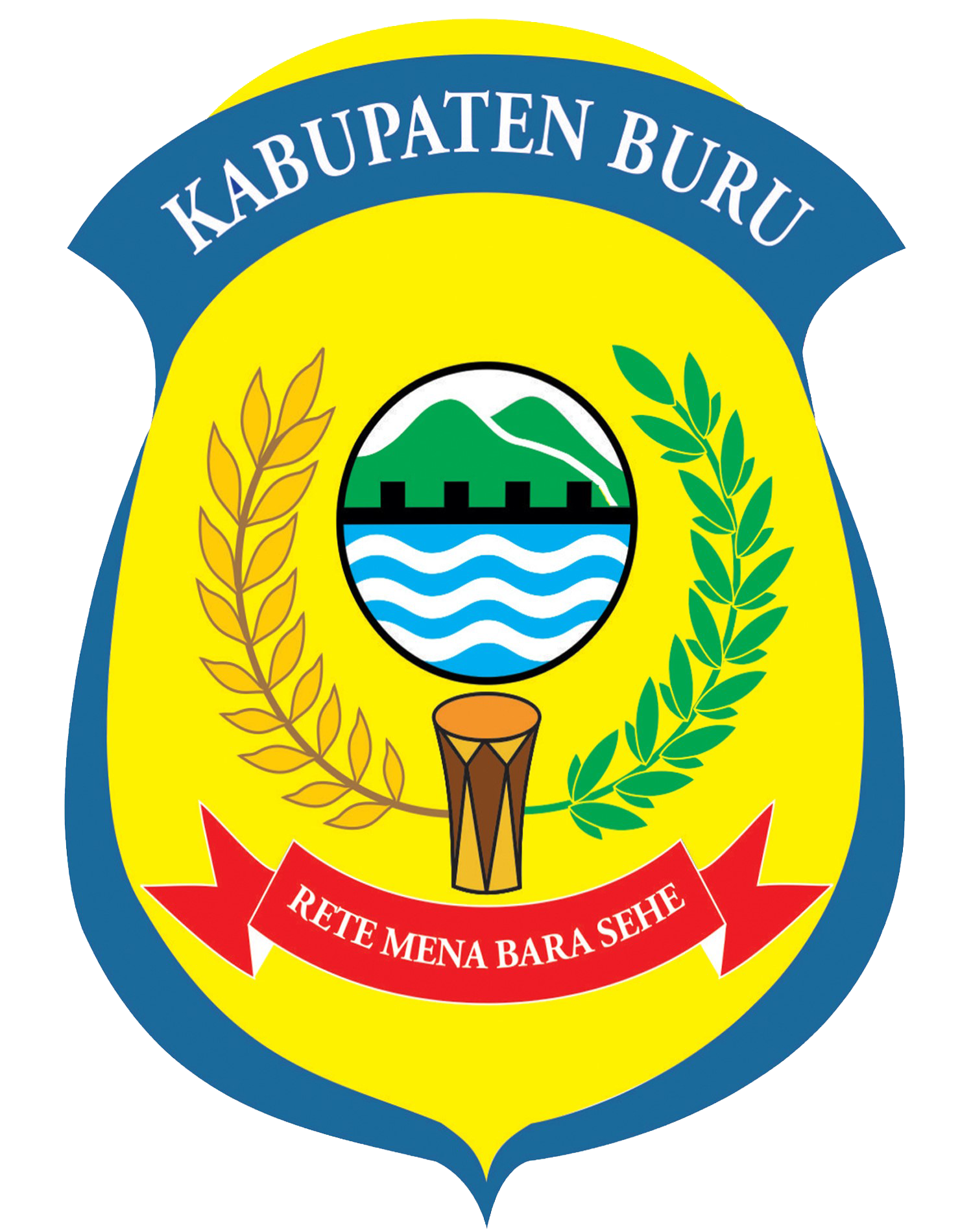
Buru Regency

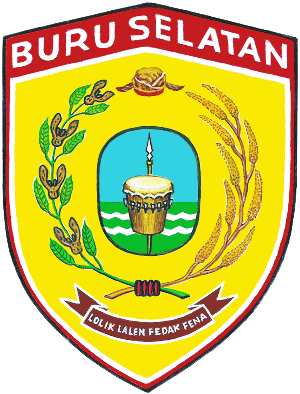
South Buru Regency

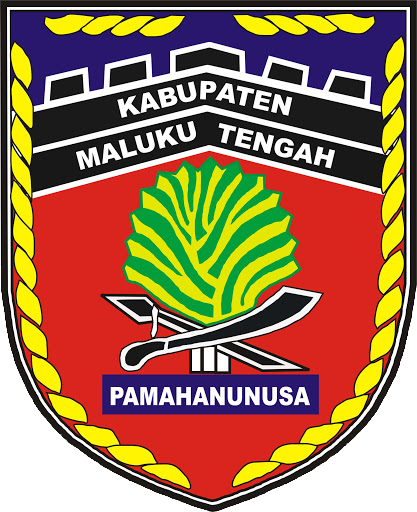
Central Maluku Regency

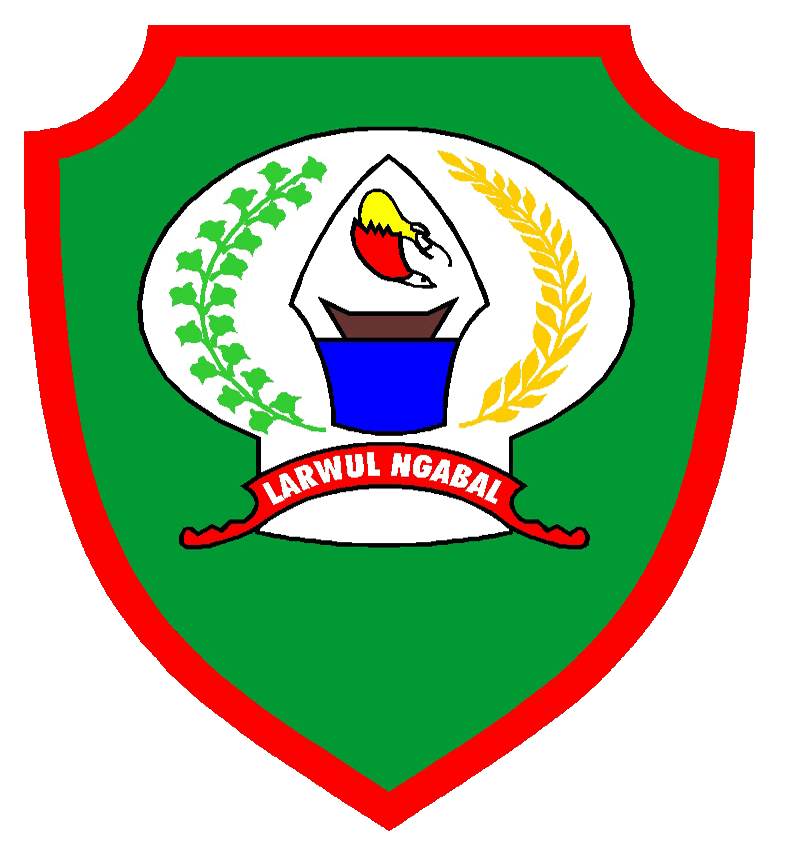
Southeast Maluku Regency

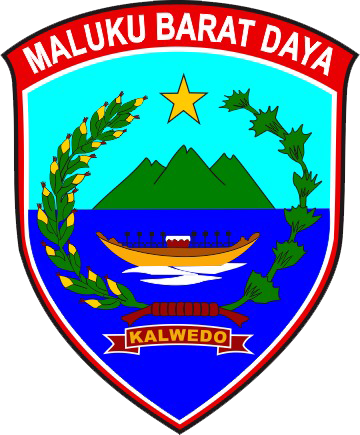
Southwest Maluku Regency

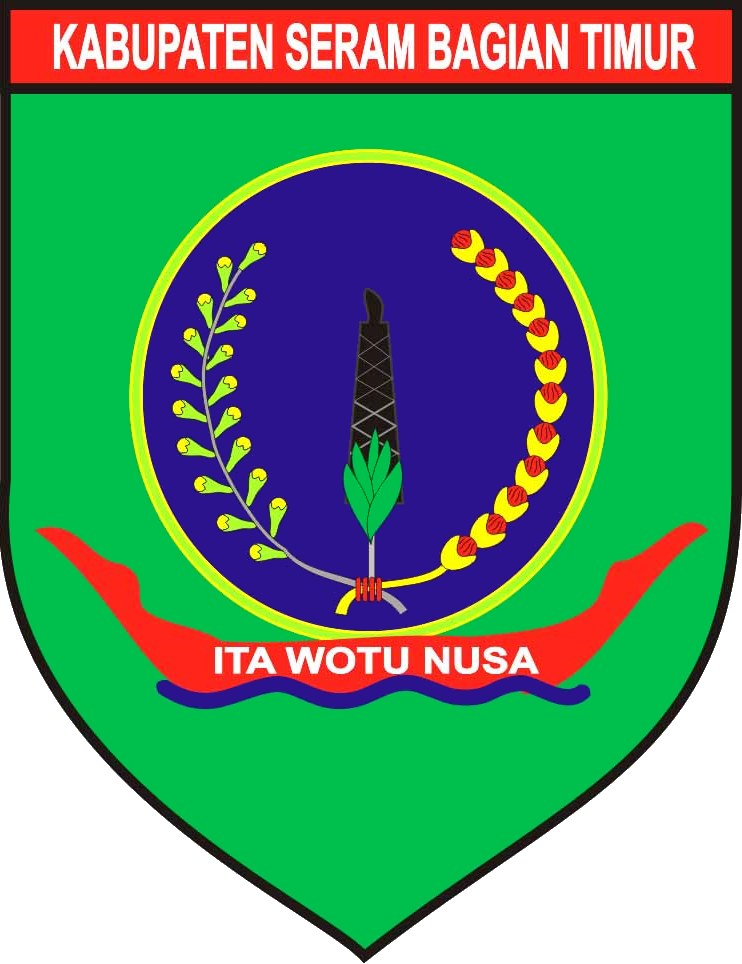
East Seram Regency

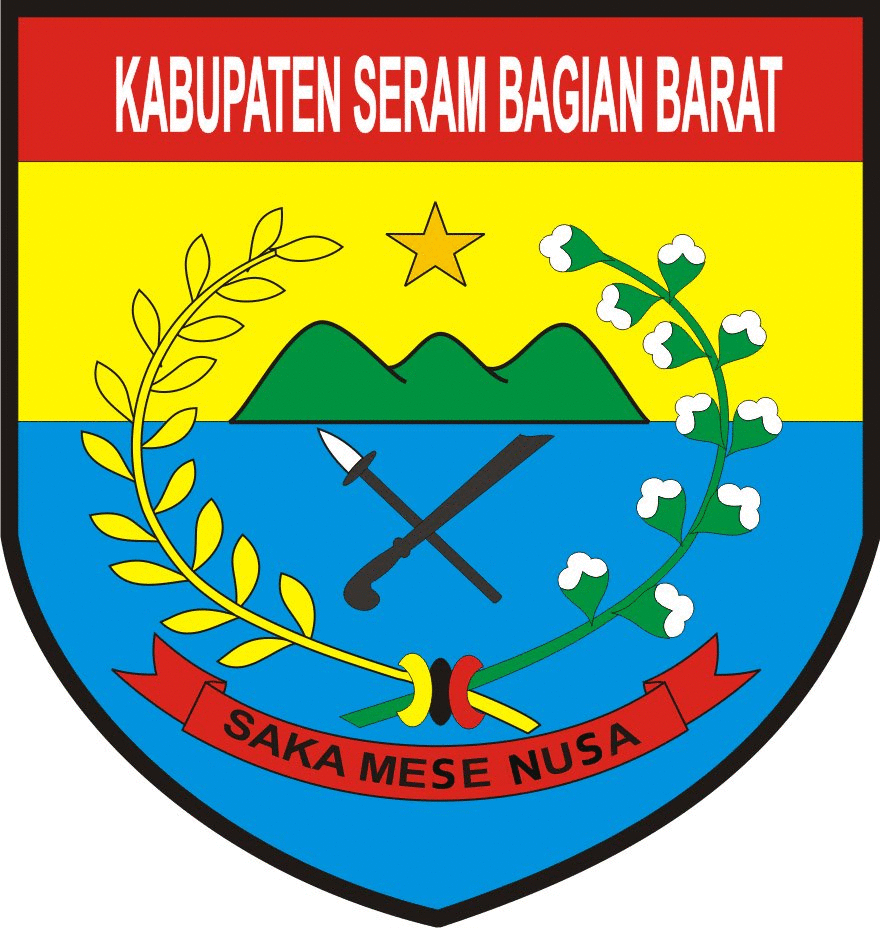
West Seram Regency

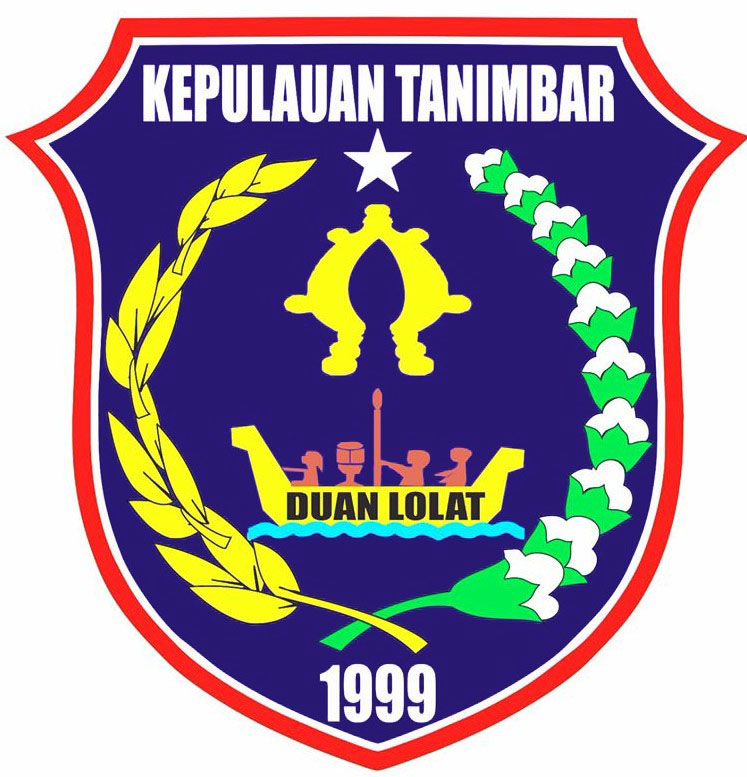
Tanimbar Islands Regency

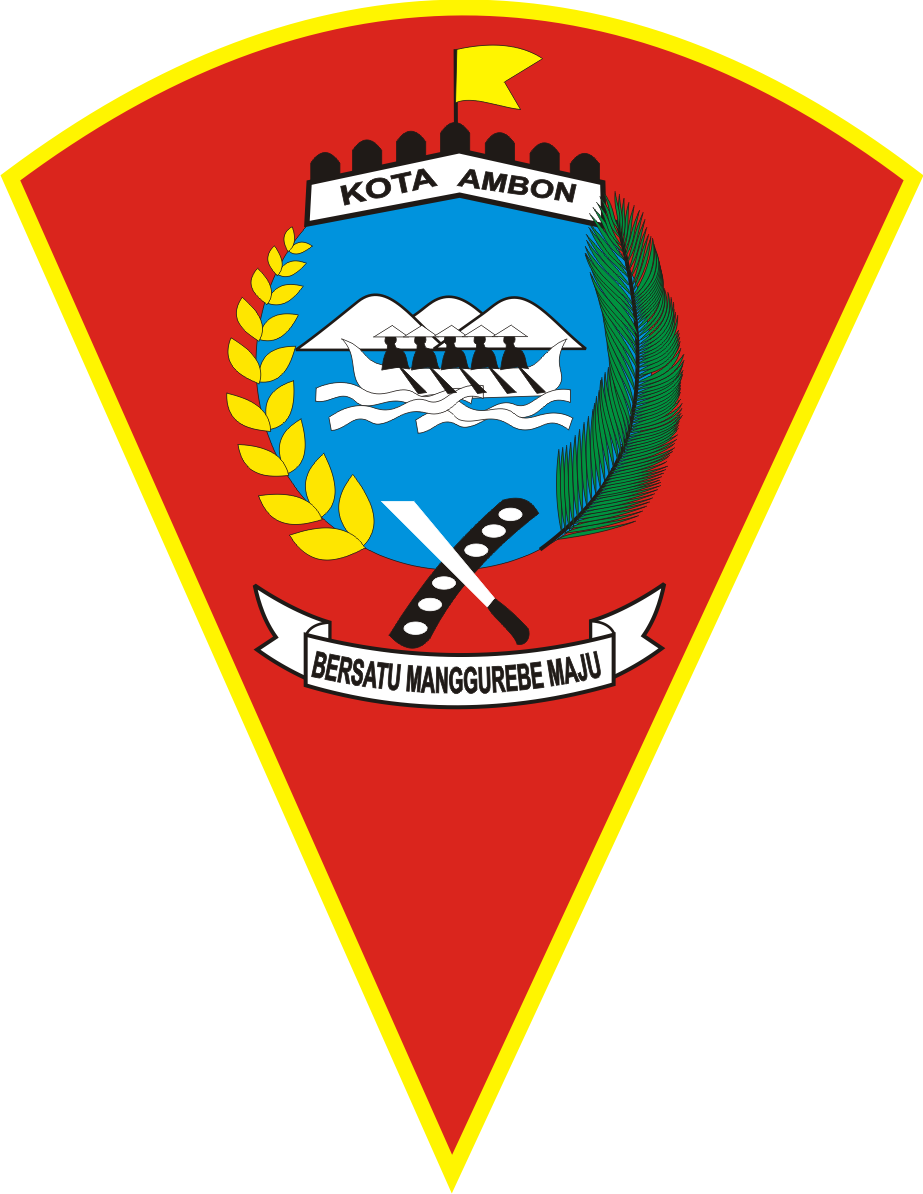
Ambon City

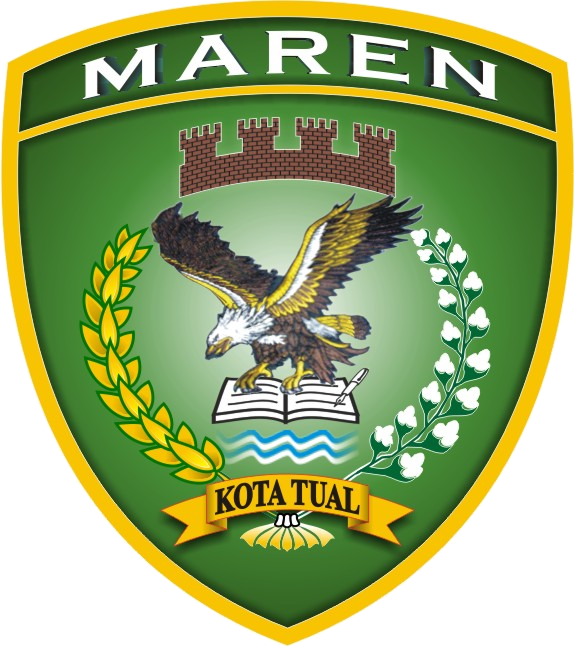
Tual City

=== North Maluku ===
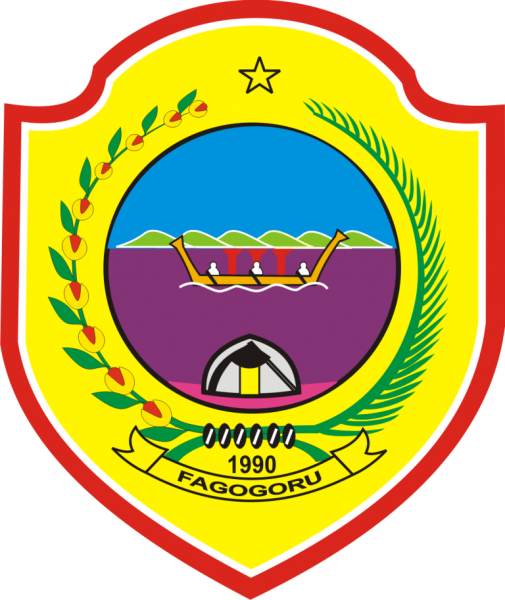
Central Halmahera Regency

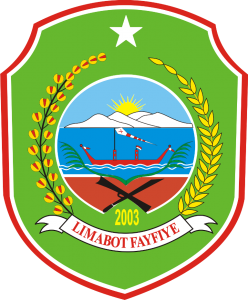
East Halmahera Regency

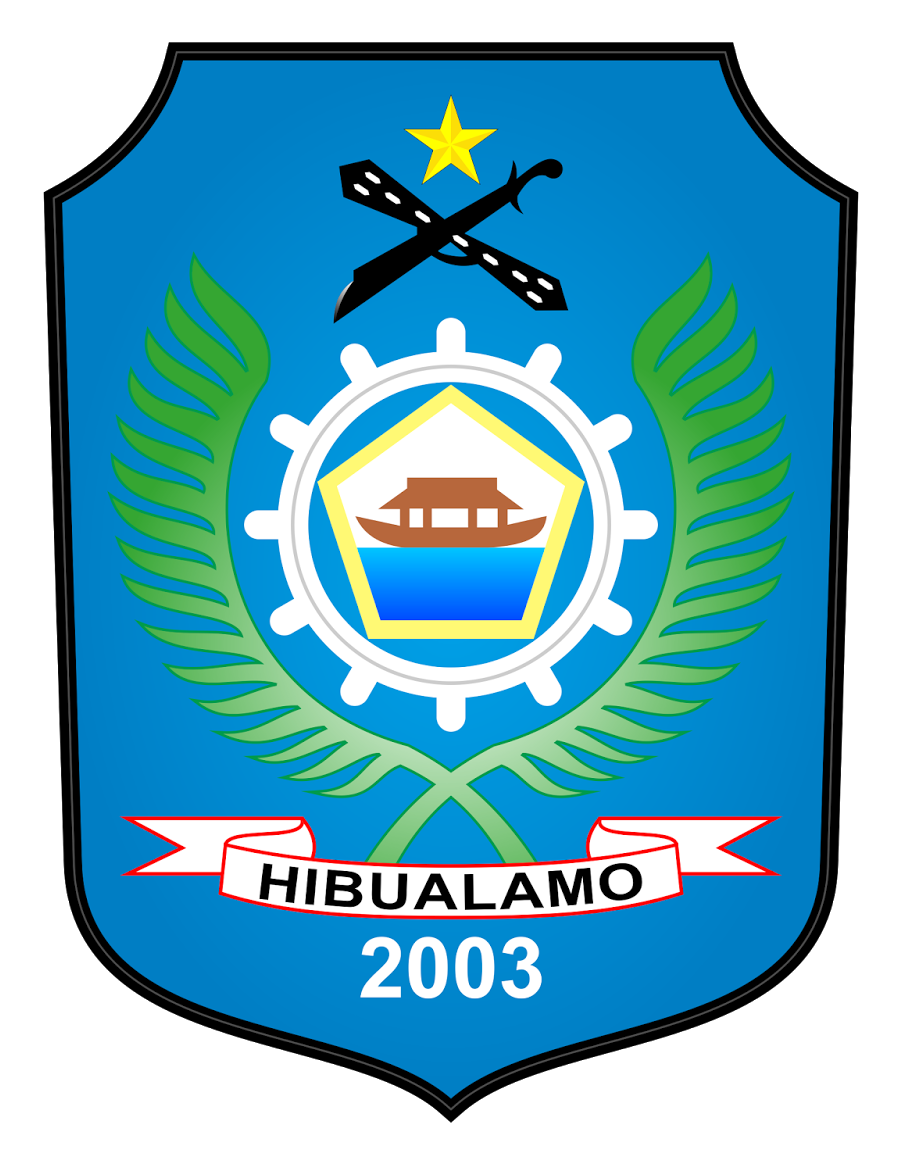
North Halmahera Regency

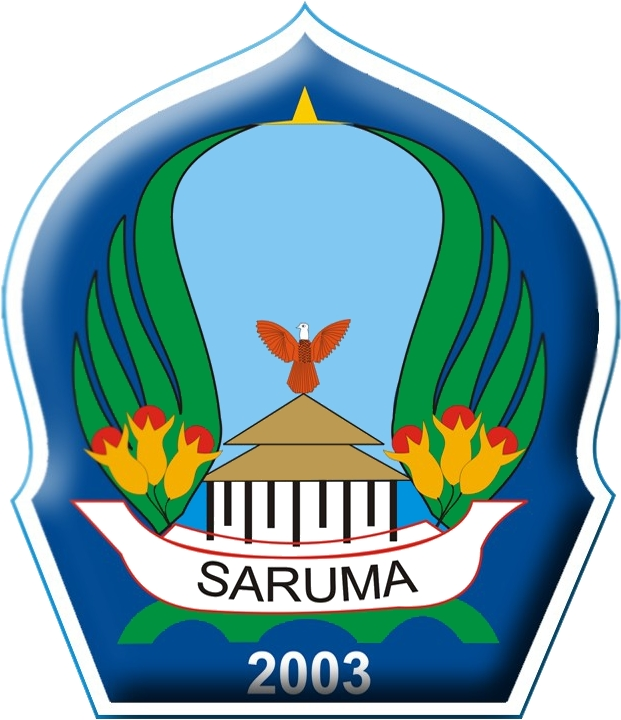
South Halmahera Regency

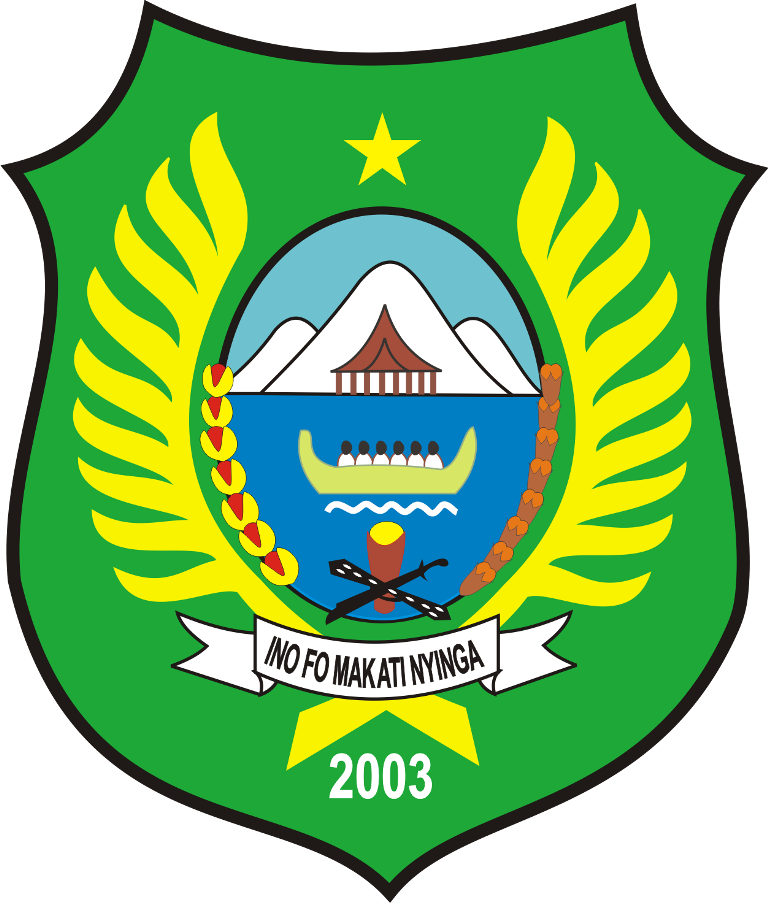
West Halmahera Regency

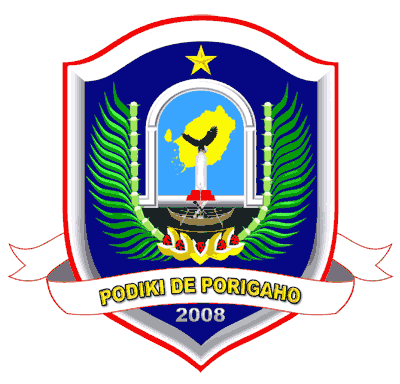
Morotai Island Regency

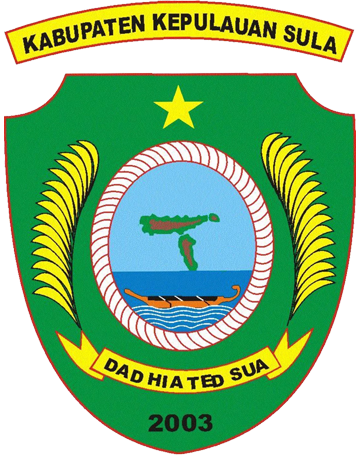
Sula Islands Regency

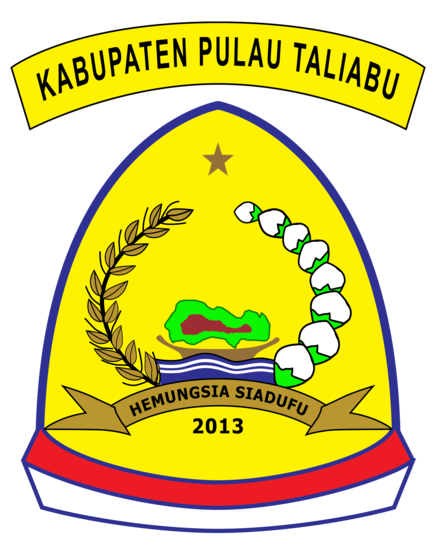
Taliabu Island Regency

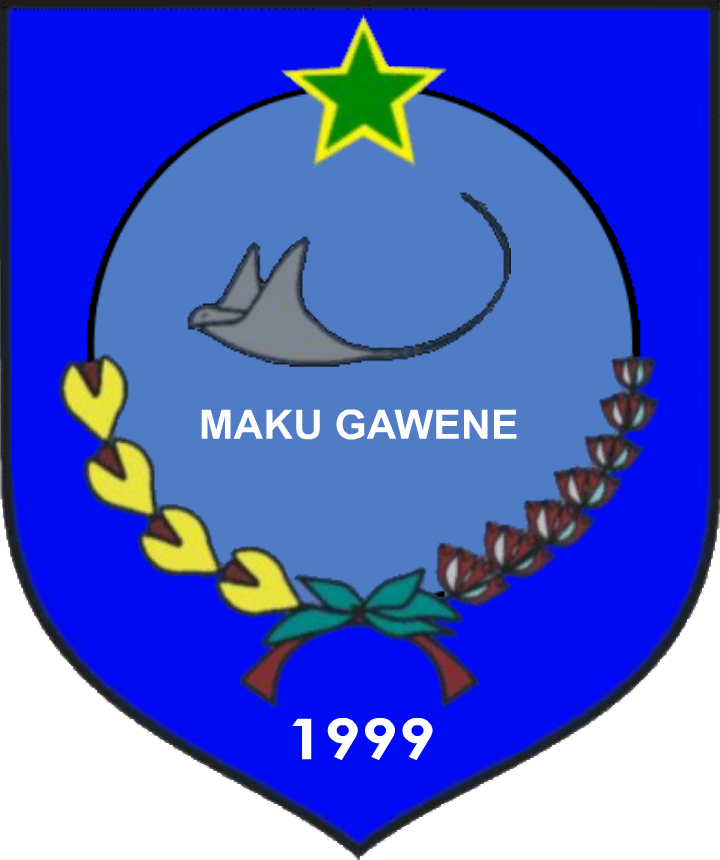
Ternate City

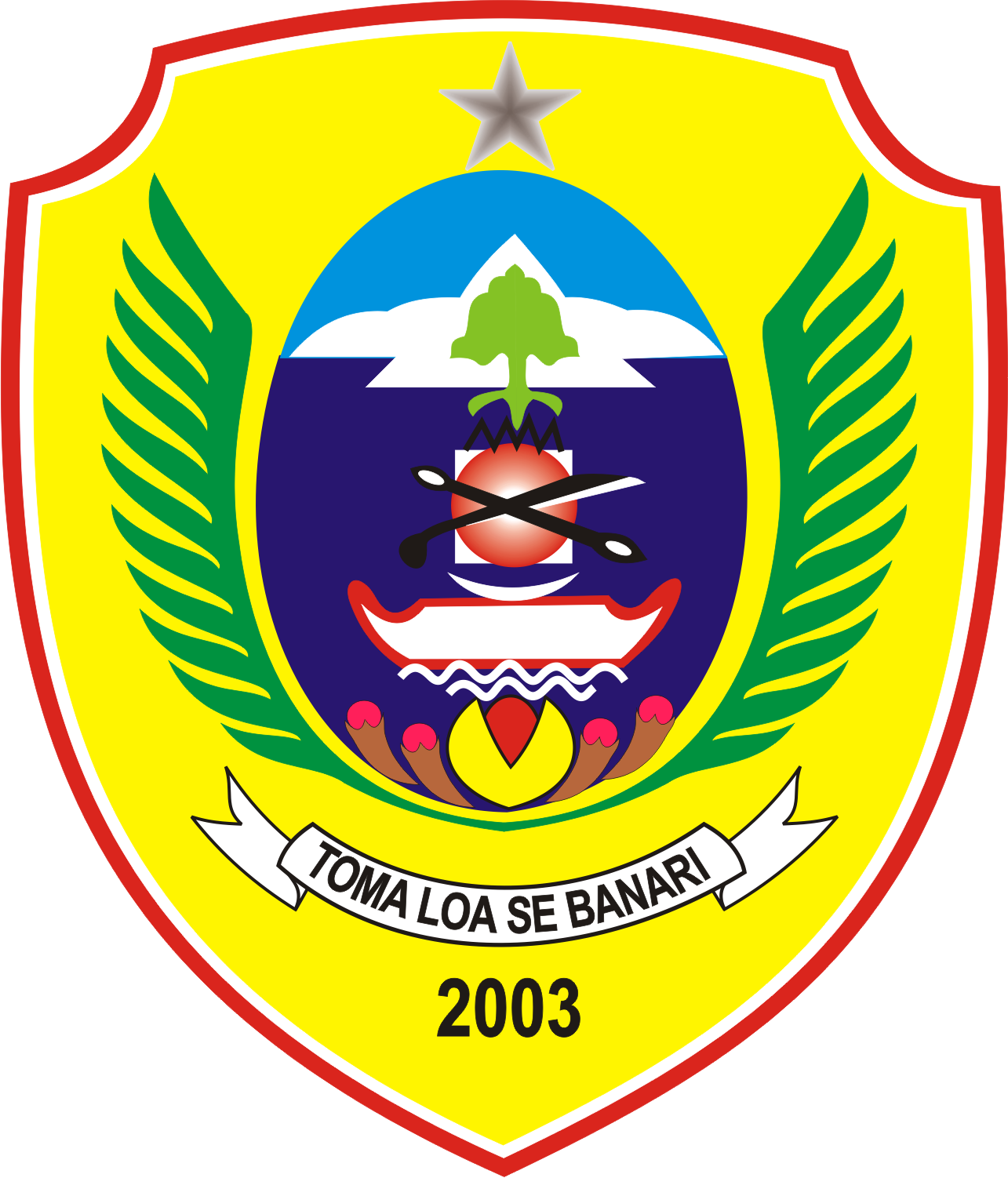
Tidore Islands City

=== Southwest Papua ===
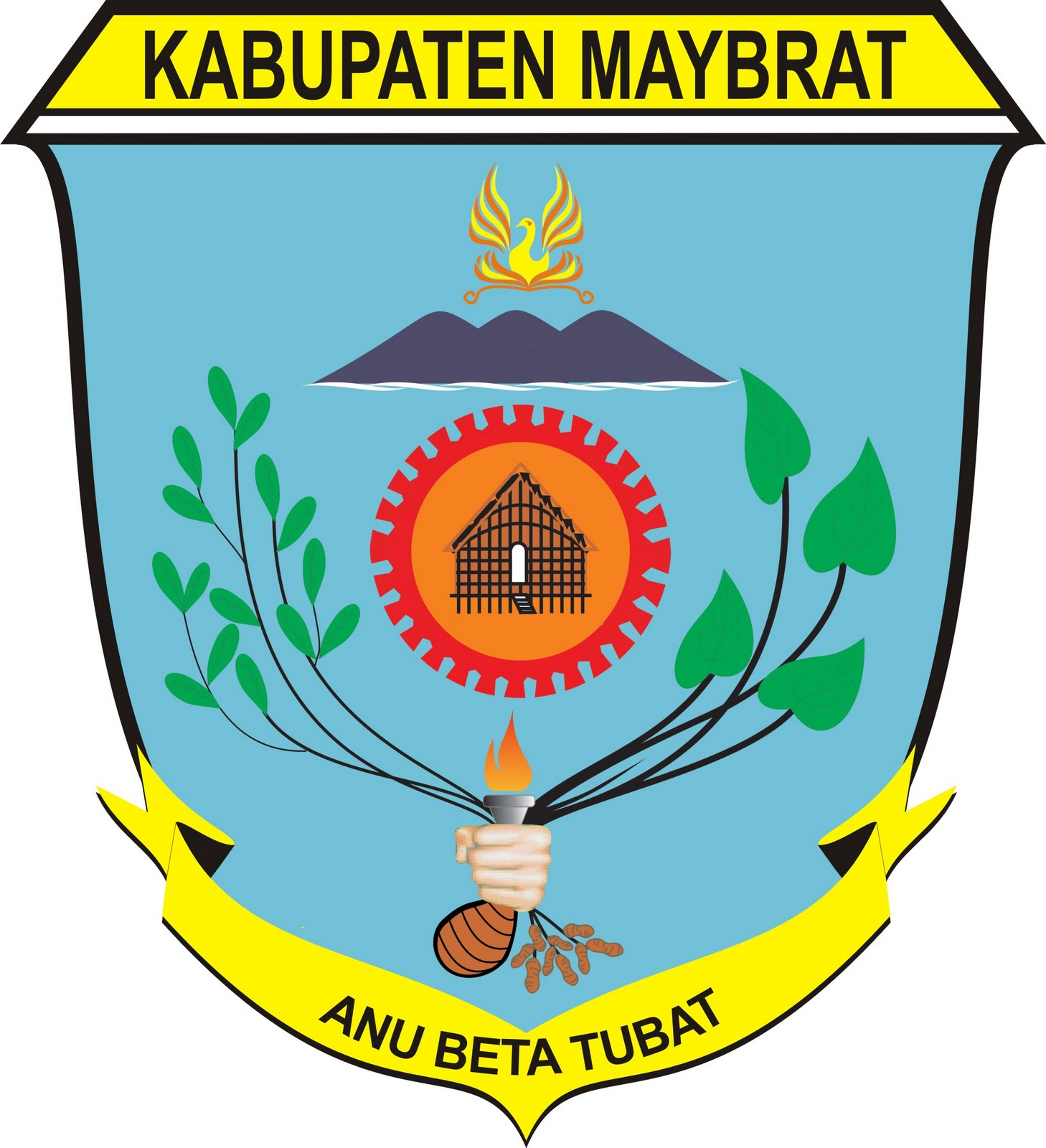
Maybrat Regency

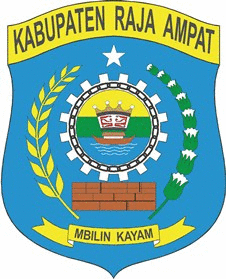
Raja Ampat Regency

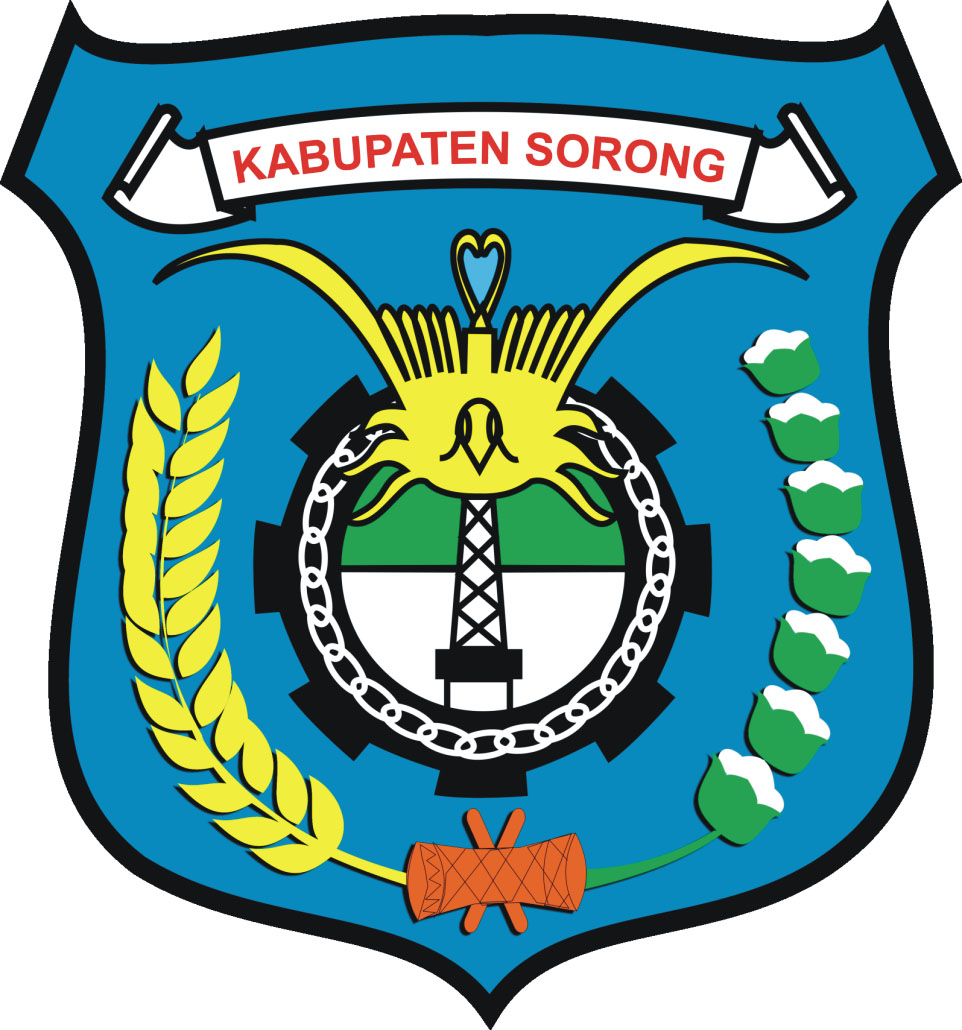
Sorong Regency

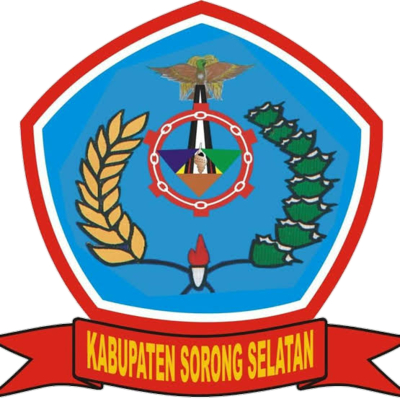
South Sorong Regency

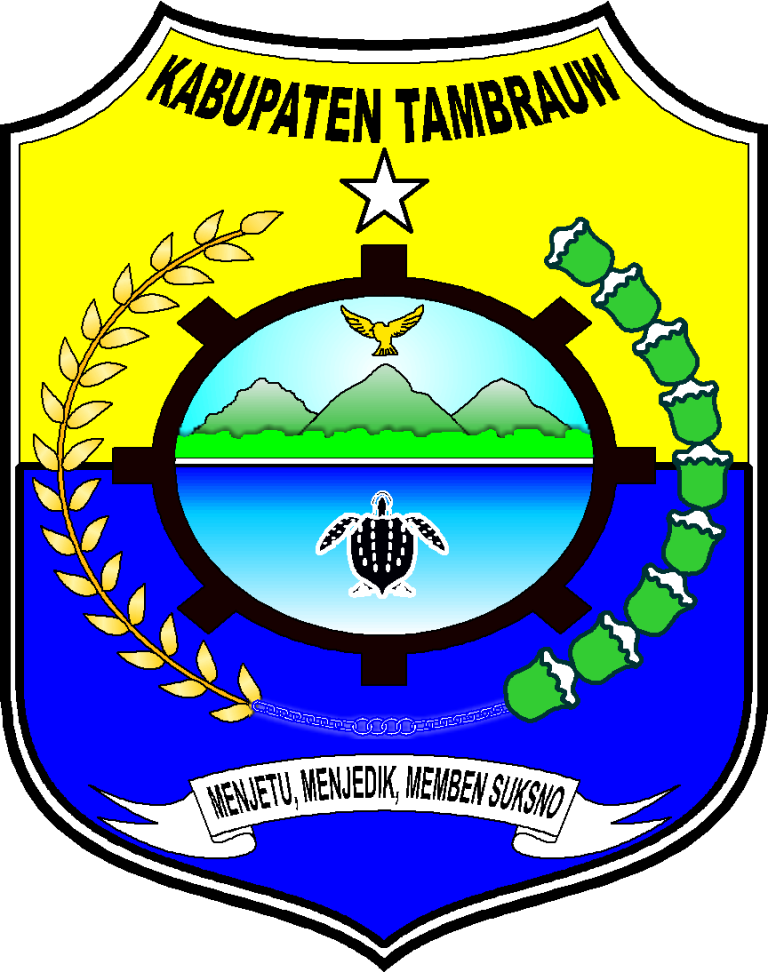
Tambrauw Regency

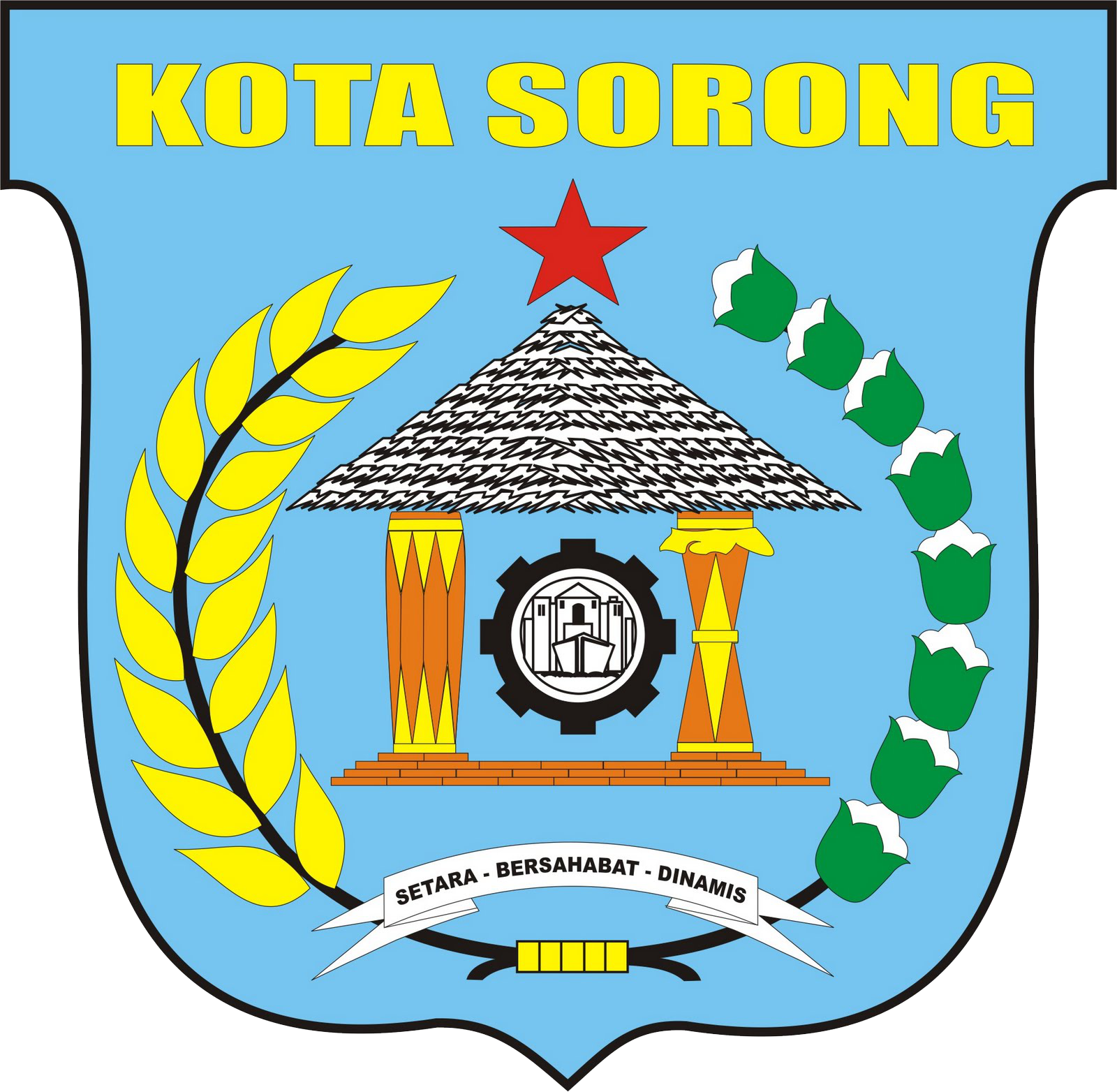
Sorong City

=== West Papua ===
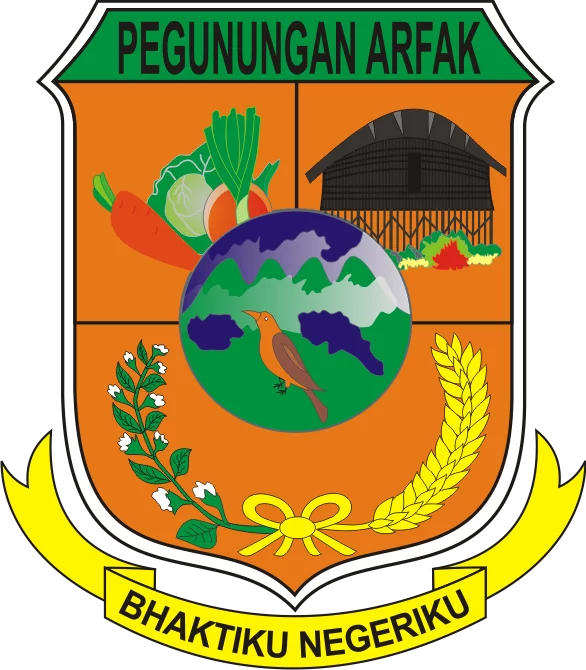
Arfak Mountains Regency

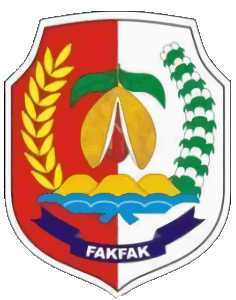
Fakfak Regency

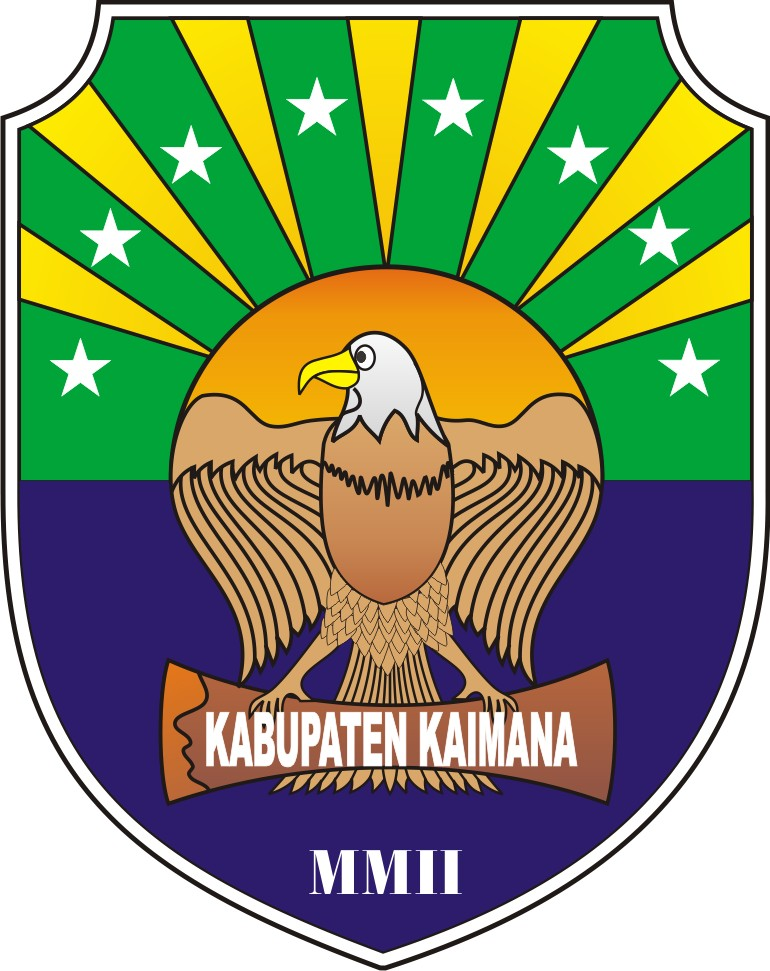
Kaimana Regency

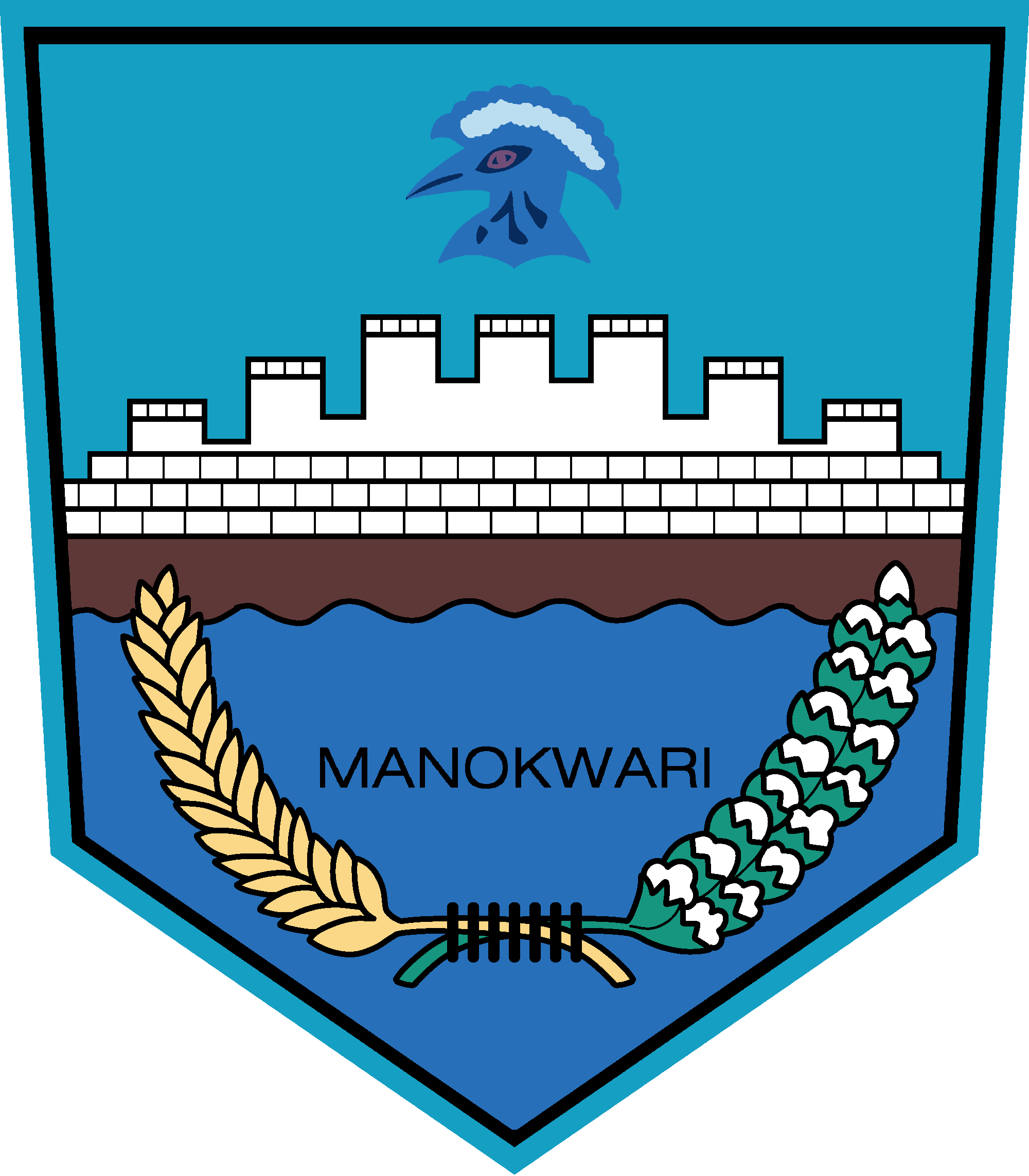
Manokwari Regency

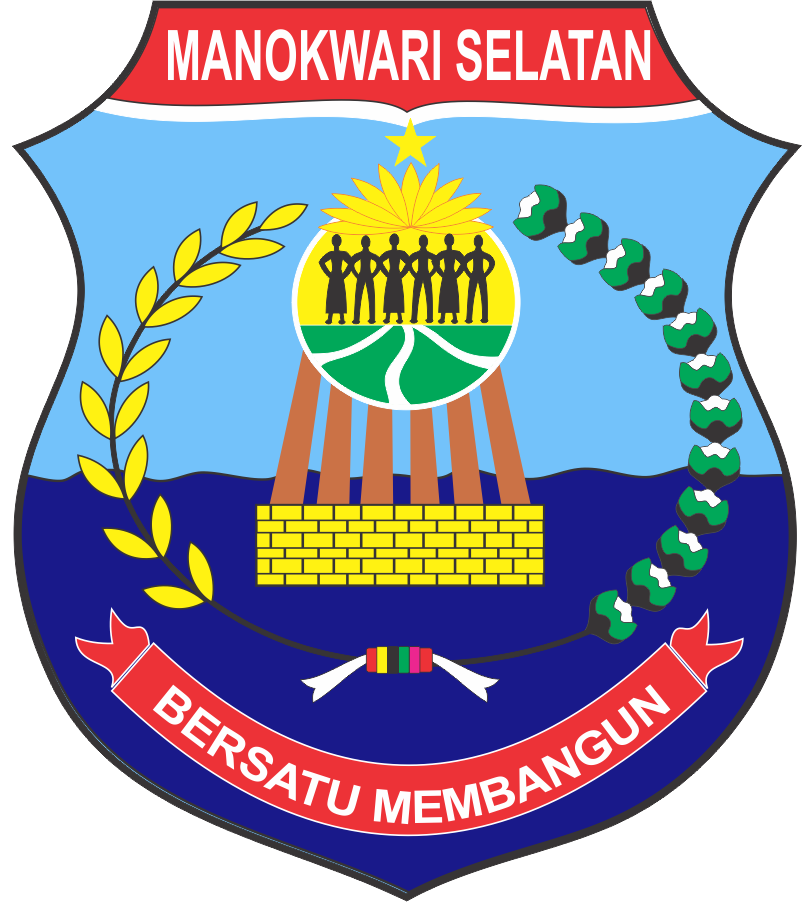
South Manokwari Regency

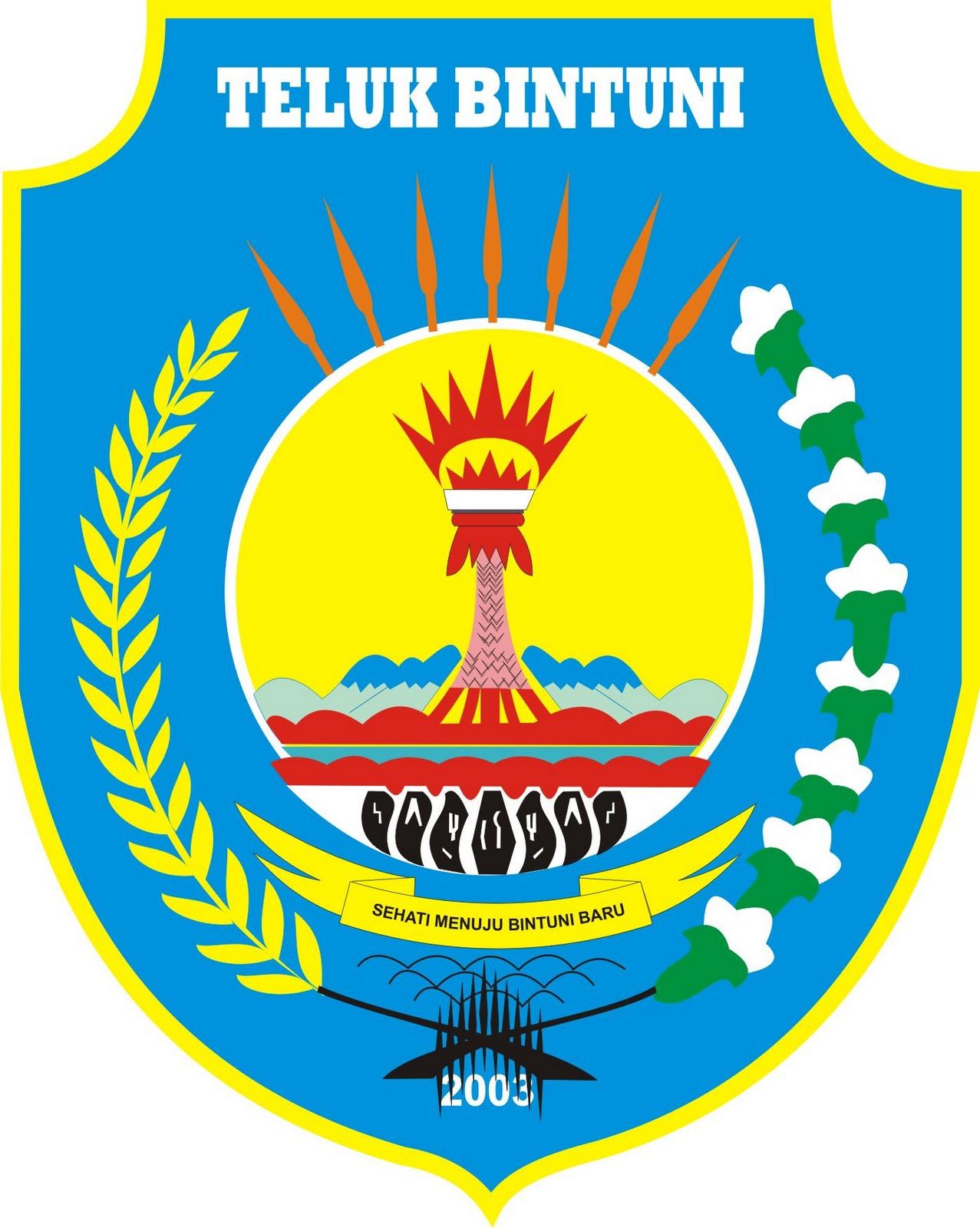
Teluk Bintuni Regency

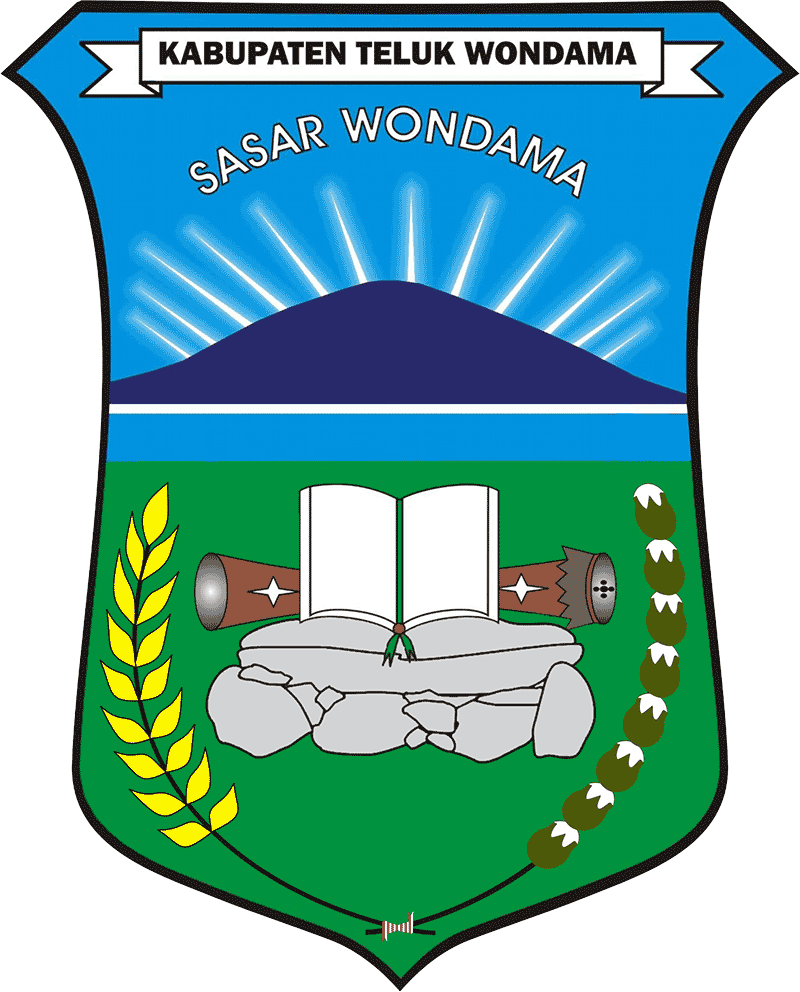
Teluk Wondama Regency

=== Central Papua ===
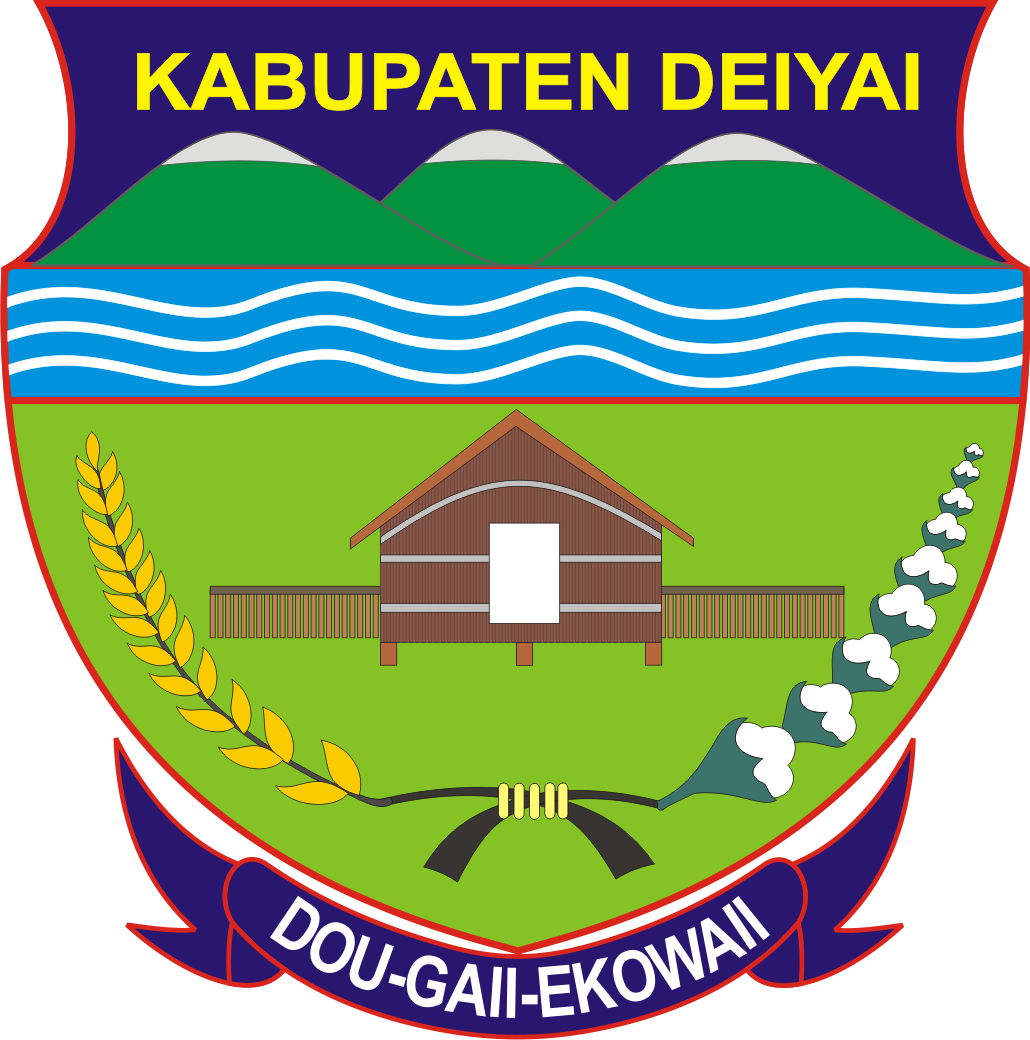
Deiyai Regency

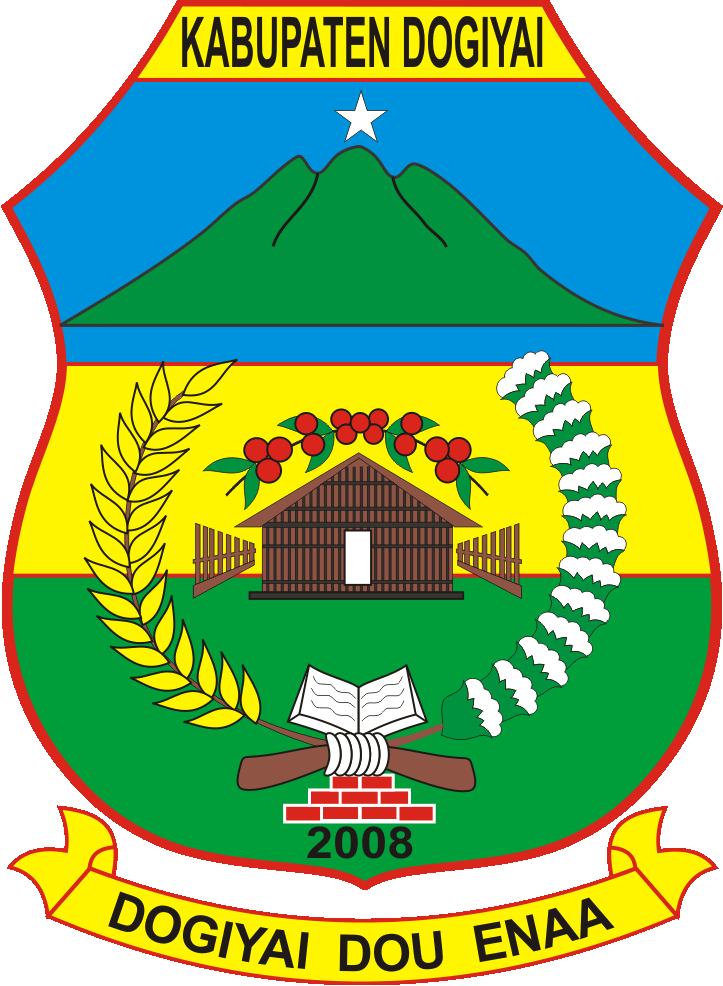
Dogiyai Regency

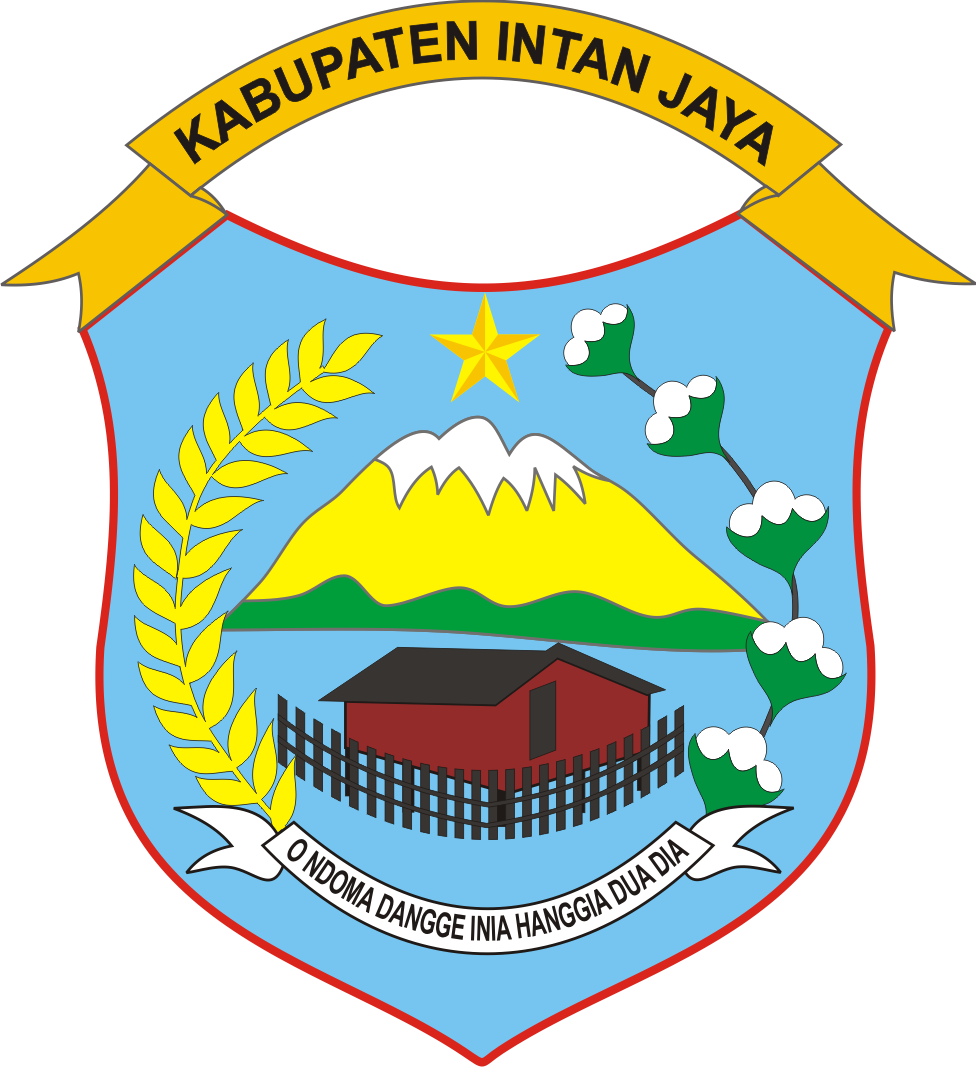
Intan Jaya Regency

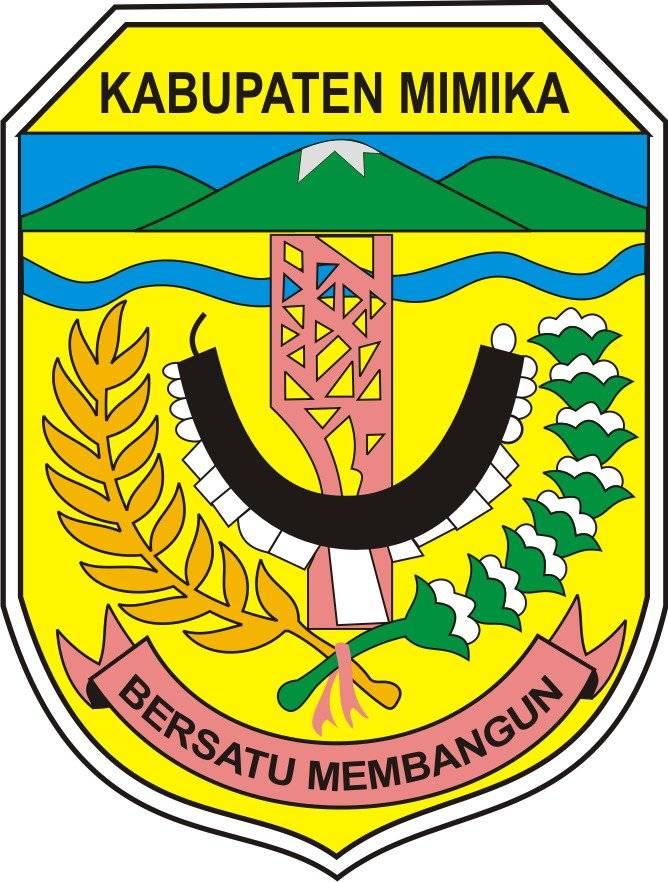
Mimika Regency

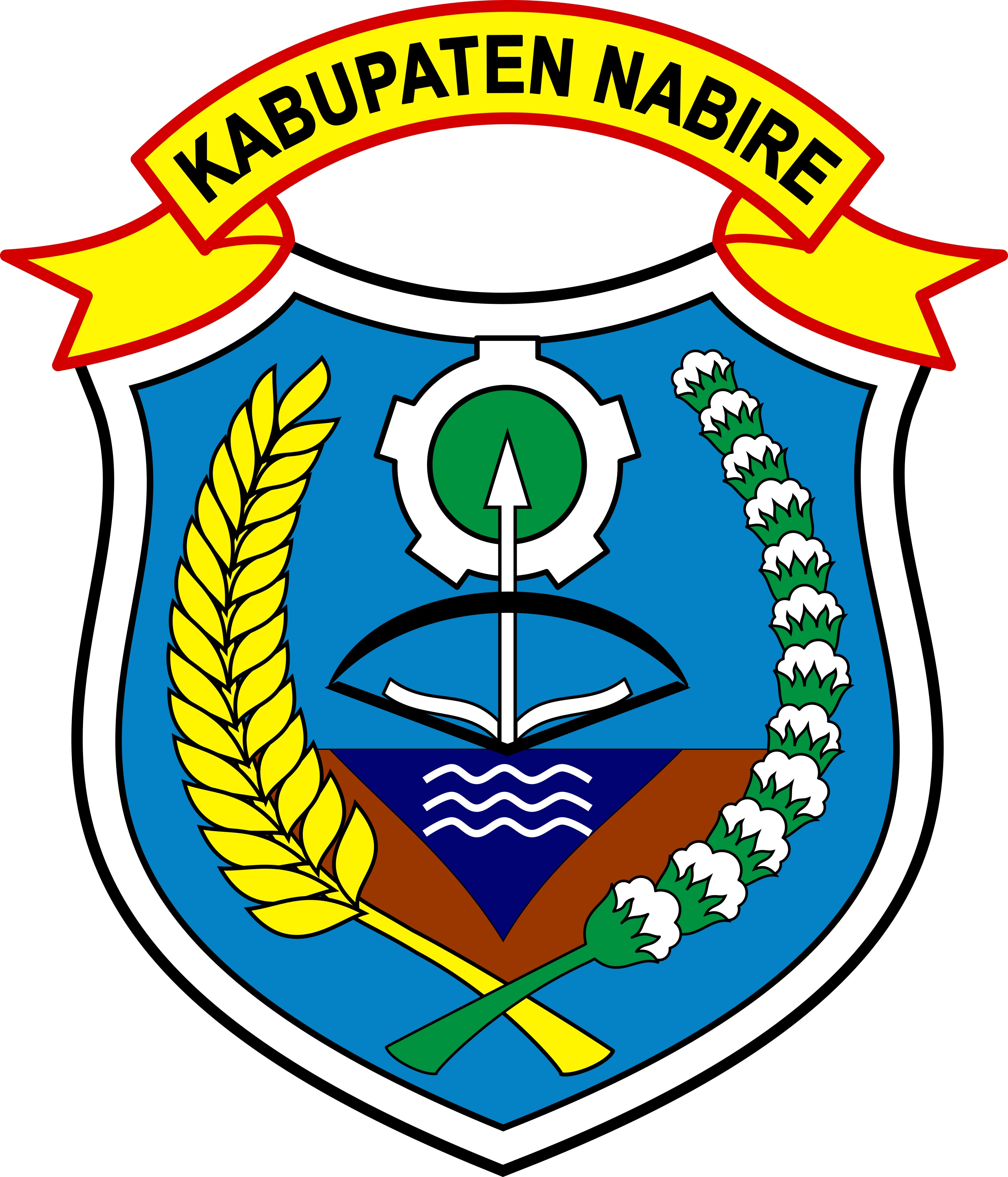
Nabire Regency

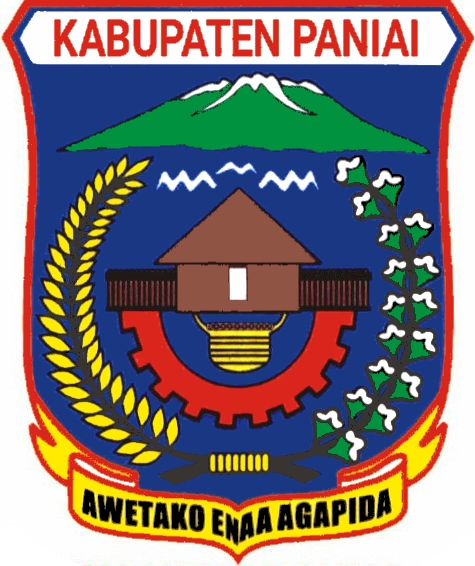
Paniai Regency

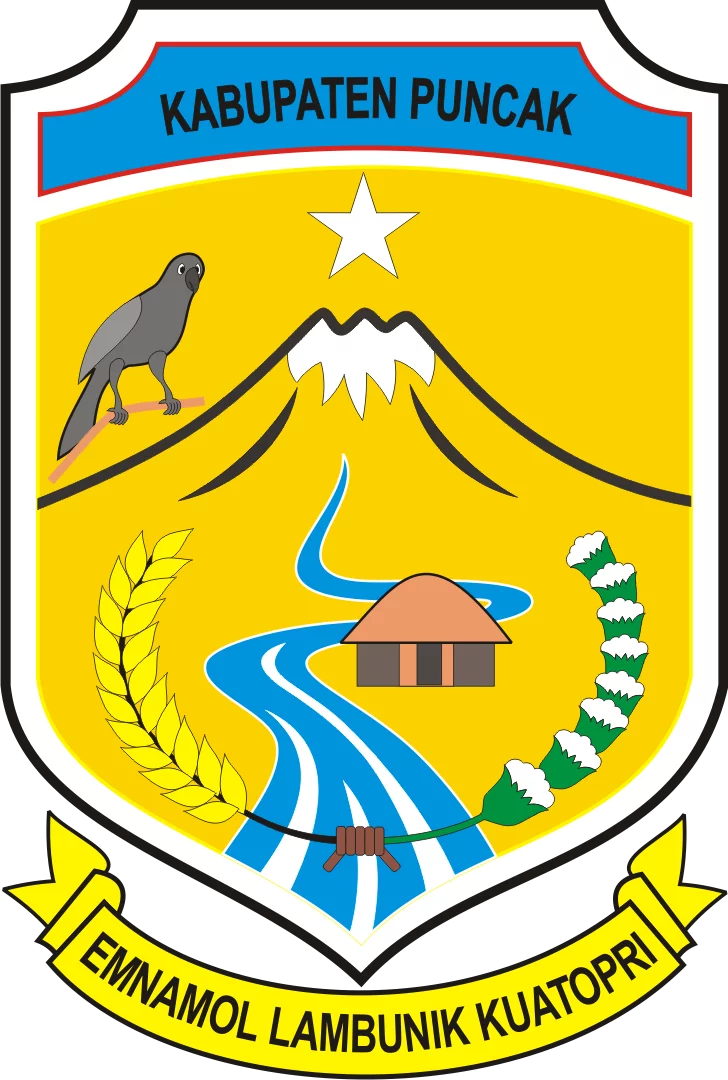
Puncak Regency

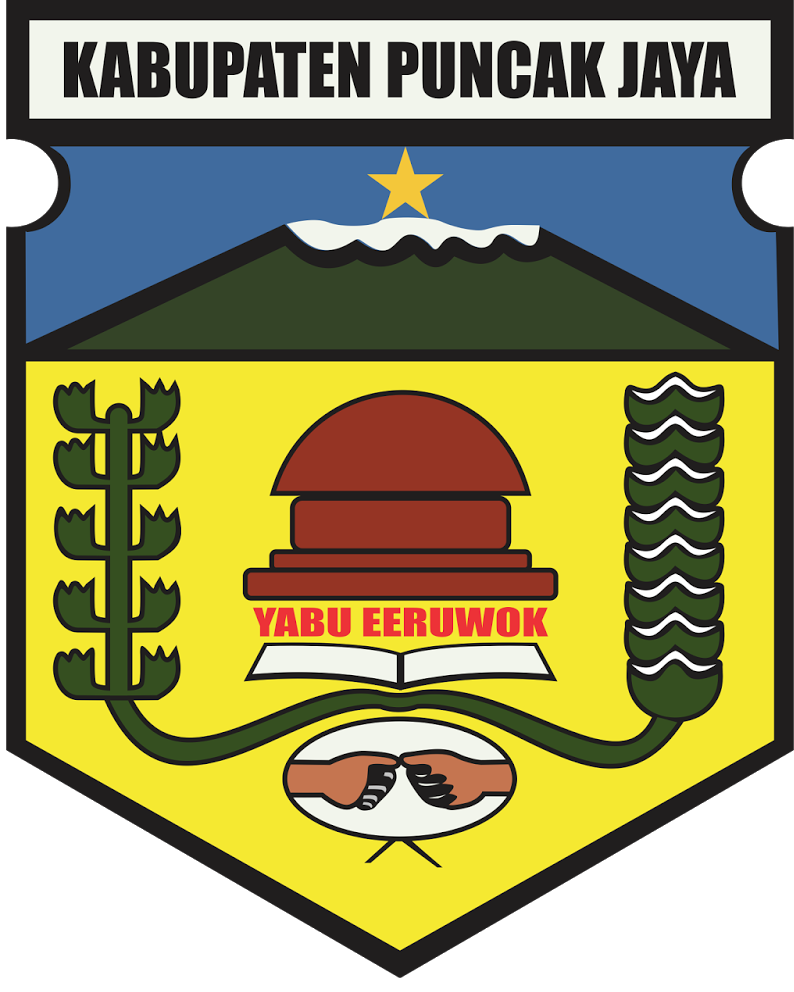
Puncak Jaya Regency

=== South Papua ===
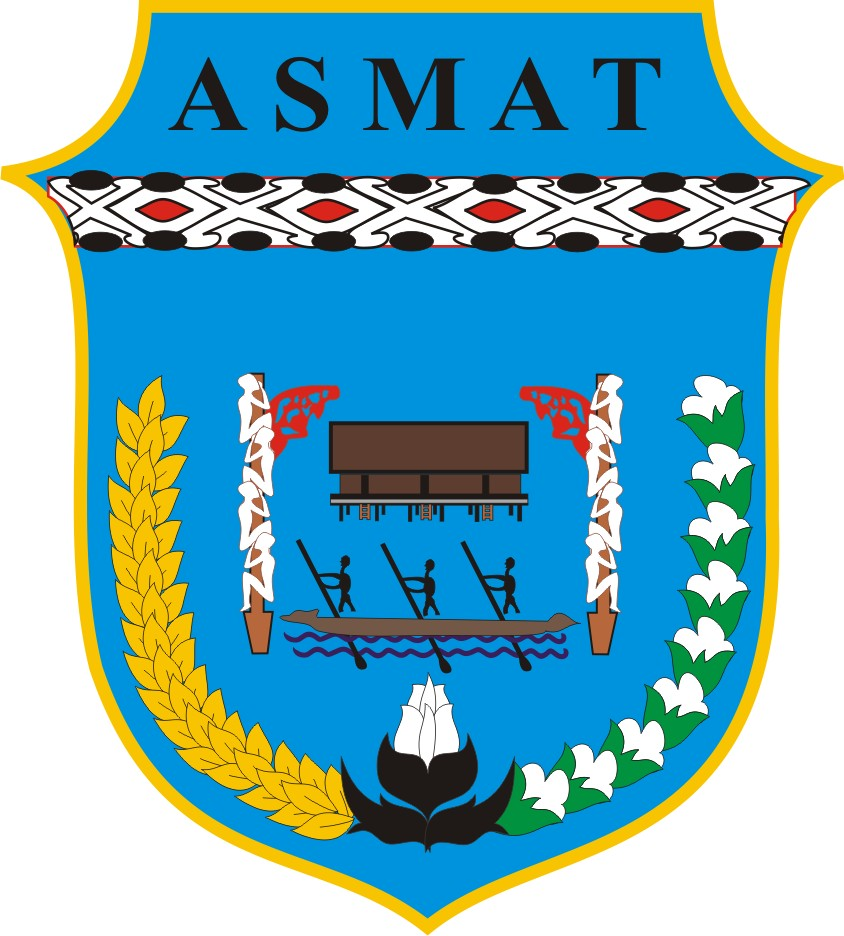
Asmat Regency

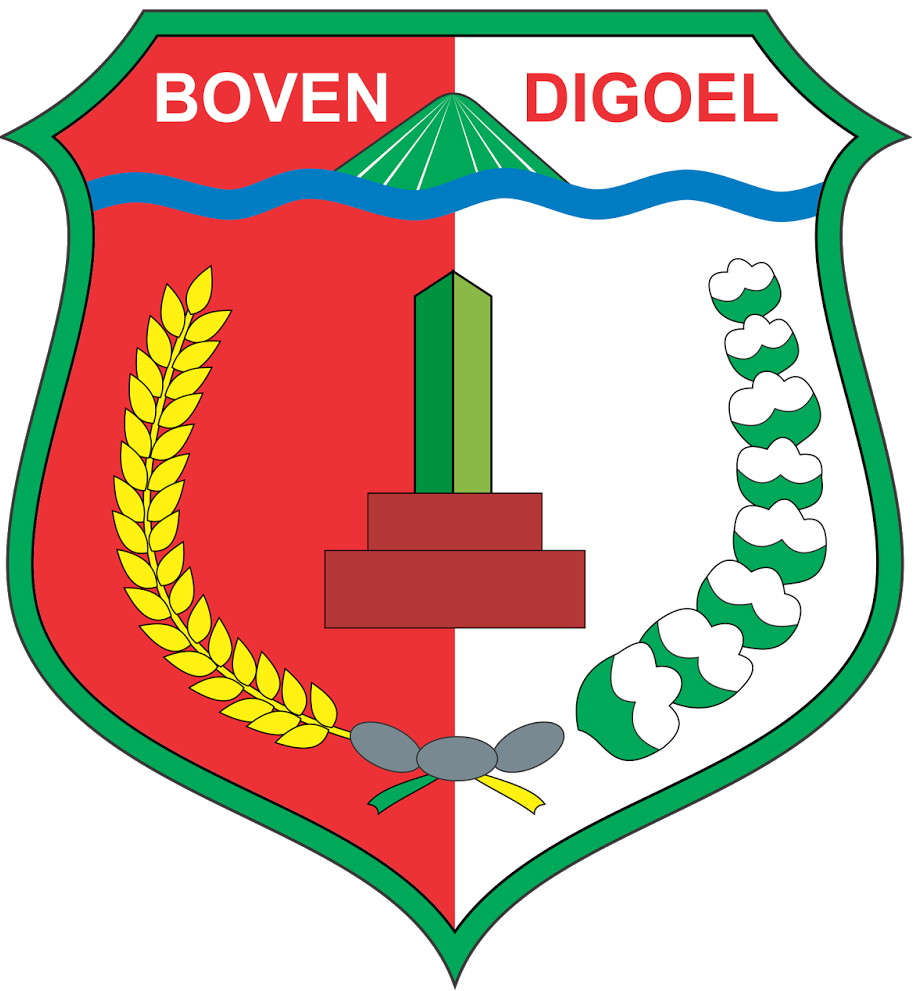
Boven Digoel Regency

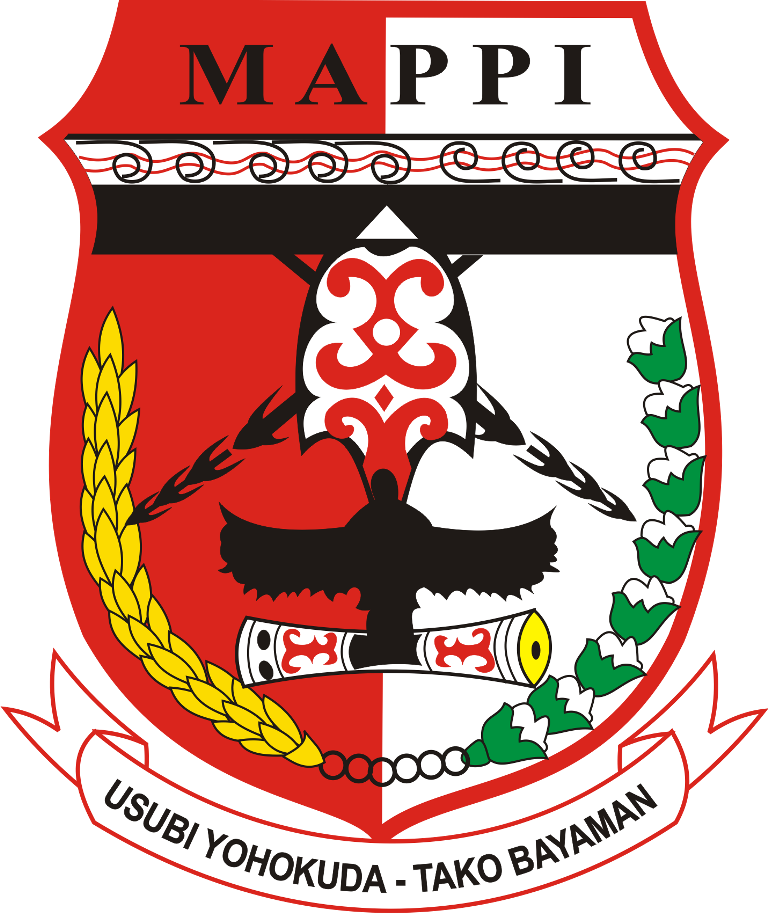
Mappi Regency

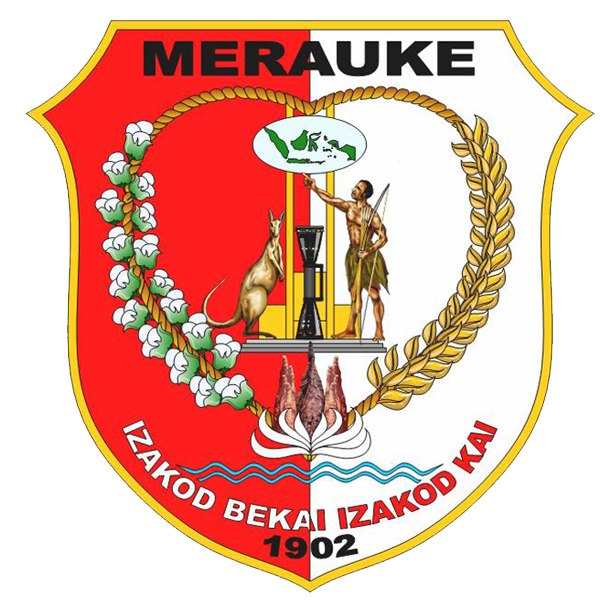
Merauke Regency

=== Highland Papua ===
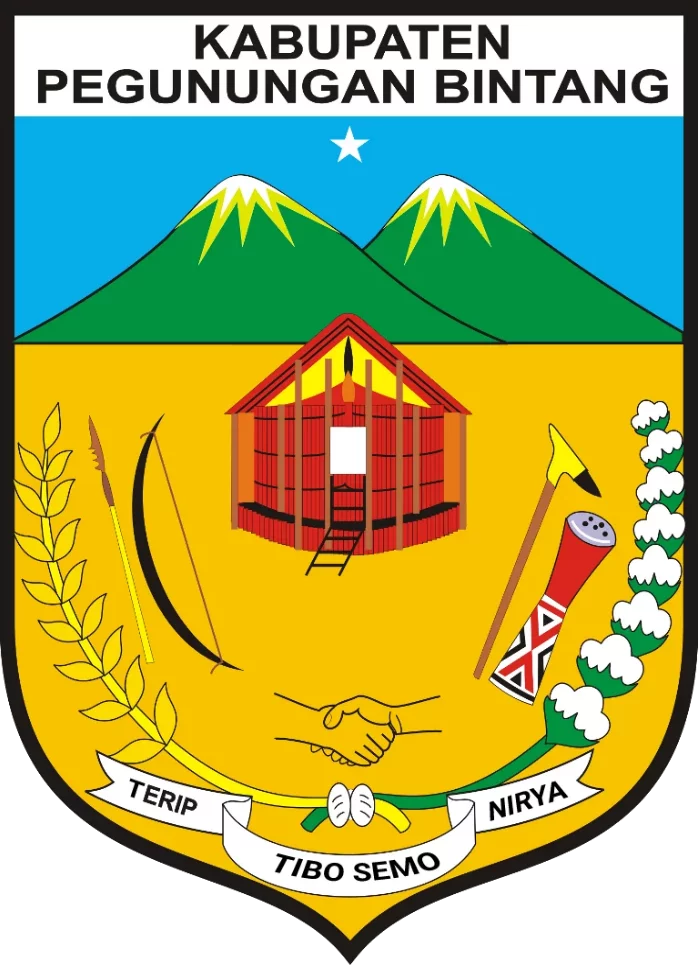
Bintang Mountains Regency

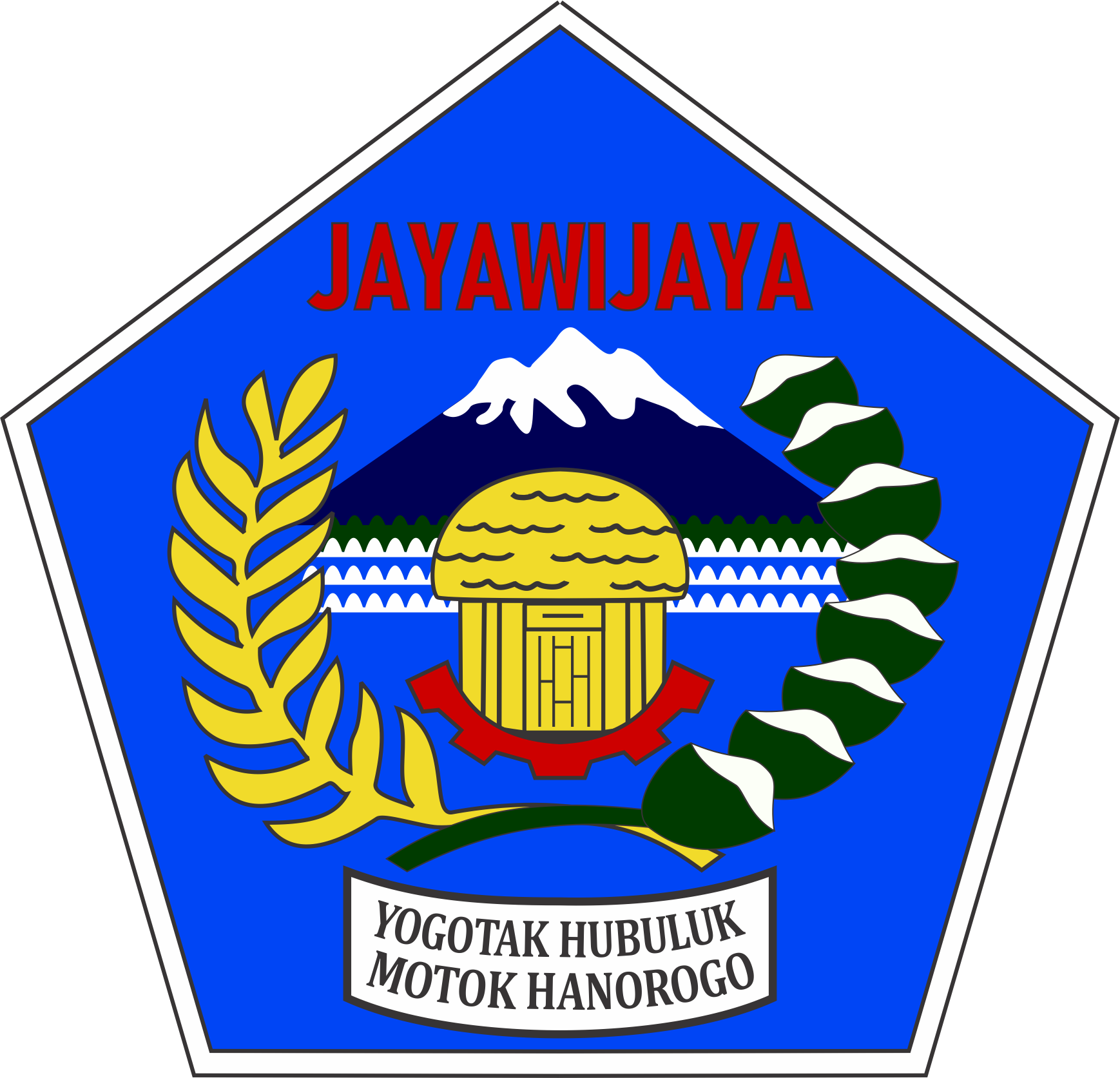
Jayawijaya Regency

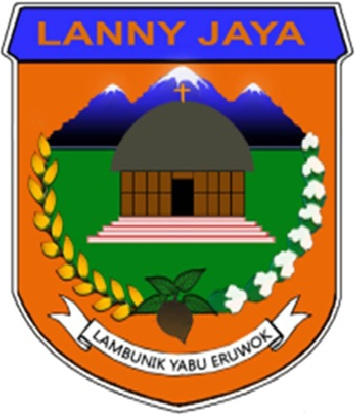
Lanny Jaya Regency

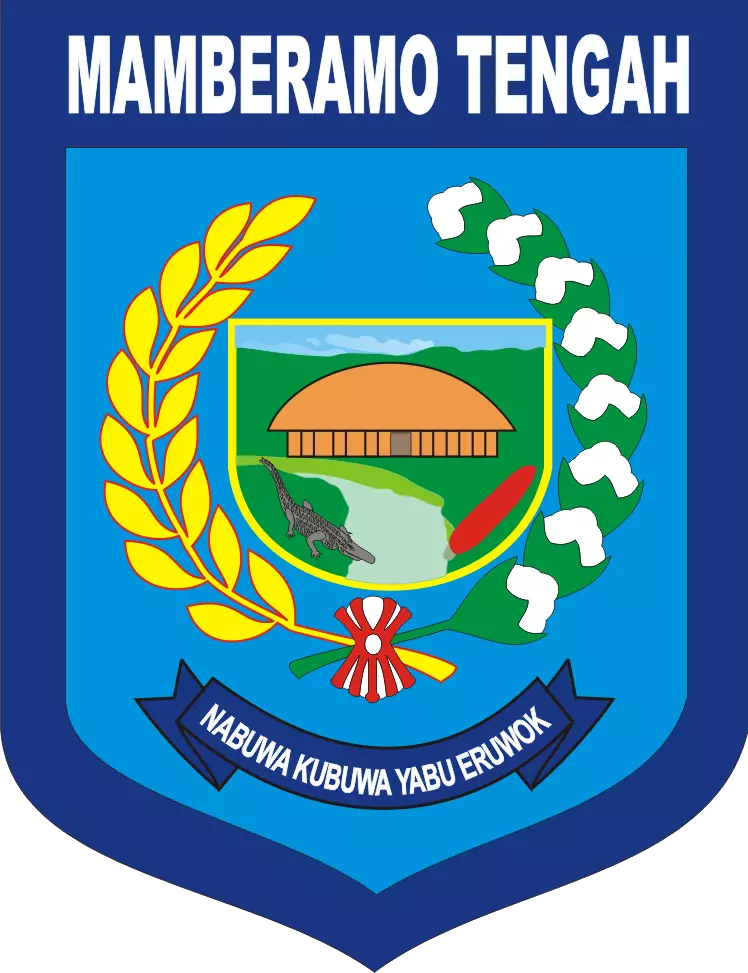
Central Mamberamo Regency

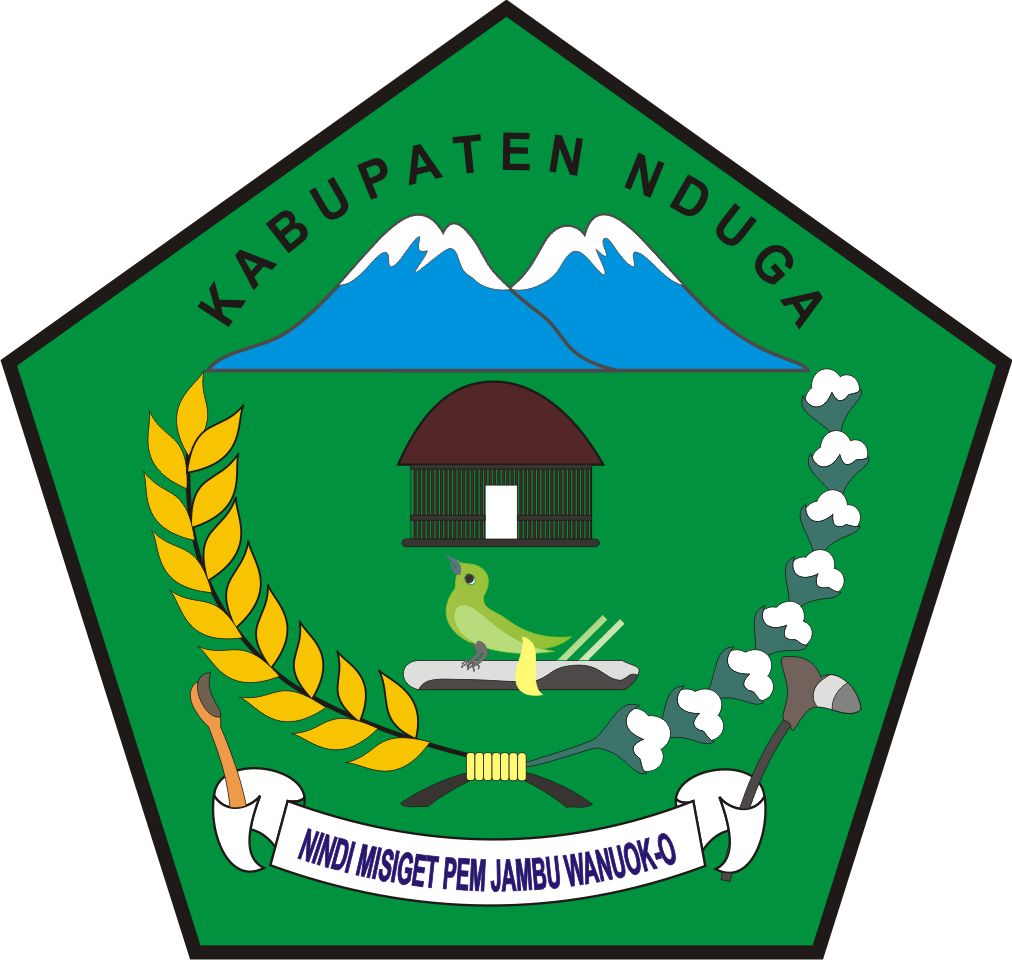
Nduga Regency

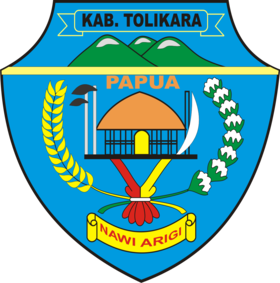
Tolikara Regency

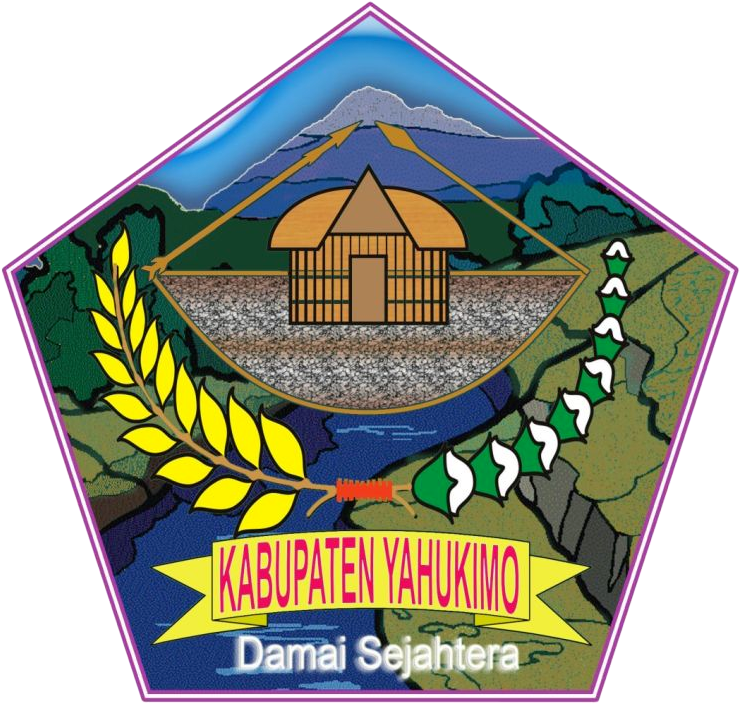
Yahukimo Regency

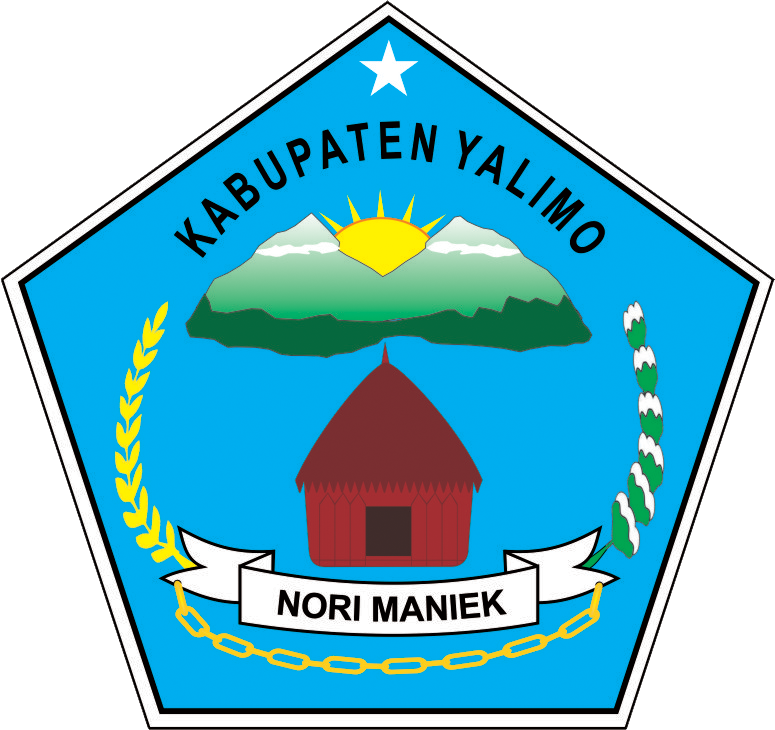
Yalimo Regency

=== Papua ===
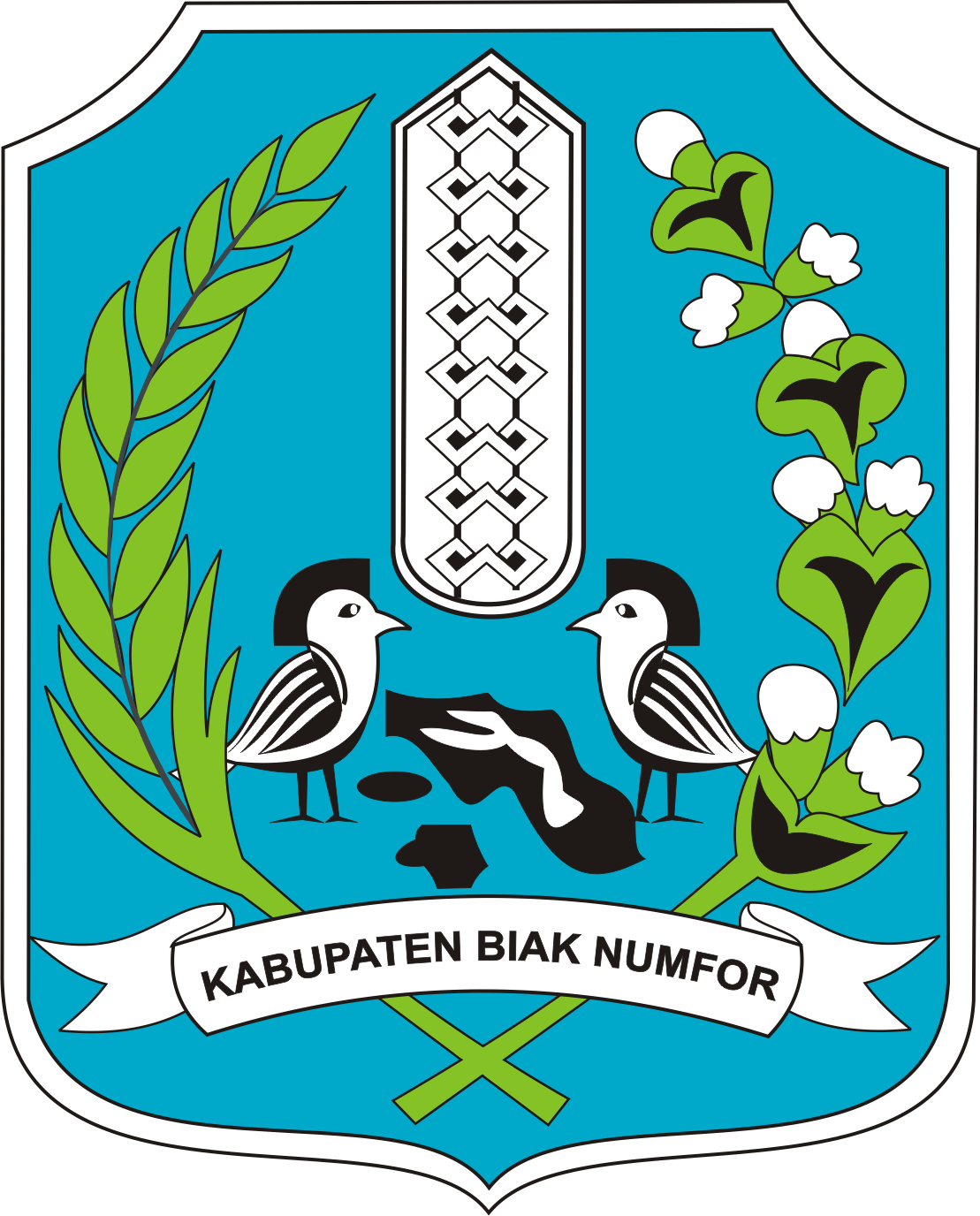
Biak Numfor Regency

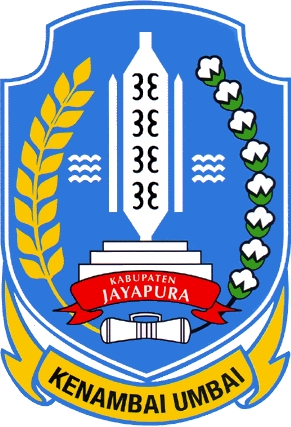
Jayapura Regency

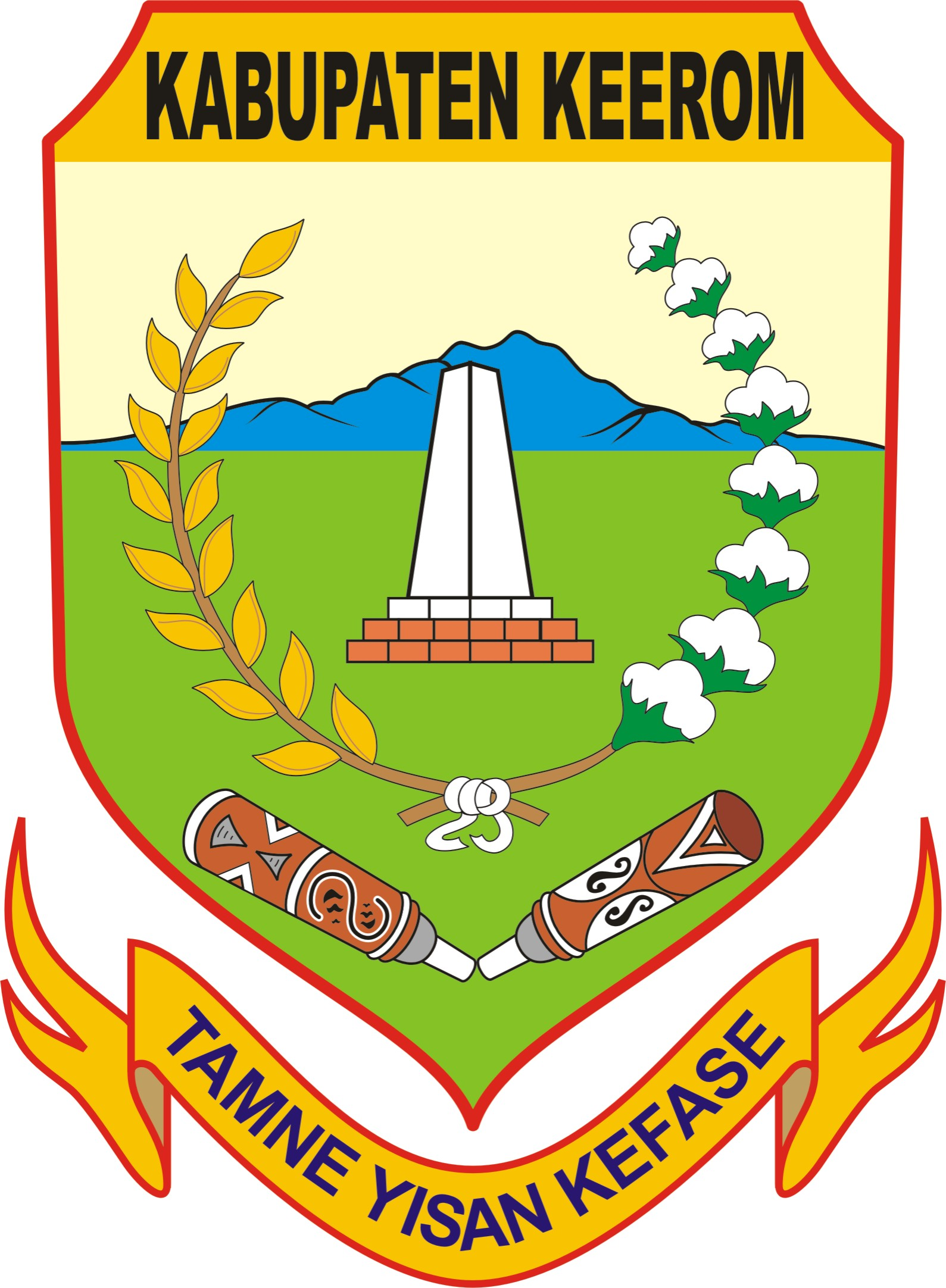
Keerom Regency

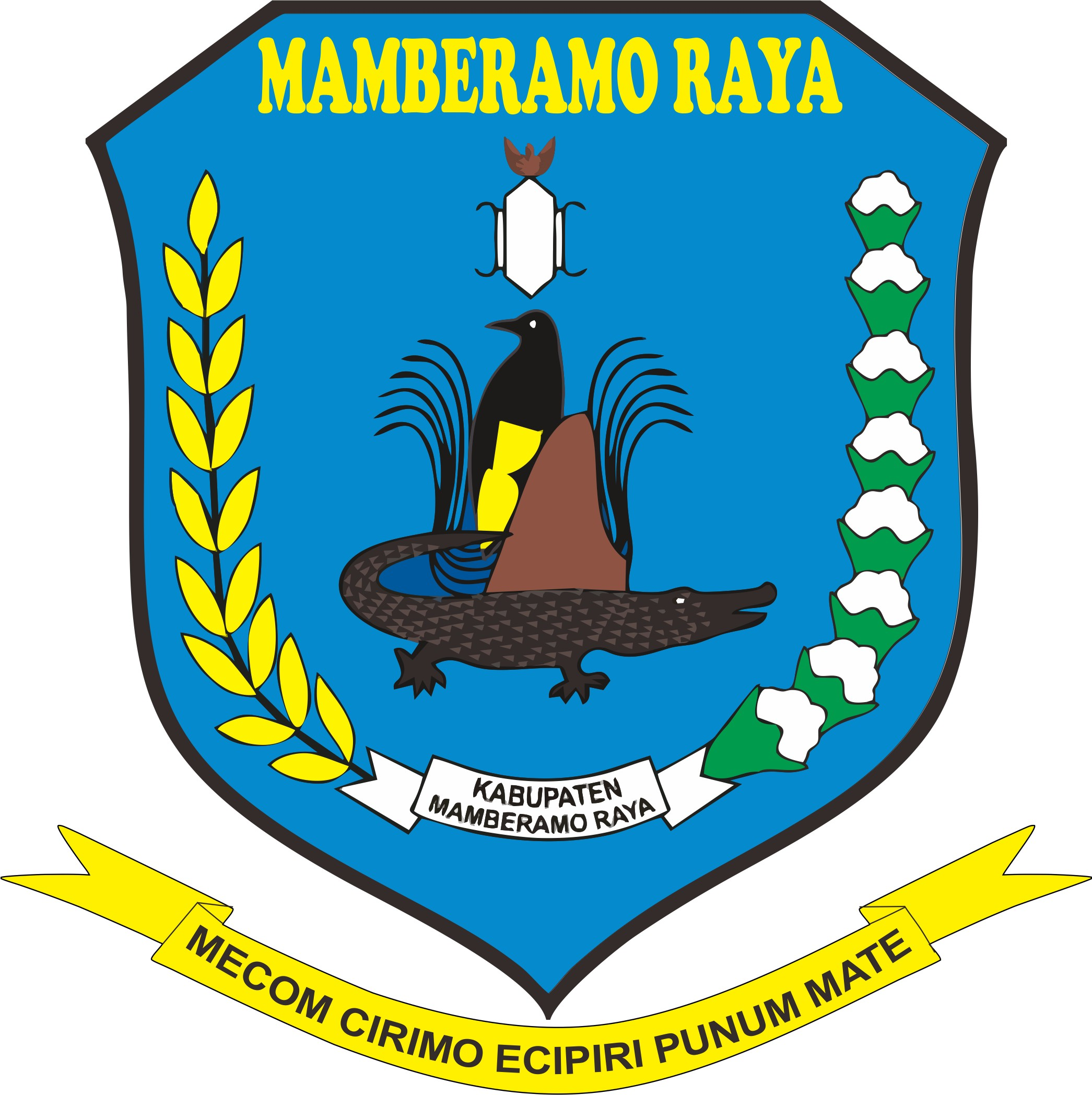
Mamberamo Raya Regency

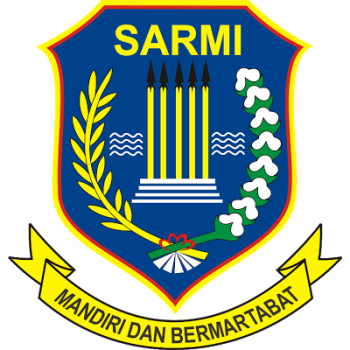
Sarmi Regency

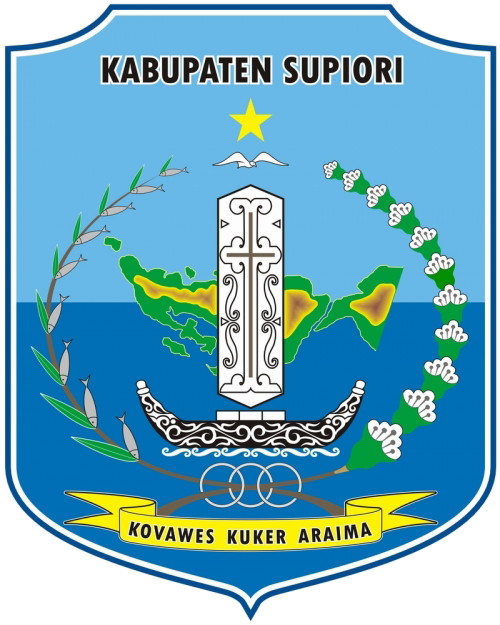
Supiori Regency

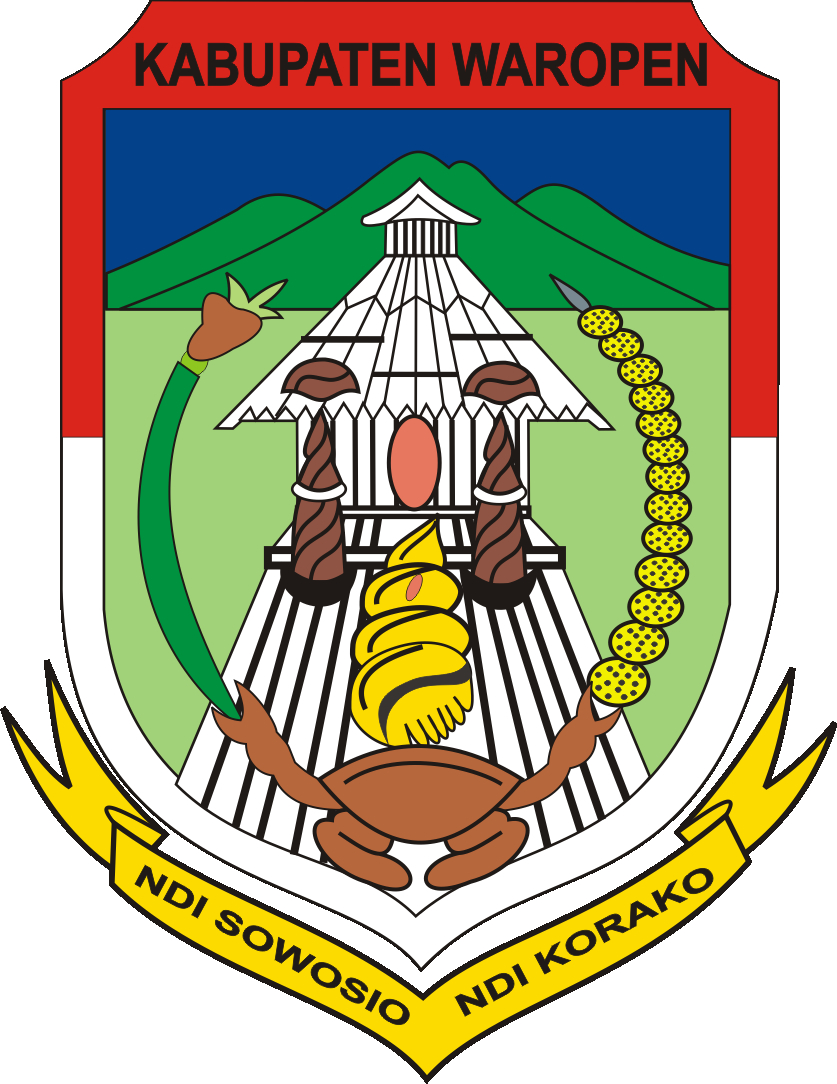
Waropen Regency

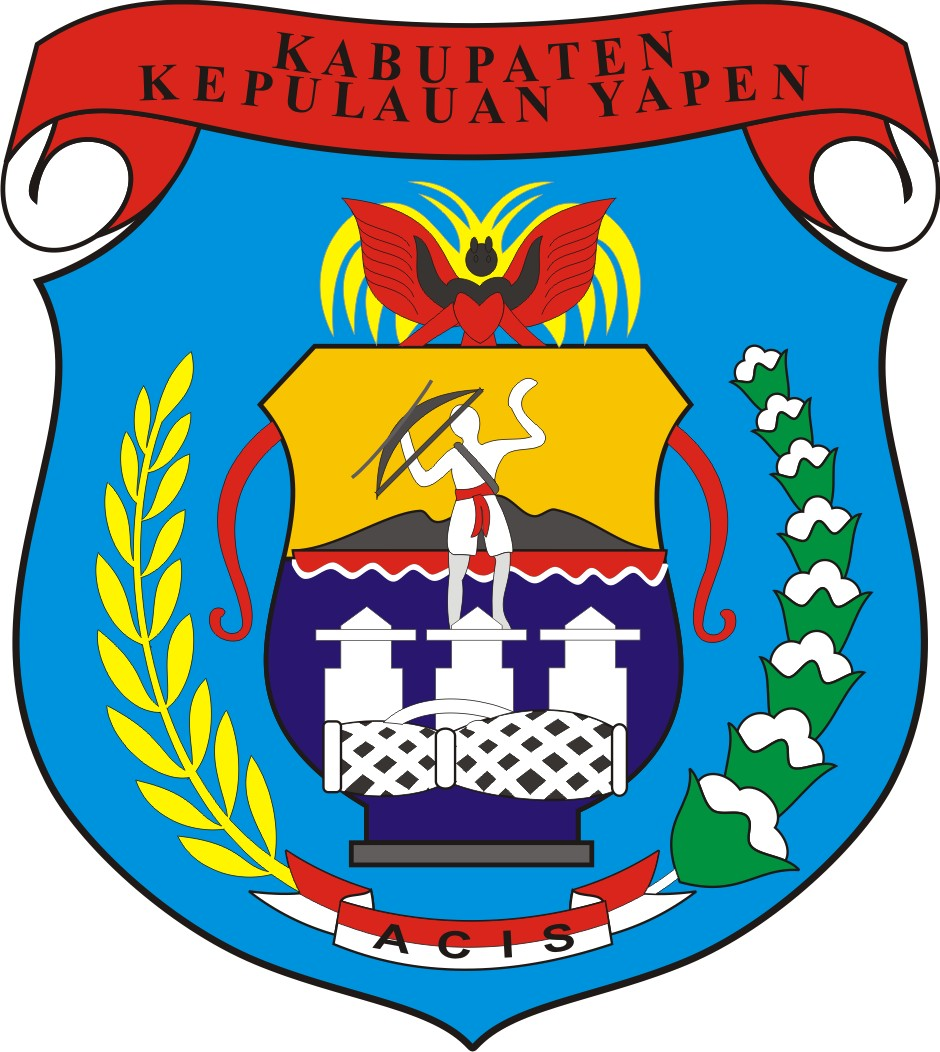
Yapen Islands Regency

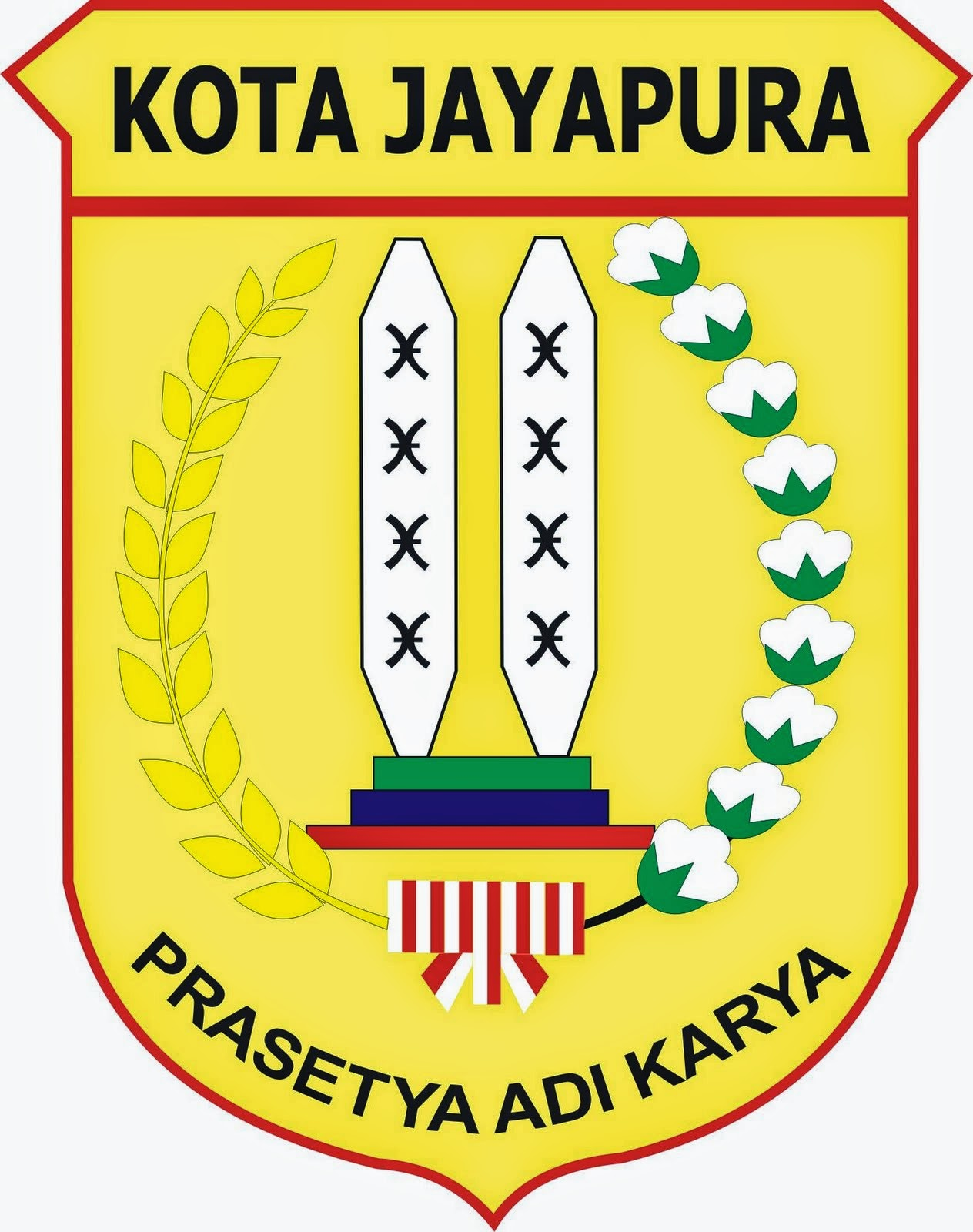
Jayapura City

== Historical ==
=== National ===
Emblem of East Indies (Indonesia) during VOC rule (1602–1799)

Coat of arms of Dutch East Indies (1800–1945)

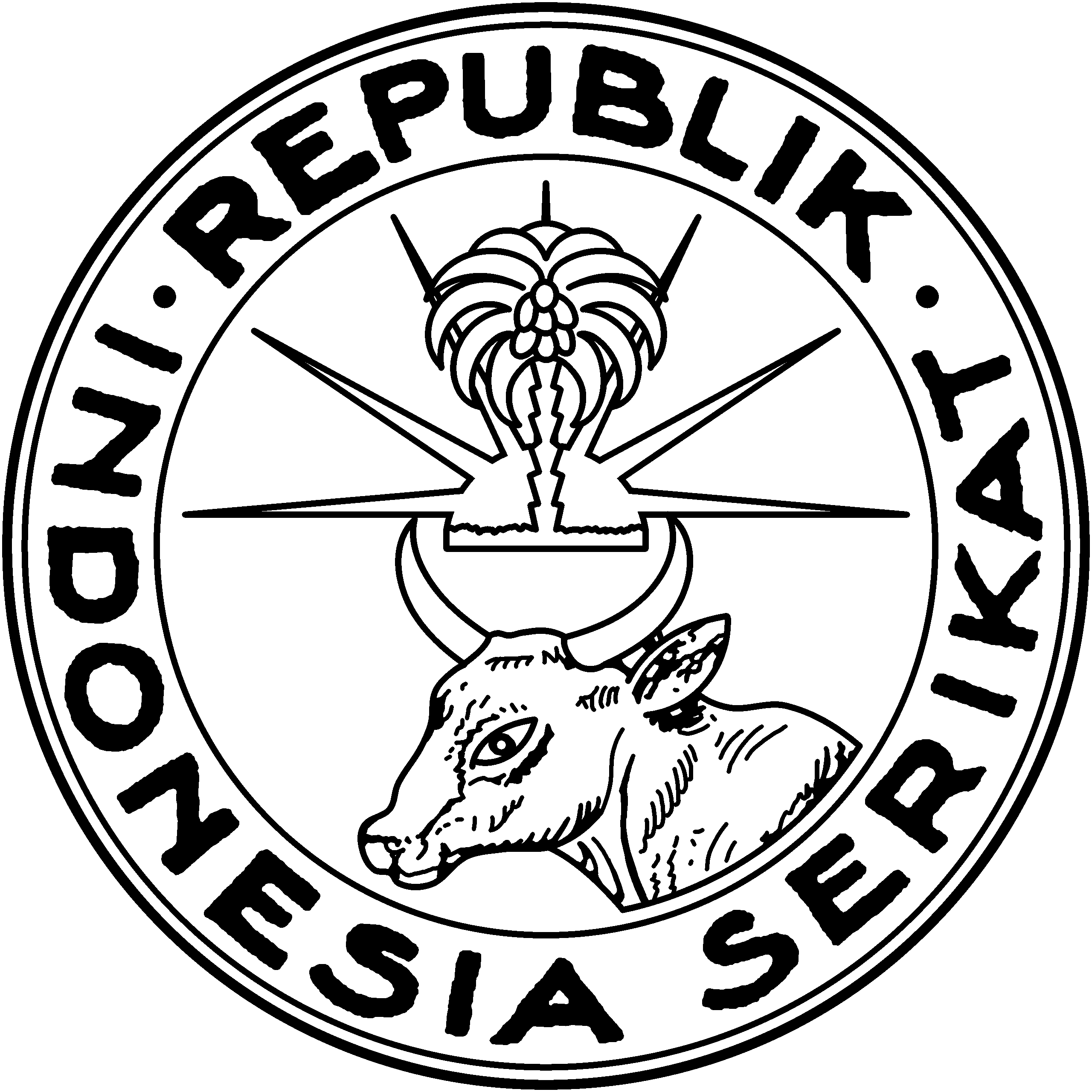
Mohammad Yamin's first proposed seal design for the United States of Indonesia, rejected, deemed too similar to the Rising Sun Flag (1949–1950)

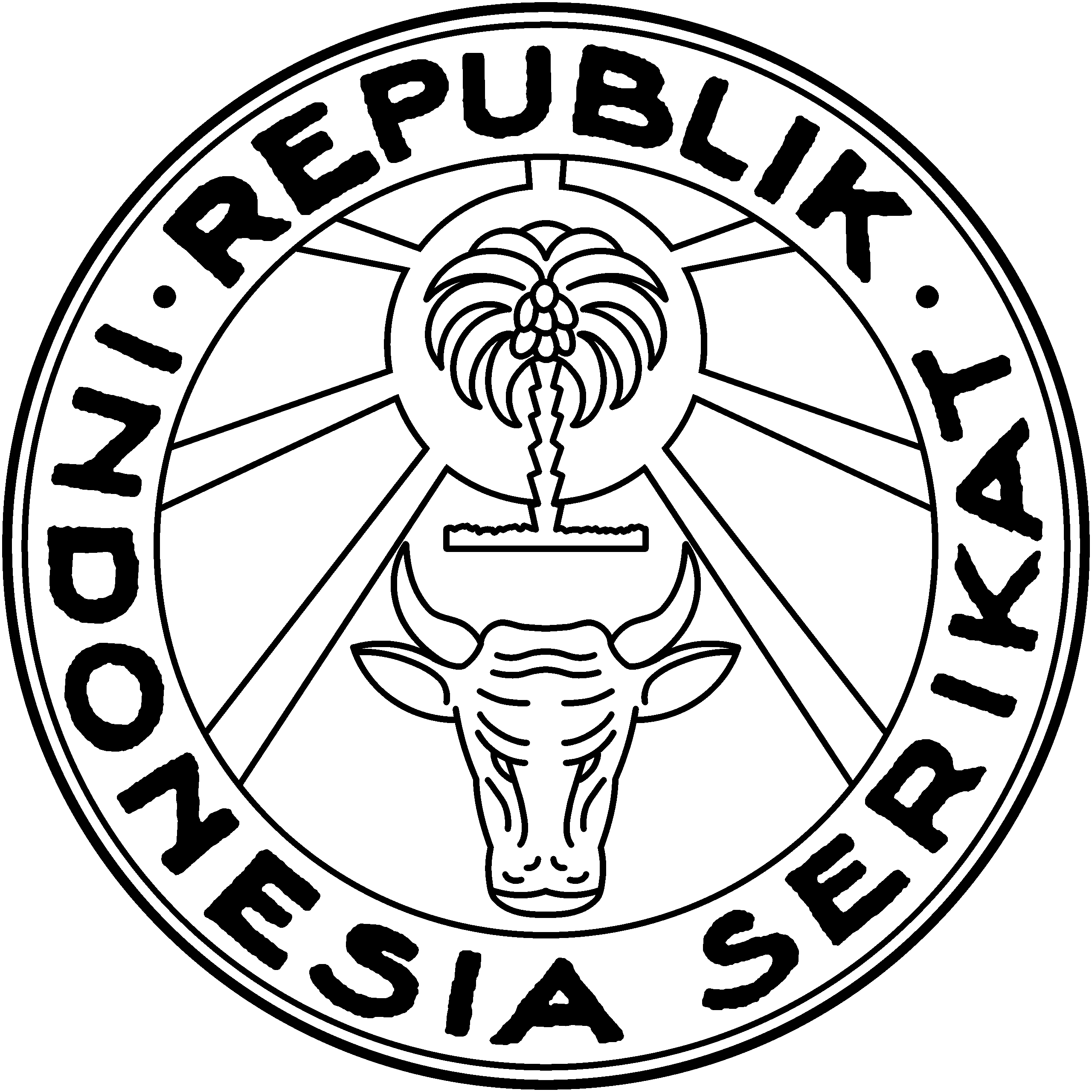
Mohammad Yamin's second proposed seal design for the United States of Indonesia, rejected, deemed too similar to the Rising Sun Flag (1949–1950)

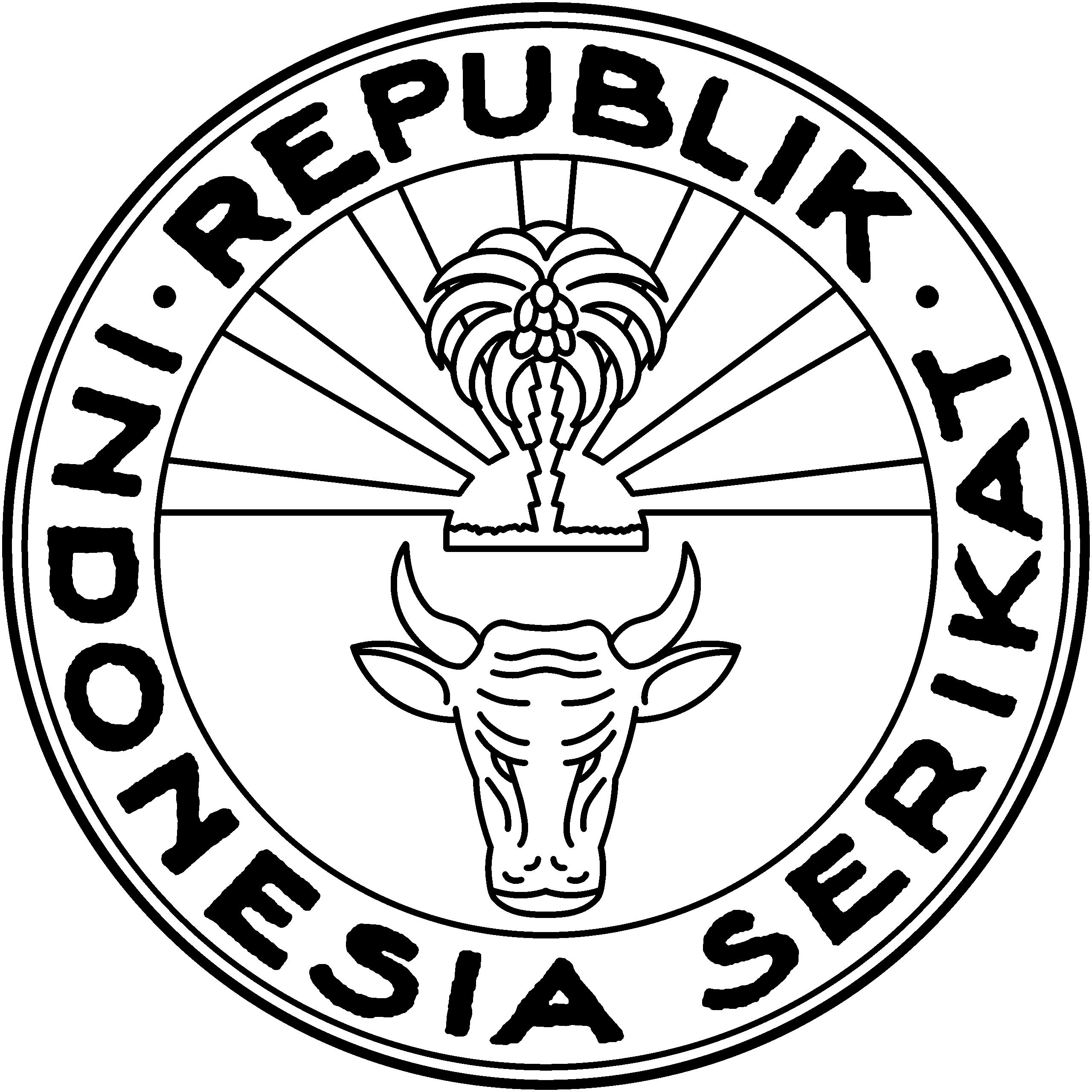
Mohammad Yamin's third proposed seal design for the United States of Indonesia, rejected, deemed too similar to the Rising Sun Flag (1949–1950)

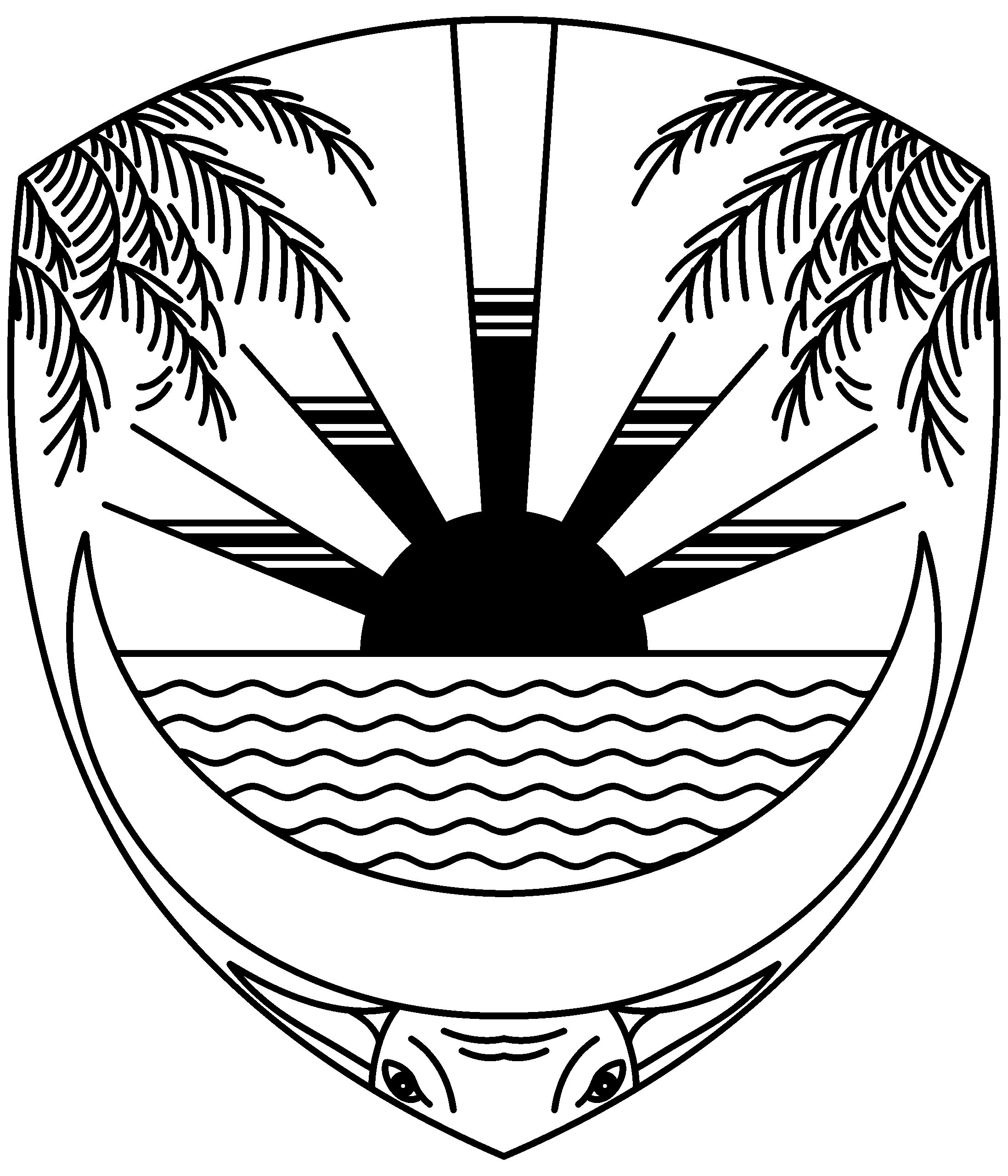
Mohammad Yamin's proposed escutcheon design for the United States of Indonesia, rejected, deemed too similar to the Rising Sun Flag (1949–1950)

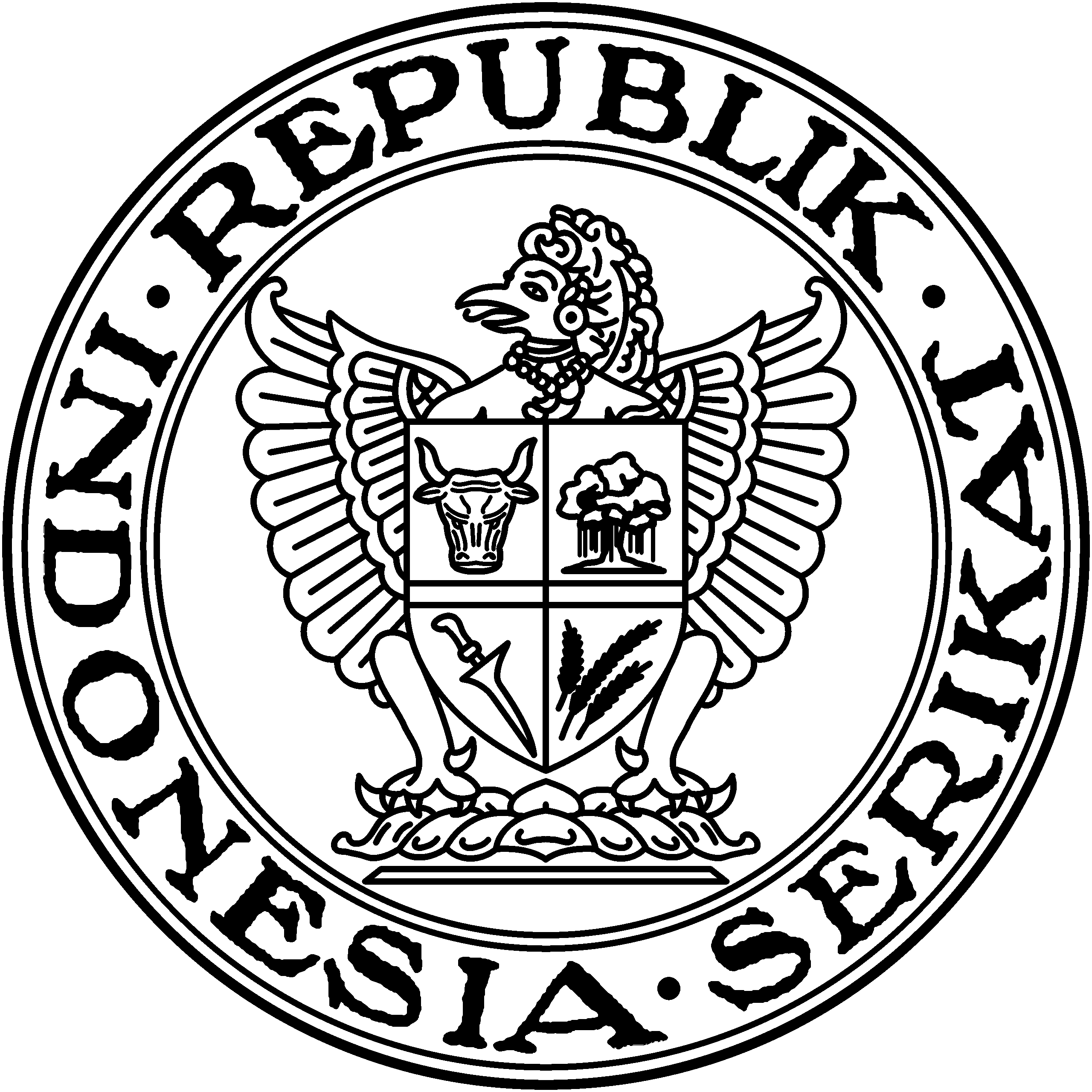
First proposed seal design for the United States of Indonesia (1949–1950)

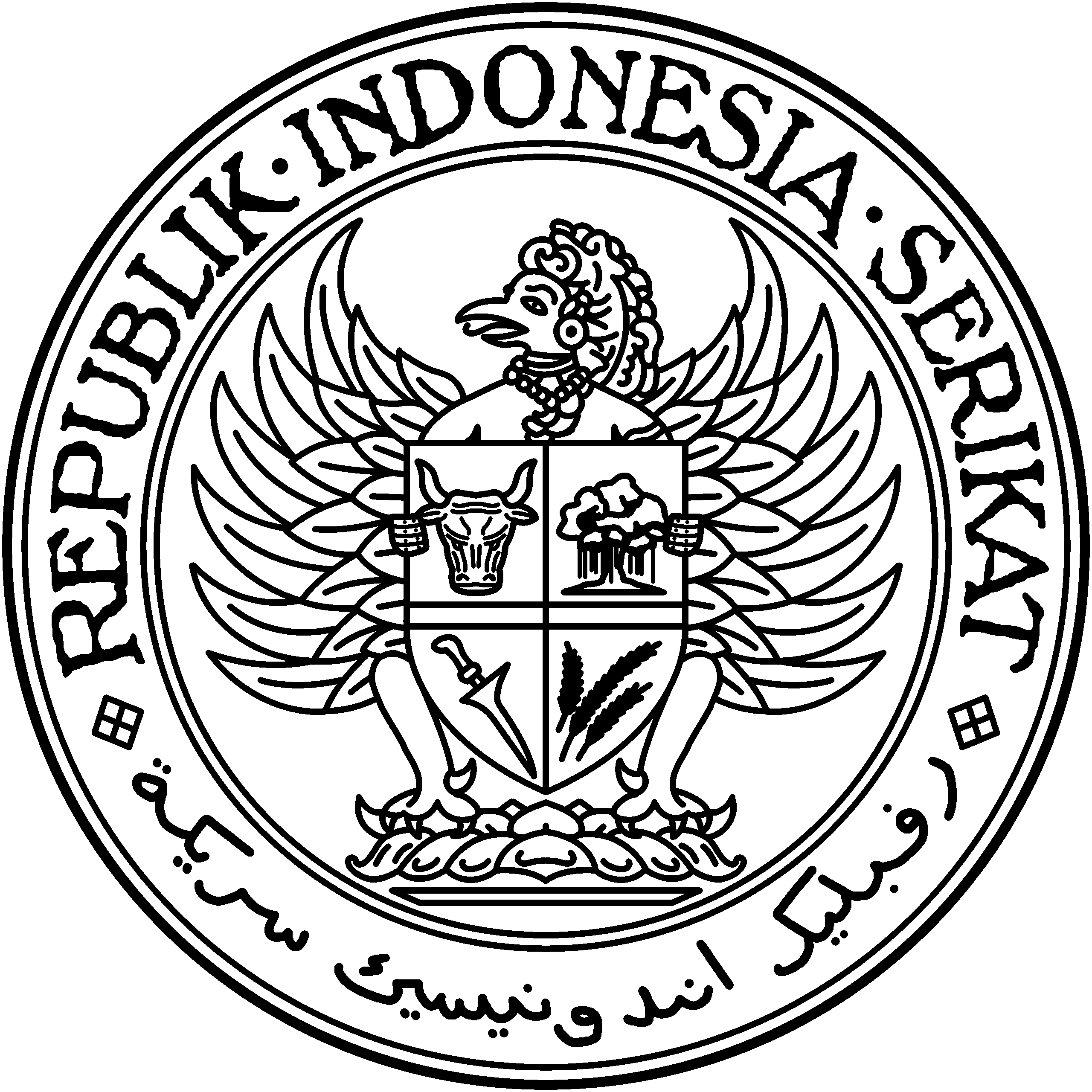
Second proposed seal design for the United States of Indonesia (1949–1950)

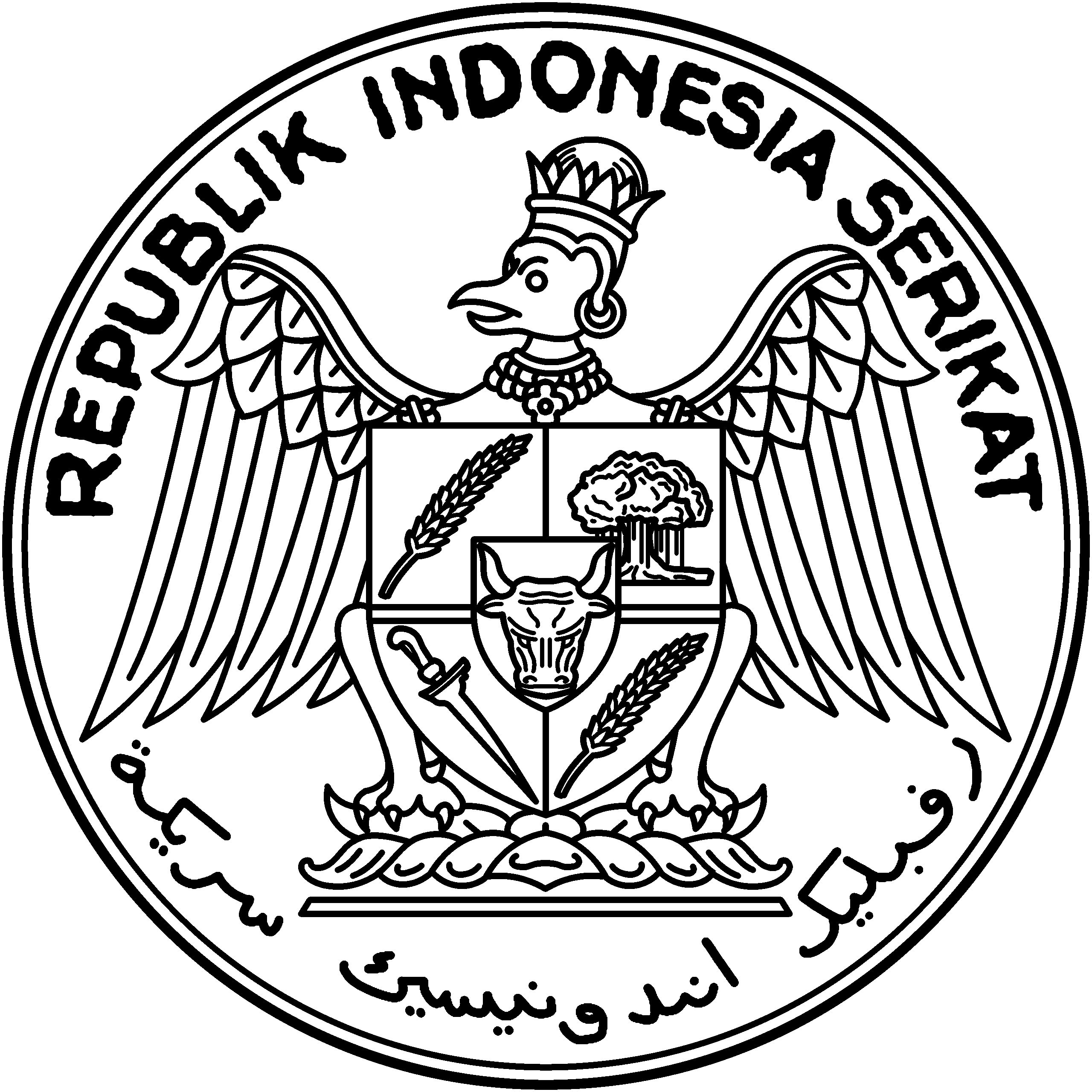
Third proposed seal design for the United States of Indonesia (1949–1950)

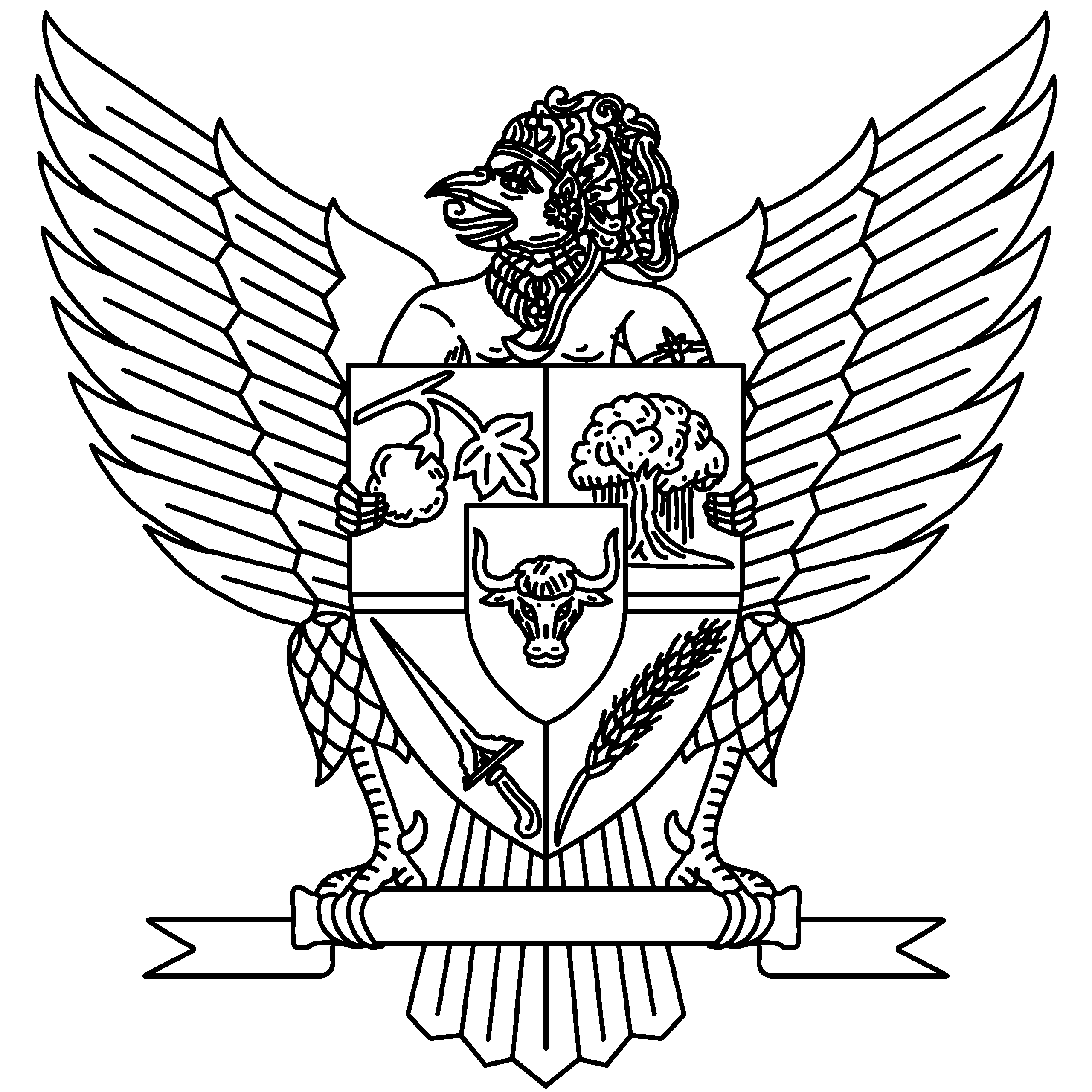
One of the early design of the coat of arms of United States of Indonesia (1949–1950)

Final design of the coat of arms of the United States of Indonesia, deemed too mythical by Masyumi (1949–1950)

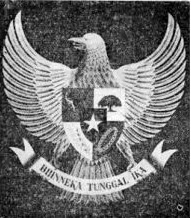
Prototype of the present national coat of arms, deemed to similar to the United States bald eagle (1950)

=== Kingdoms and sultanates ===
The Surya Majapahit, the emblem of the Majapahit Empire (1293–1527). The empire was dissolved in 1527 after being defeated by the Demak Sultanate.

Coat of arms of Yogyakarta Sultanate (since 1755), the only monarchy with political power in Indonesia.

Emblem of Surakarta Sunanate (since 1745). Its political power was taken by the government in 1946 and the territory merged into Central Java. But it still exists as a protector of Javanese culture

Coat of arms of the Pakualaman, a monarchy within the greater Yogyakarta Sultanate

Coat of arms of the Riau-Lingga Sultanate (1824-1911). The sultanate was occupied, then abolished by the Dutch in 1911 and its territory were directly annexed into the Dutch East Indies.

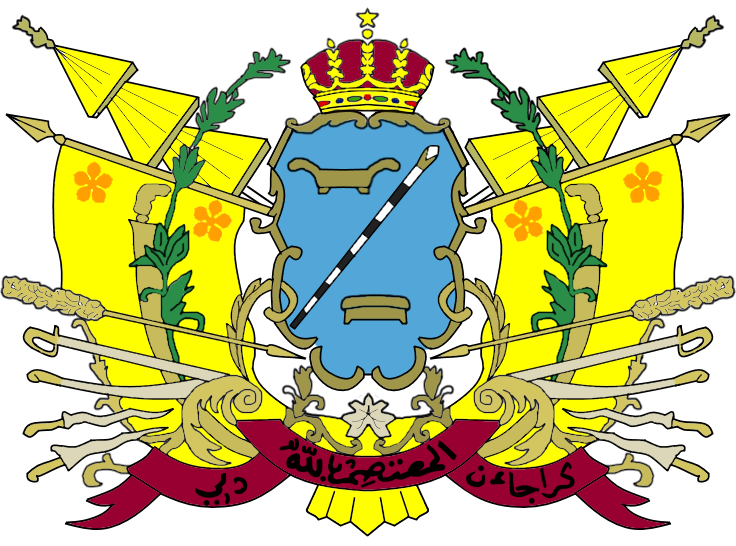
Coat of arms of the Deli Sultanate (1632-1946). Its political power was taken by the government in 1946 and the territory merged into North Sumatra.

Coat of arms of the Pontianak Sultanate (1771-1950). Its political power was taken by the government in 1959 and the territory merged into West Kalimantan.

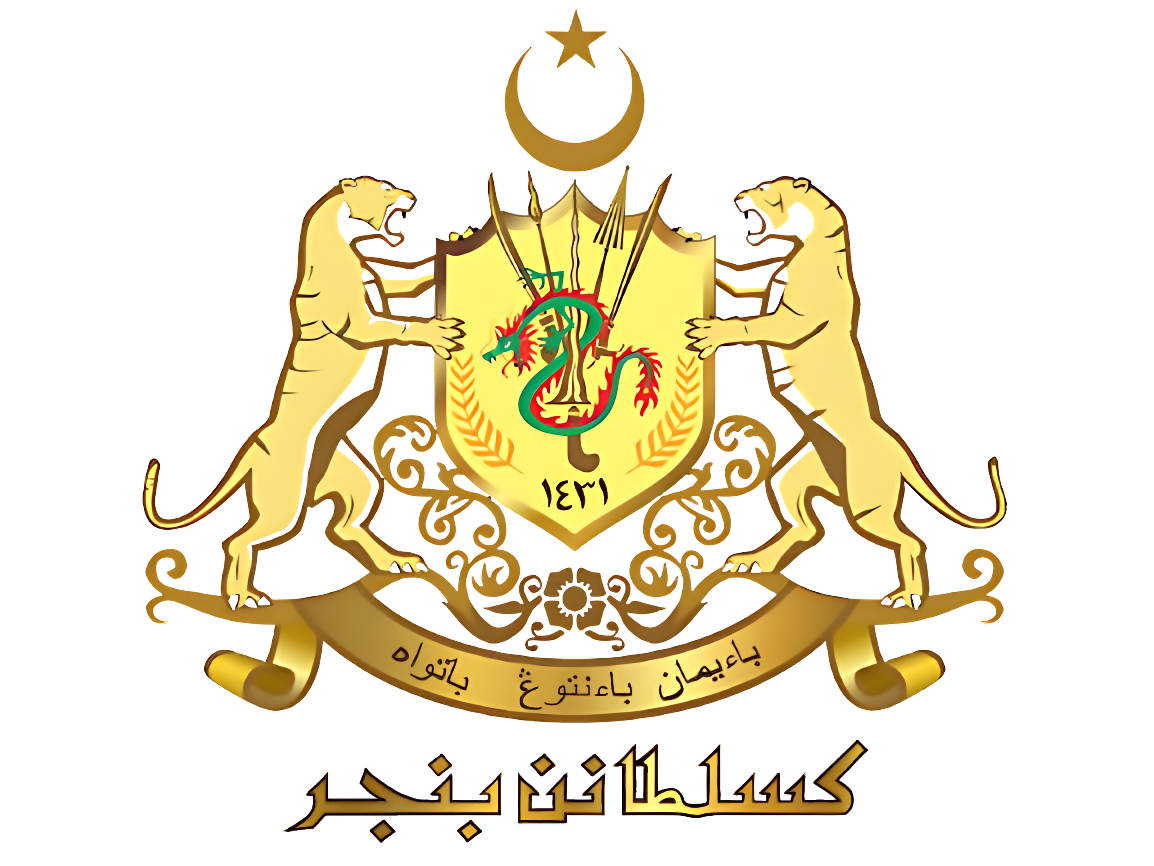
Coat of arms of the Banjar Sultanate (1526–1905), this is the coat since the restoration in 2010. However, it is believed that this coat was inspired by the previous coat.

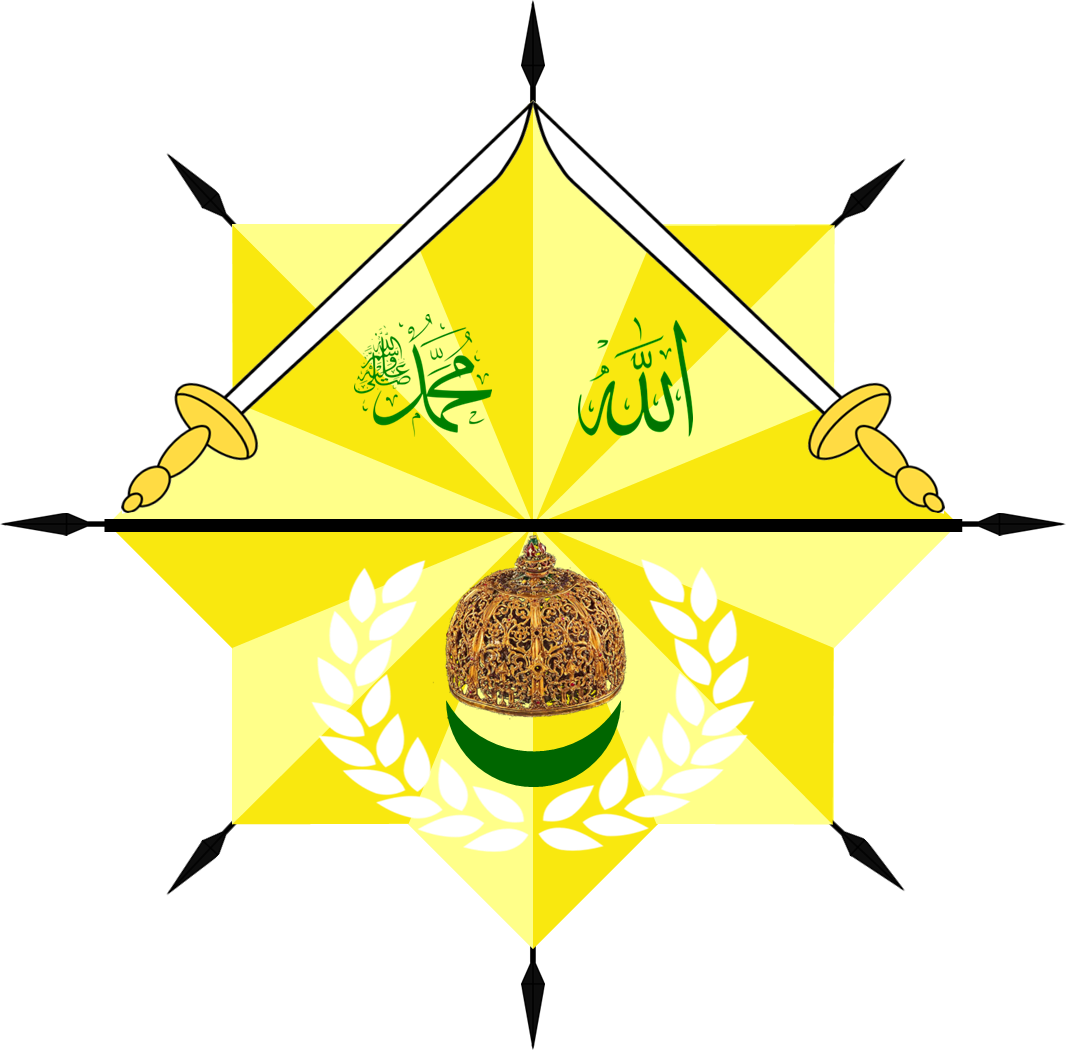
Emblem of the Banten Sultanate (1527–1813). The sultanate was defeated and abolished by the Dutch authority in 1813 while its remaining territory was annexed into the Dutch East Indies.

Royal seal of Sultan Tangkal Alam of the Pagaruyung Kingdom (1347–1833). The kingdom was defeated and abolished by the Dutch in 1833 after the Padri War while its remaining territory was annexed into the Dutch East Indies.

Emblem of the Lanfang Republic (1777–1884), a tributary state of the Qing Dynasty established in West Kalimantan, which was then occupied and dissolved by the Dutch in 1884.

=== Subdivisions ===
==== States ====
Coat of arms of the former State of East Indonesia (1946–1950).

Coat of arms of the former State of East Indonesia (1946–1950) with escutcheon.

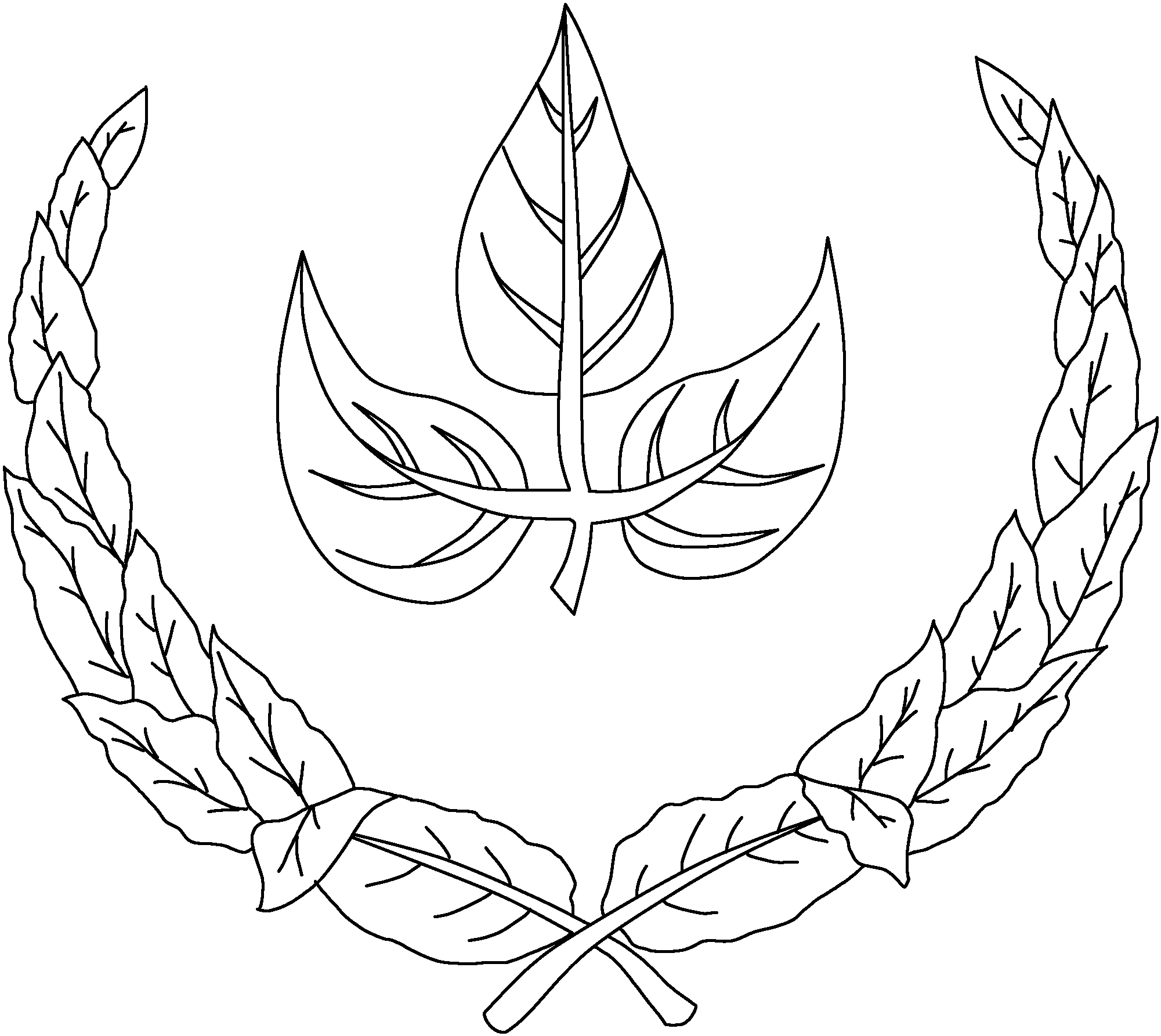
Coat of arms of the former State of East Sumatra (1947–1950)

Coat of arms of the former State of Pasundan (1948–1950).

==== Provinces ====
Emblem of the former province of East Timor (1976–1999), now the independent state of East Timor.

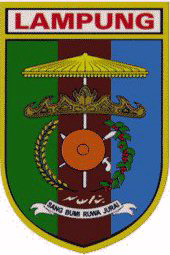
Former emblem of Lampung (1971–2009).

Emblem of the former Municipality of Greater Jakarta (1951–1960) and the first emblem of Special Capital Region of Jakarta (1960–1963).

Former emblem of Special Capital Region of Jakarta (1963–1964). The motto was written in Republican Spelling System, which in current version was replaced by the Indonesian Spelling System from 1964 onwards.

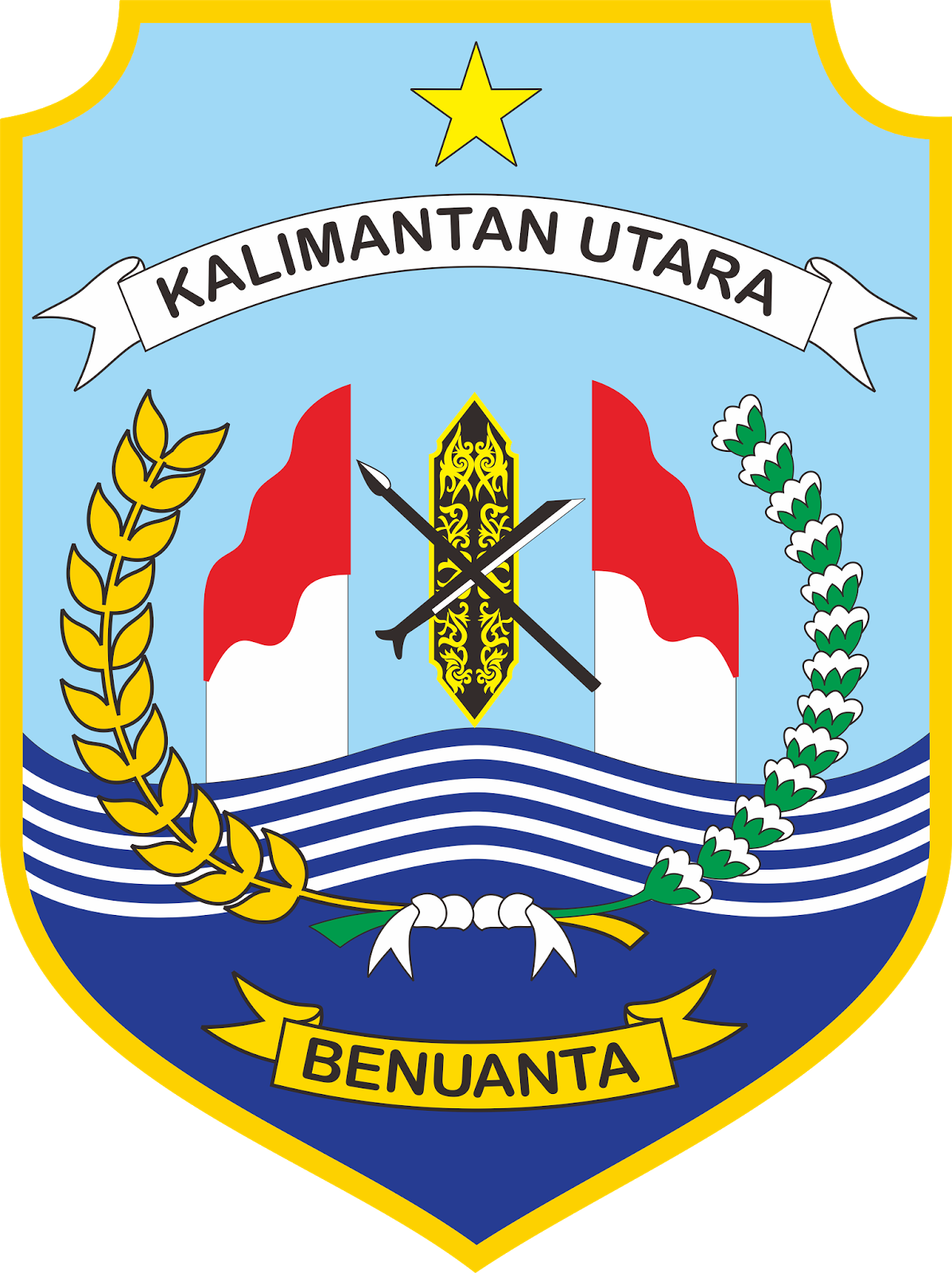
Former emblem of North Kalimantan (2014–2021) as per North Kalimantan Governor Regulation No. 4/2014.

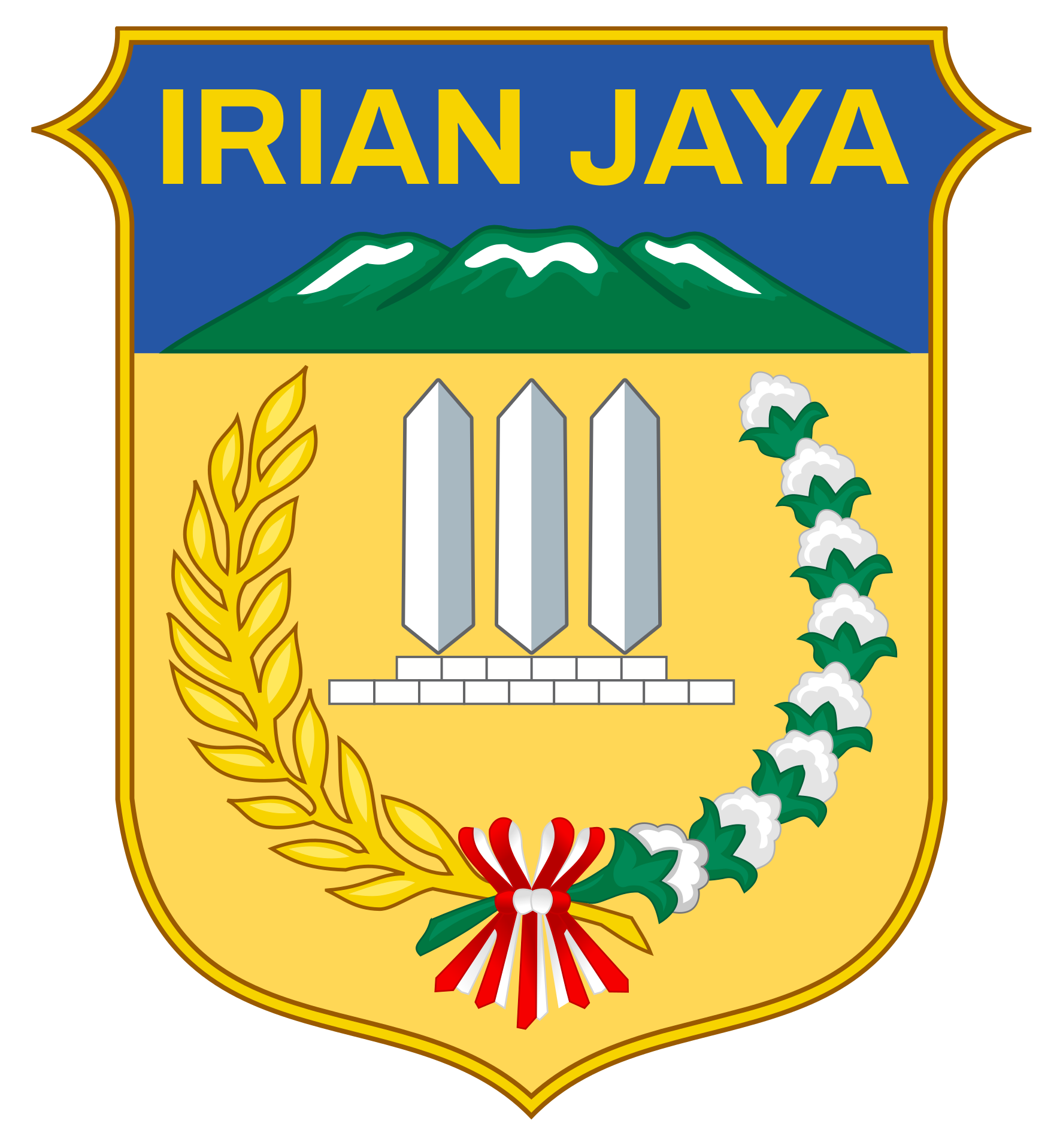
Former emblem of the then Irian Jaya (1963–2002), now Papua.

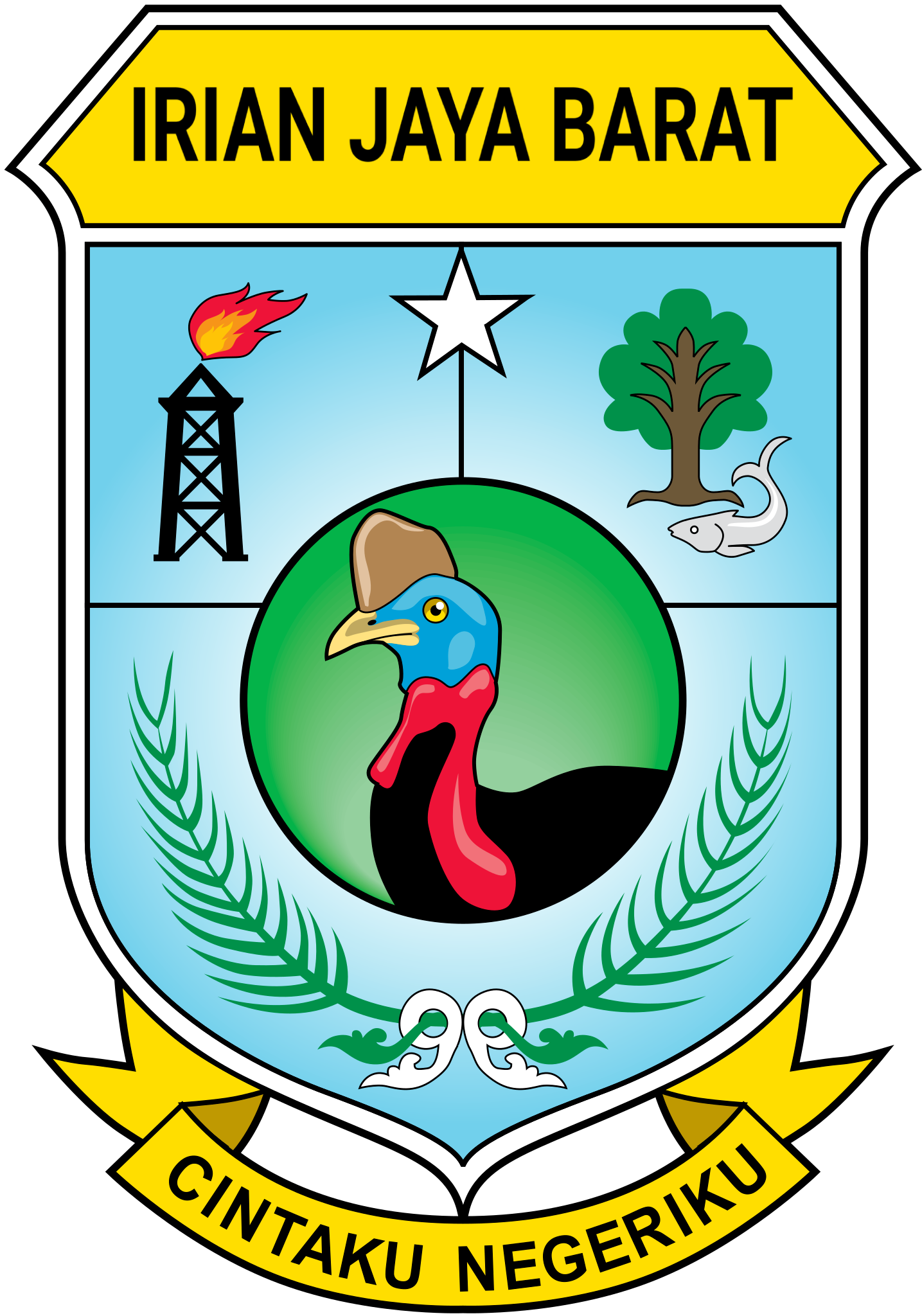
Former emblem of the then West Irian Jaya (1999–2007), now West Papua.

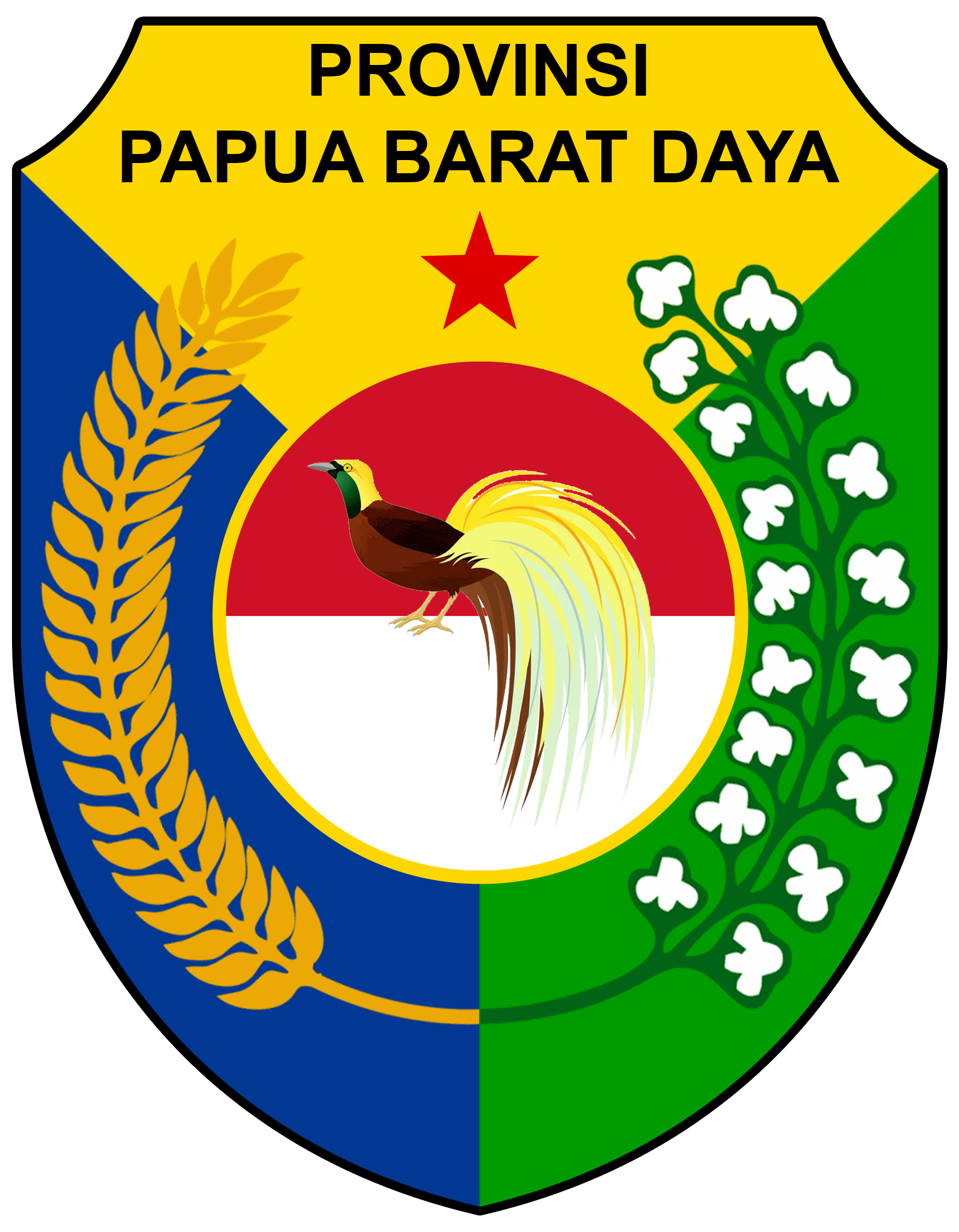
Emblem of Southwest Papua Presidium, organization that supported the new province creation.

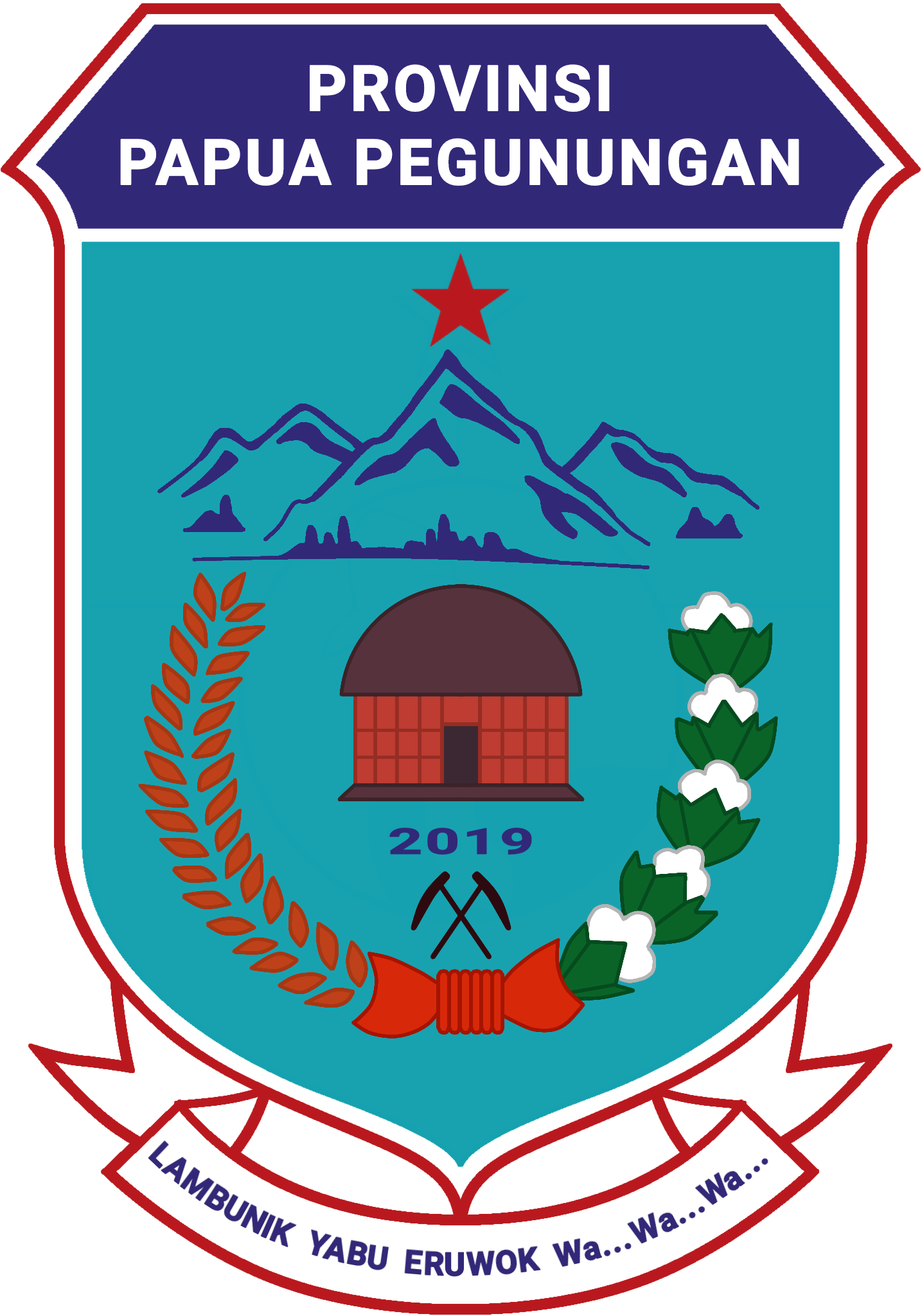
Emblem of Highland Papua Secretariat, organization that supported the new province creation.

==== Colonial era ====
Coat of Arms of Ambon during Dutch colonization.

Coat of Arms of Bandung during Dutch colonization.

Coat of Arms of Batavia during Dutch colonization, now called Jakarta.

Coat of Arms of Buitenzorg during Dutch colonization, now called Bogor.

Coat of Arms of Tjiandjoer during Dutch colonization, now called Cianjur.

Coat of Arms of Cheribon during Dutch colonization, now called Cirebon.

Coat of Arms of Garut during Dutch colonization.

Coat of Arms of Magelang during Dutch colonization.

Coat of Arms of Makassar during Dutch colonization.

Coat of Arms of Malang during Dutch colonization.

Coat of Arms of Manado during Dutch colonization.

Coat of Arms of Medan during Dutch colonization.

Coat of Arms of Oosthaven during Dutch colonization, now called Bandar Lampung.

Coat of Arms of Padang during Dutch colonization.

Coat of Arms of Palembang during Dutch colonization.

Coat of Arms of Pekalongan during Dutch colonization.

Coat of Arms of Semarang during Dutch colonization.

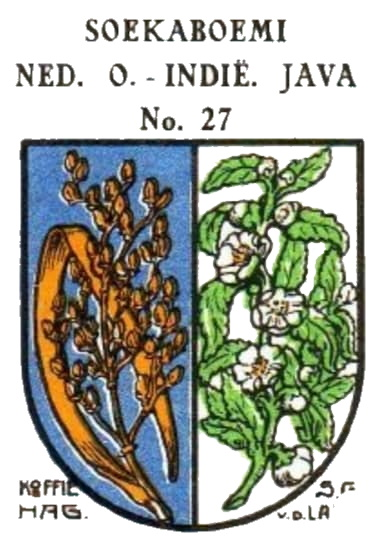
Coat of Arms of Sukabumi during Dutch colonization.

Coat of Arms of Surabaya during Dutch colonization.

Coat of Arms of Madiun during Dutch colonization.

Coat of Arms of Pontianak during Dutch colonization.

==== Cities and regencies ====
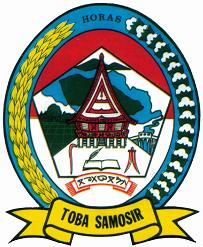
Former emblem of Toba Samosir Regency. The regency was renamed into Toba Regency as of 2020 which affects the use of the former Emblem.

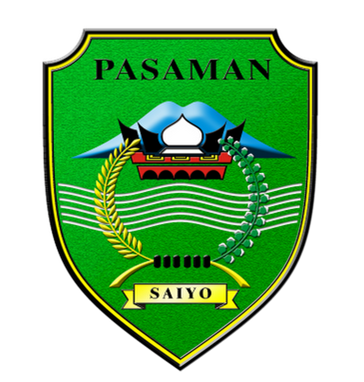
Former emblem of Pasaman Regency (1981–2012). With the creation of new West Pasaman Regency from its territory this logo was deemed not reflecting the current reality and replaced.

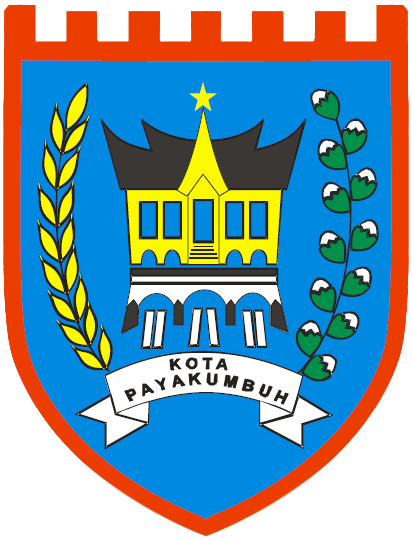
Former emblem of Payakumbuh City (1972–2012). With the addition of more nagaris into its territory, this logo was deemed not reflecting the current reality and replaced.

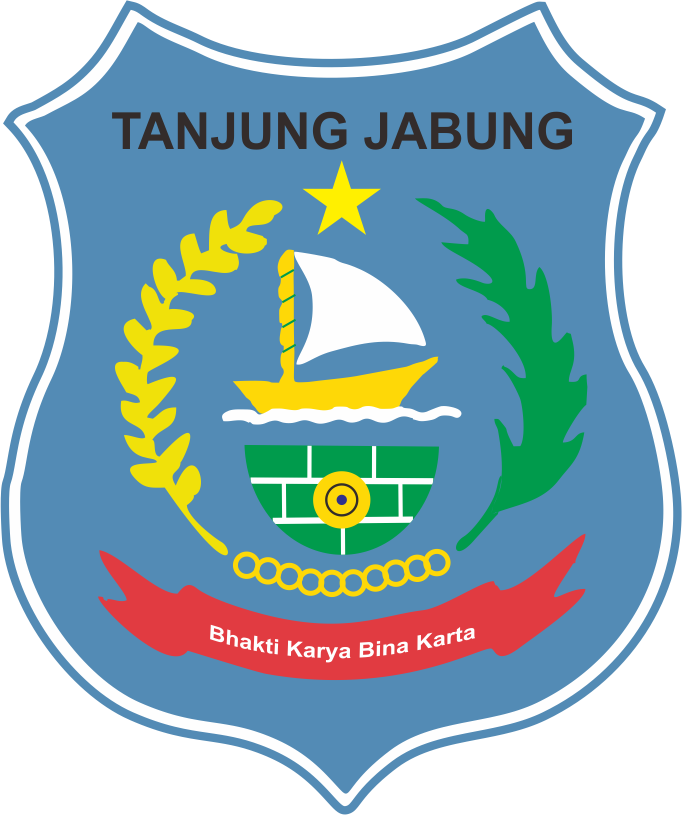
Emblem of former Tanjung Jabung Regency, now split into West Tanjung Jabung Regency and East Tanjung Jabung Regency since 1999.

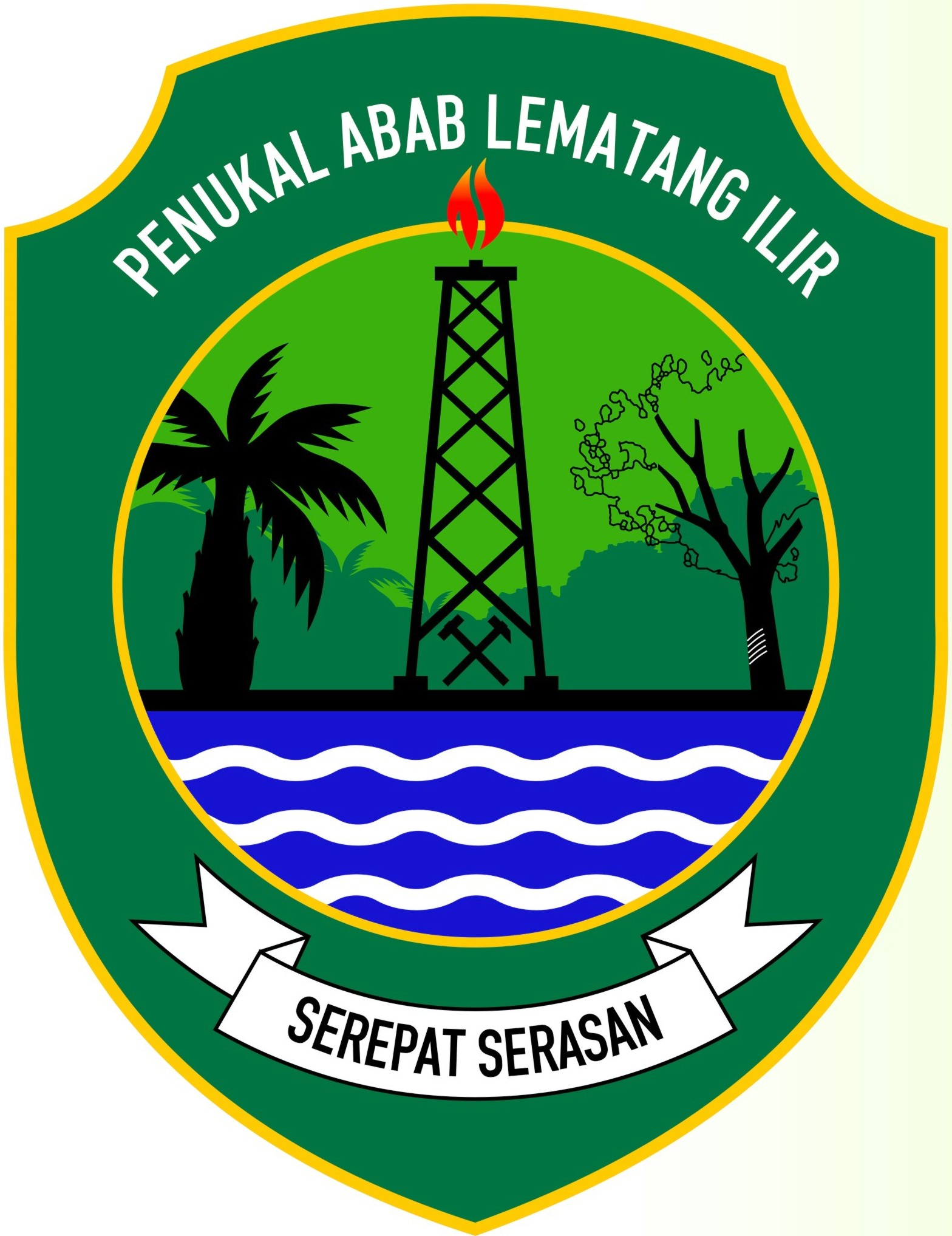
Former logo of Penukal Abab Lematang Ilir Regency (2012–2016), rice and cotton not yet added.

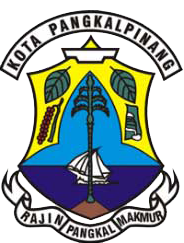
Former emblem of Pangkal Pinang City

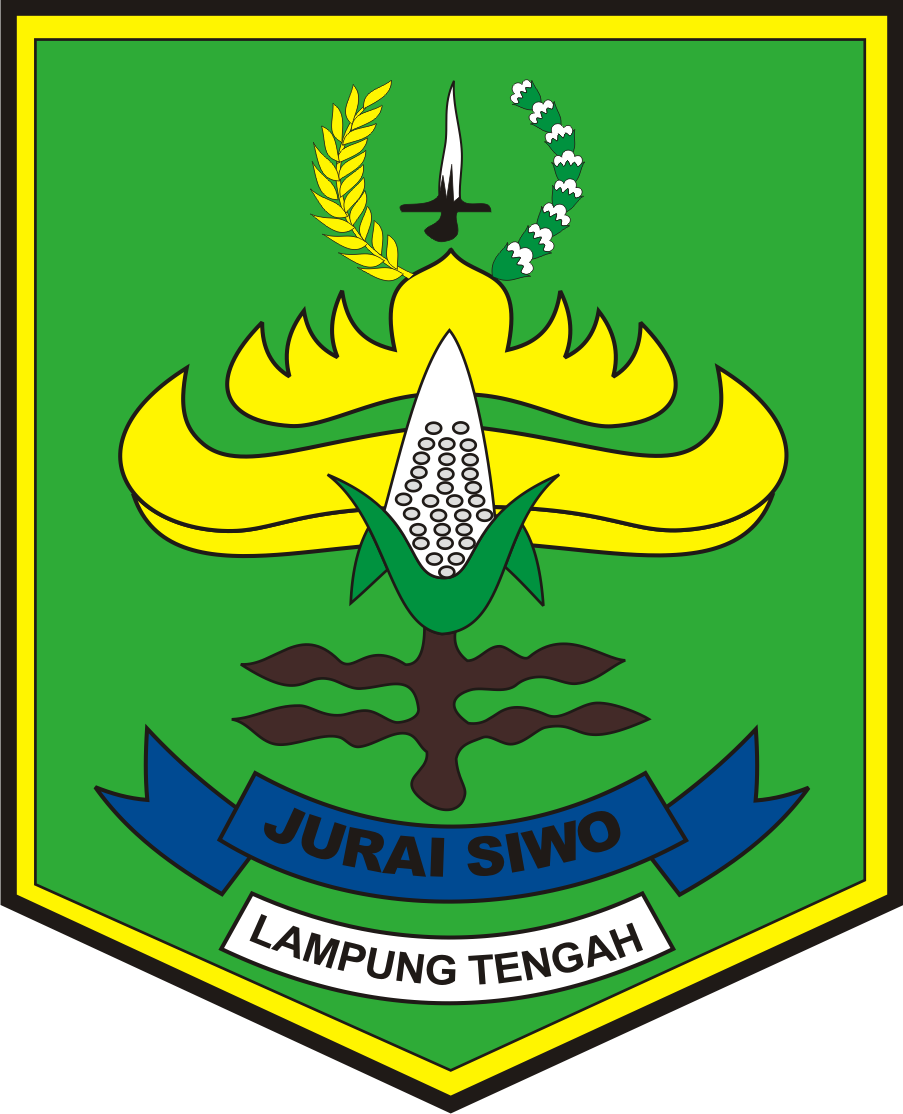
Former emblem of Central Lampung Regency

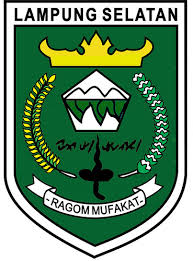
Former emblem of South Lampung Regency (1981–2011), this logo was deemed not reflecting the current reality and replaced in 2011.

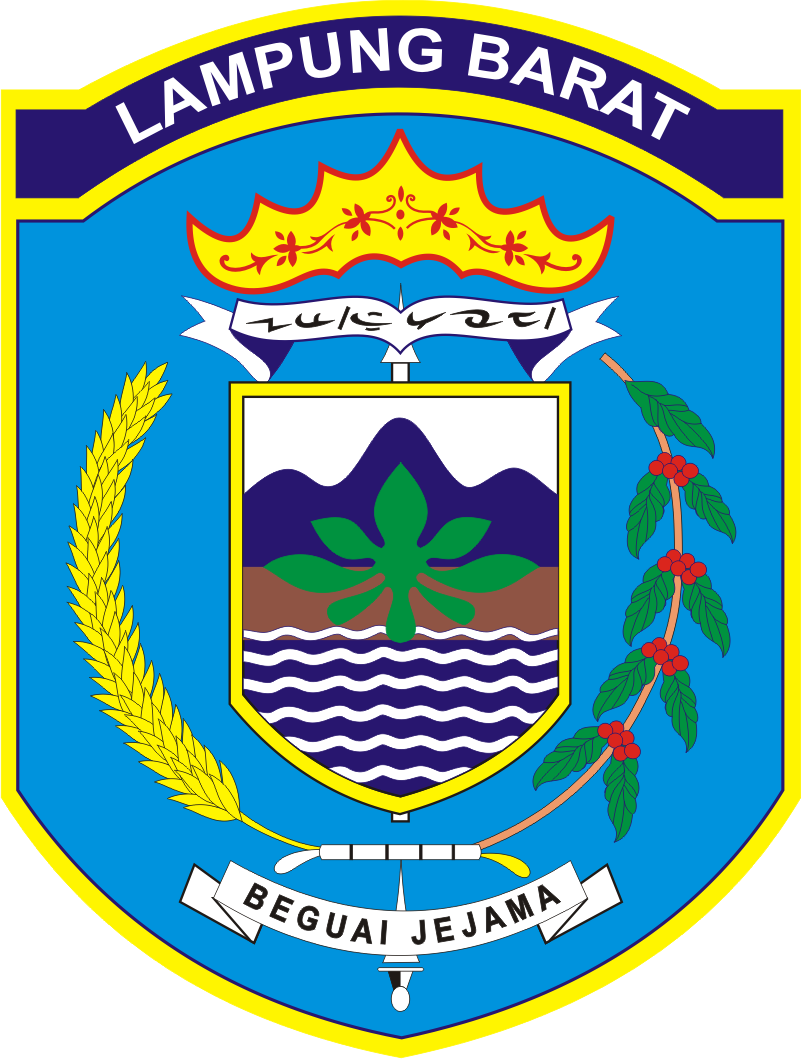
Former emblem of West Lampung Regency, with the creation of Pesisir Barat Regency from its territory, this logo was deemed not reflecting the current reality and replaced in 2015.

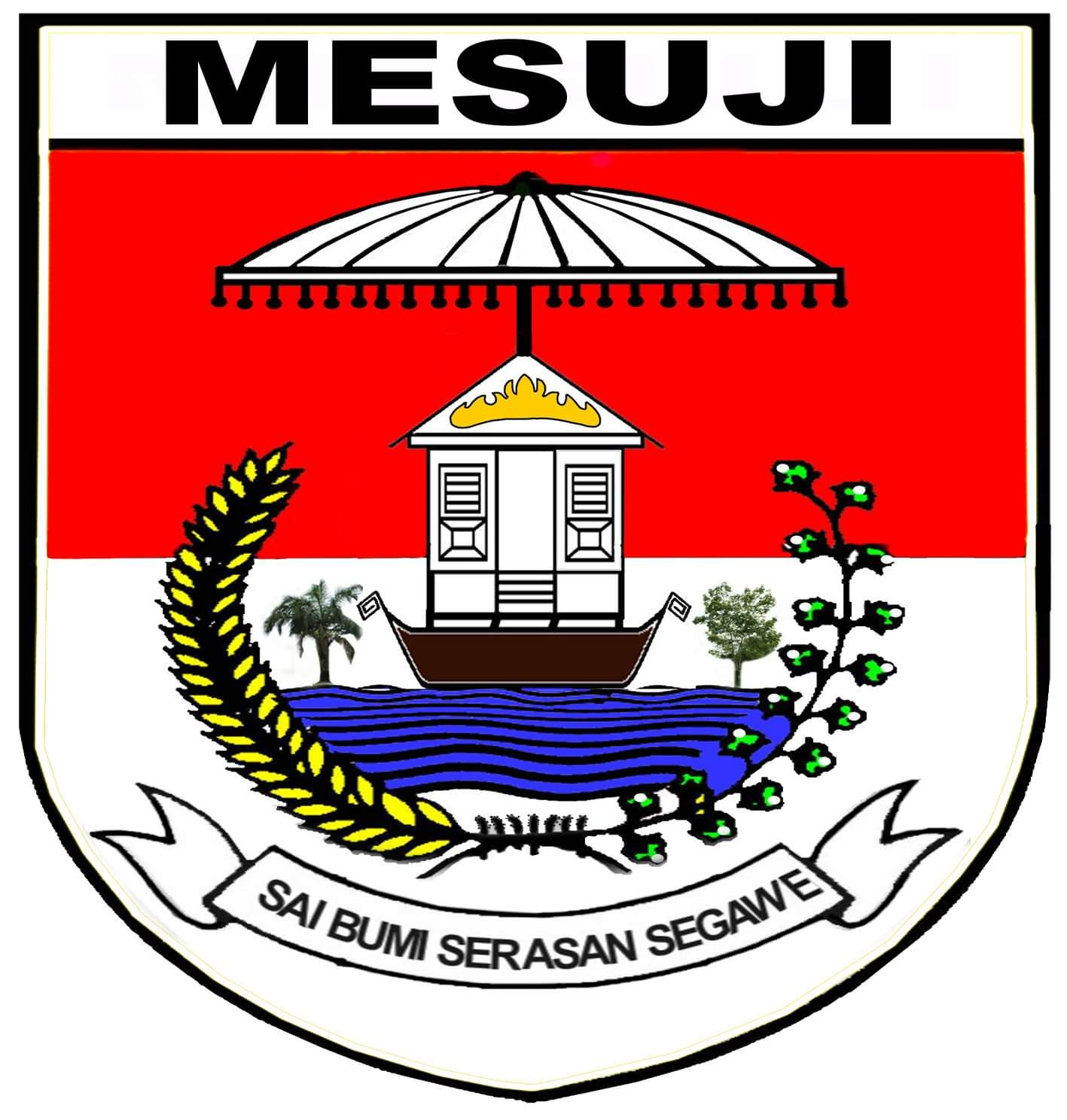
Former emblem of Mesuji Regency (2011–2017).

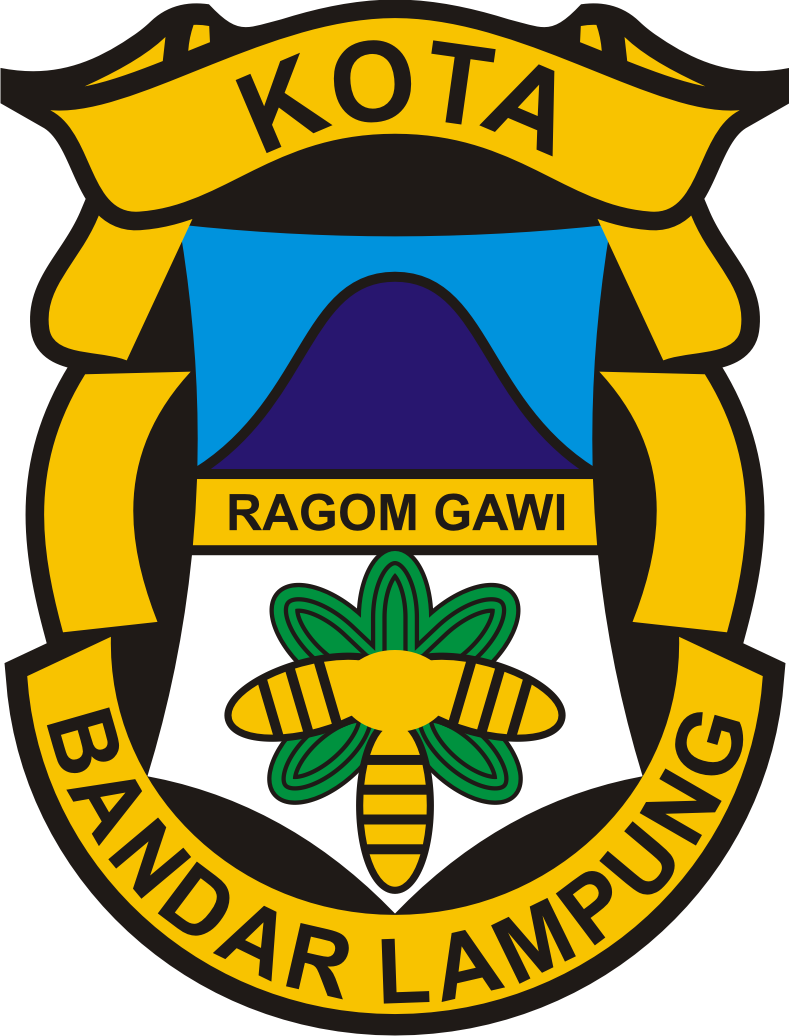
Former emblem of Bandar Lampung

Former emblem of Banjarnegara Regency (1967–2022)

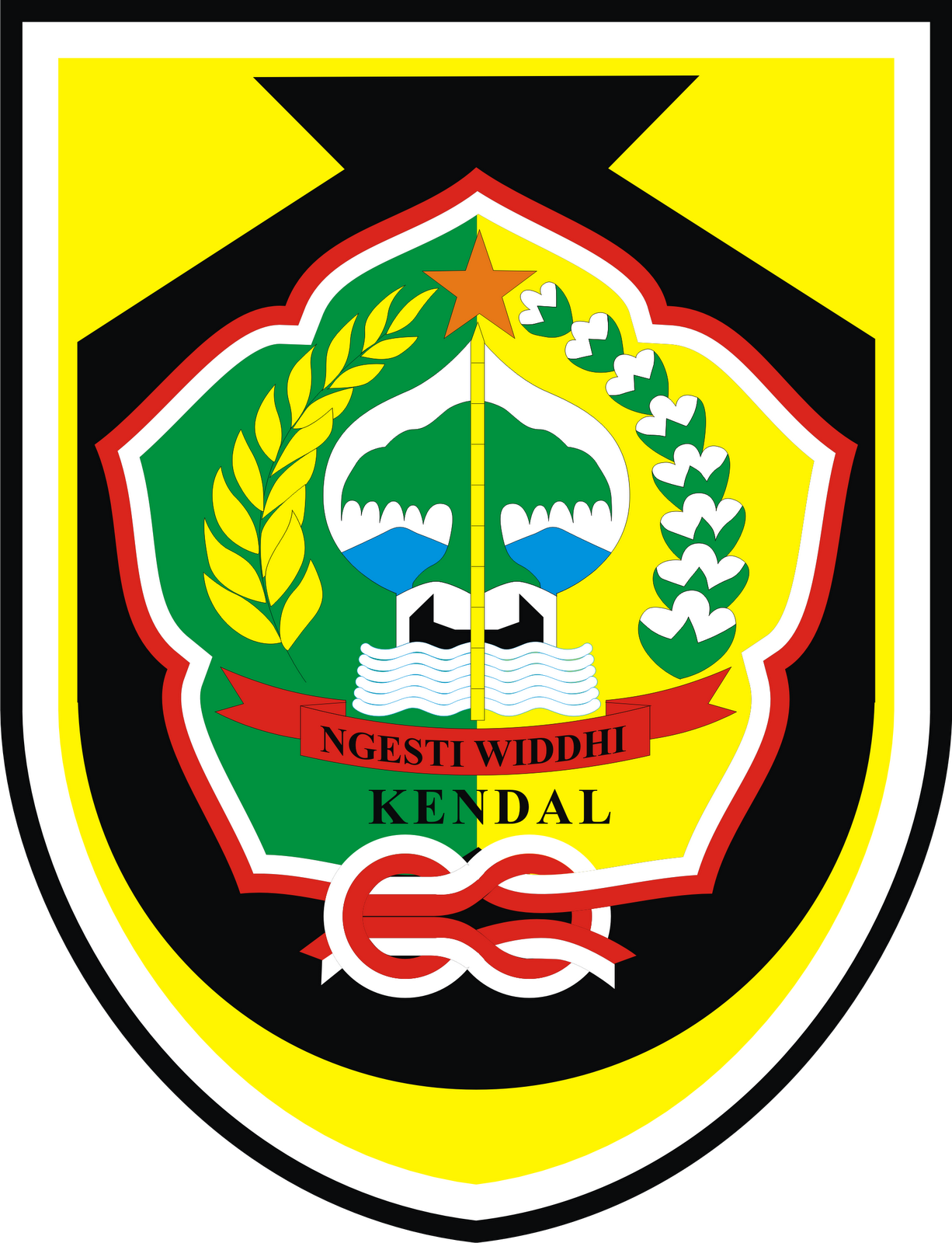
Former emblem of Kendal Regency (1967–2011) replaced because it deemed not reflecting the current reality.

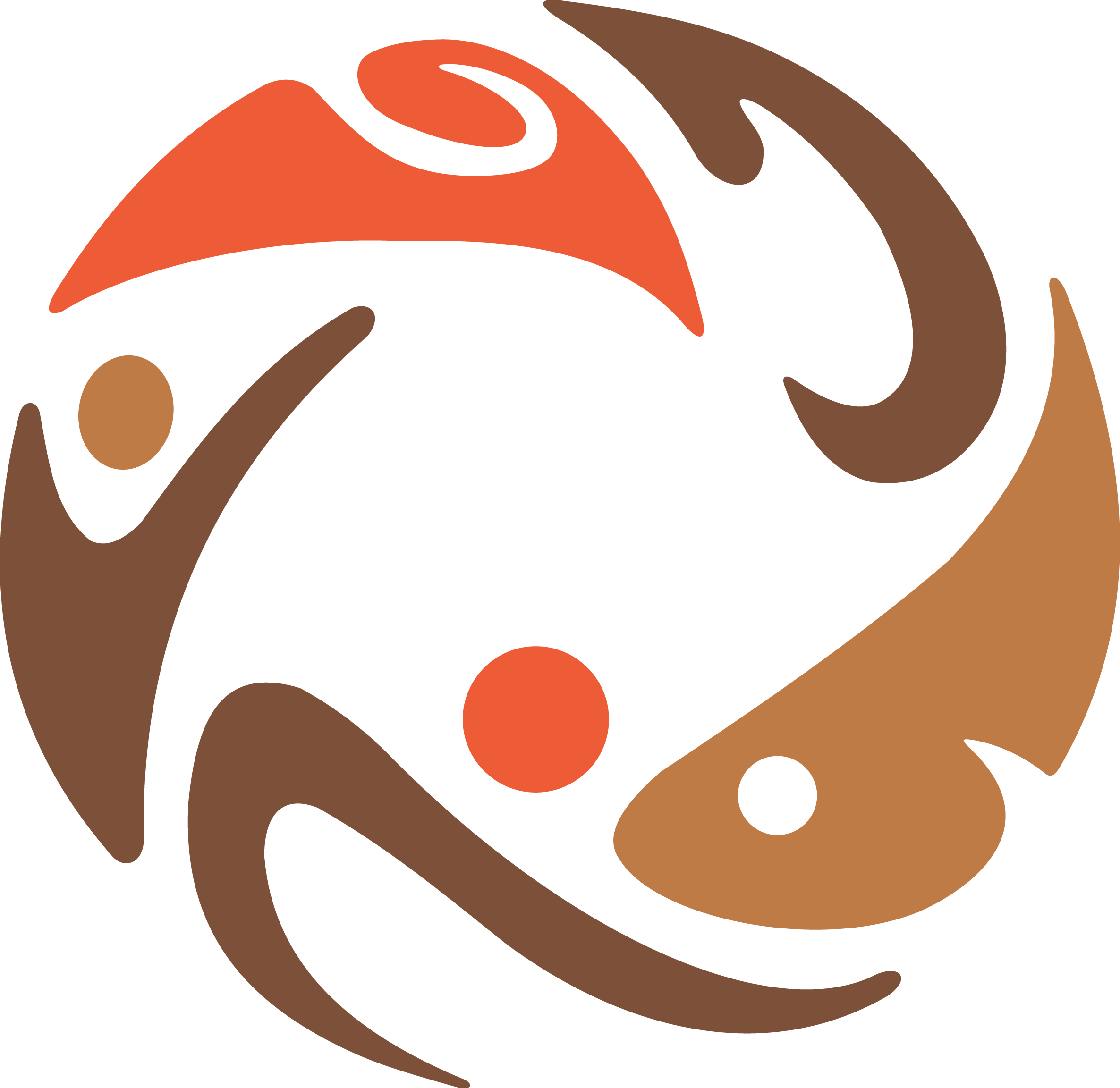
Former logo of Pekalongan City used from 2014, deemed too abstract and after negative response the logo was reverted in 2017 to a 1958 coat-of-arms.

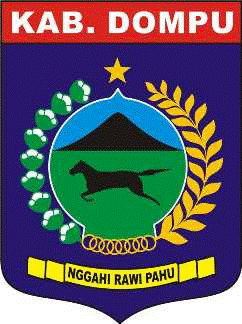
A variant of old and incorrect (albeit used officially) emblem of Dompu Regency.

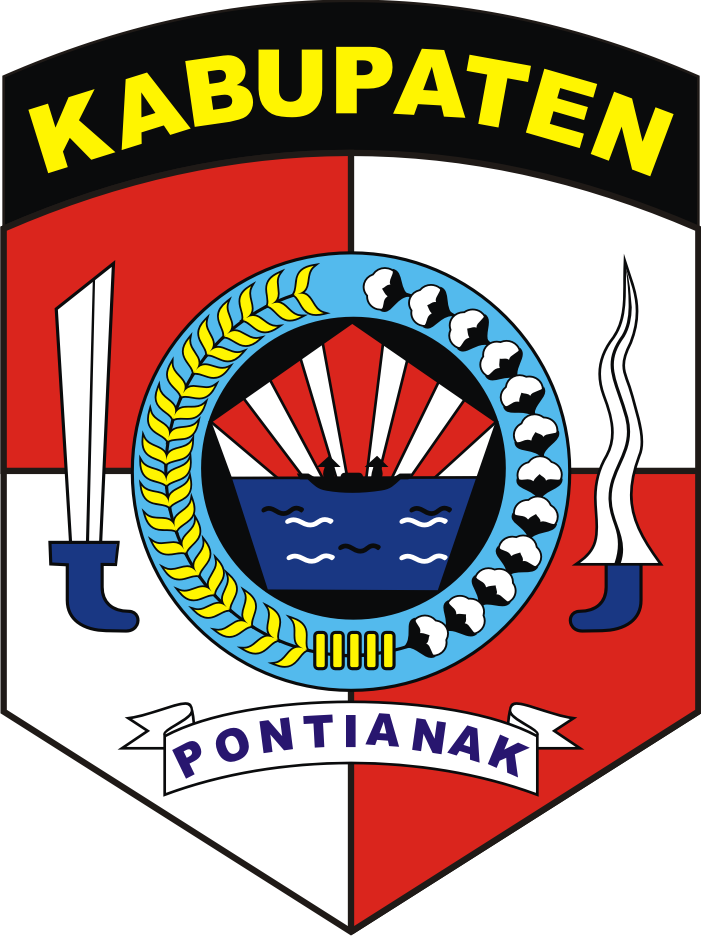
Emblem of the former Pontianak Regency (1963–2014). To prevent confusion with Pontianak City this regency was renamed to Mempawah Regency.

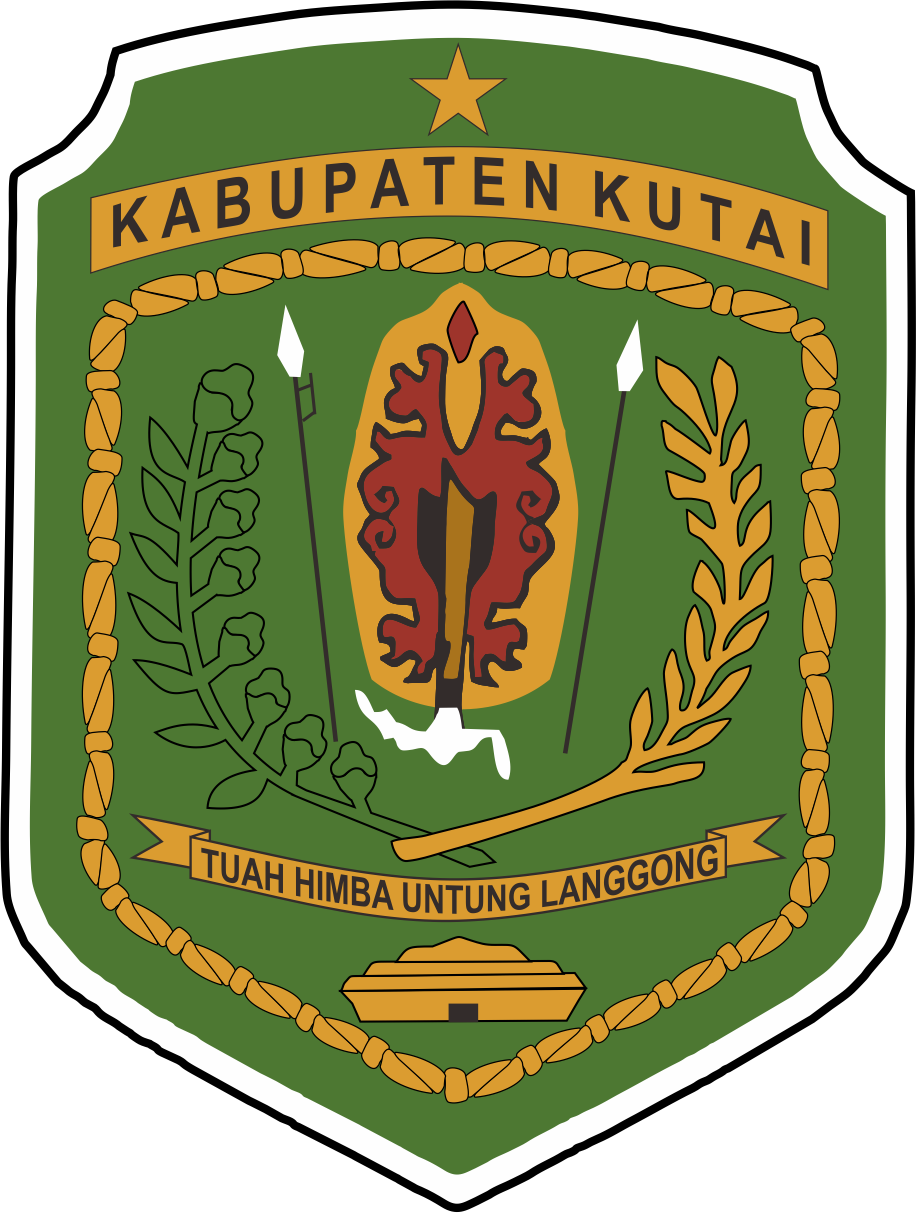
Emblem of Kutai Regency, now called Kutai Kartanegara Regency and has a new Emblem

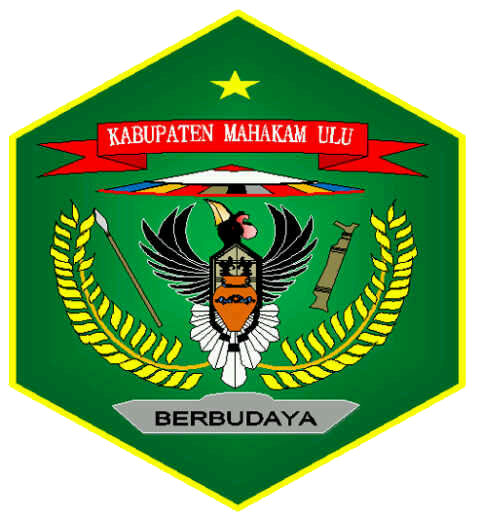
Former emblem of Mahakam Ulu Regency (2013–2019).

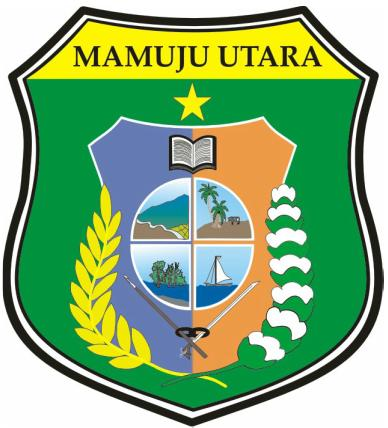
Emblem of North Mamuju Regency, renamed to Pasangkayu Regency in 2018

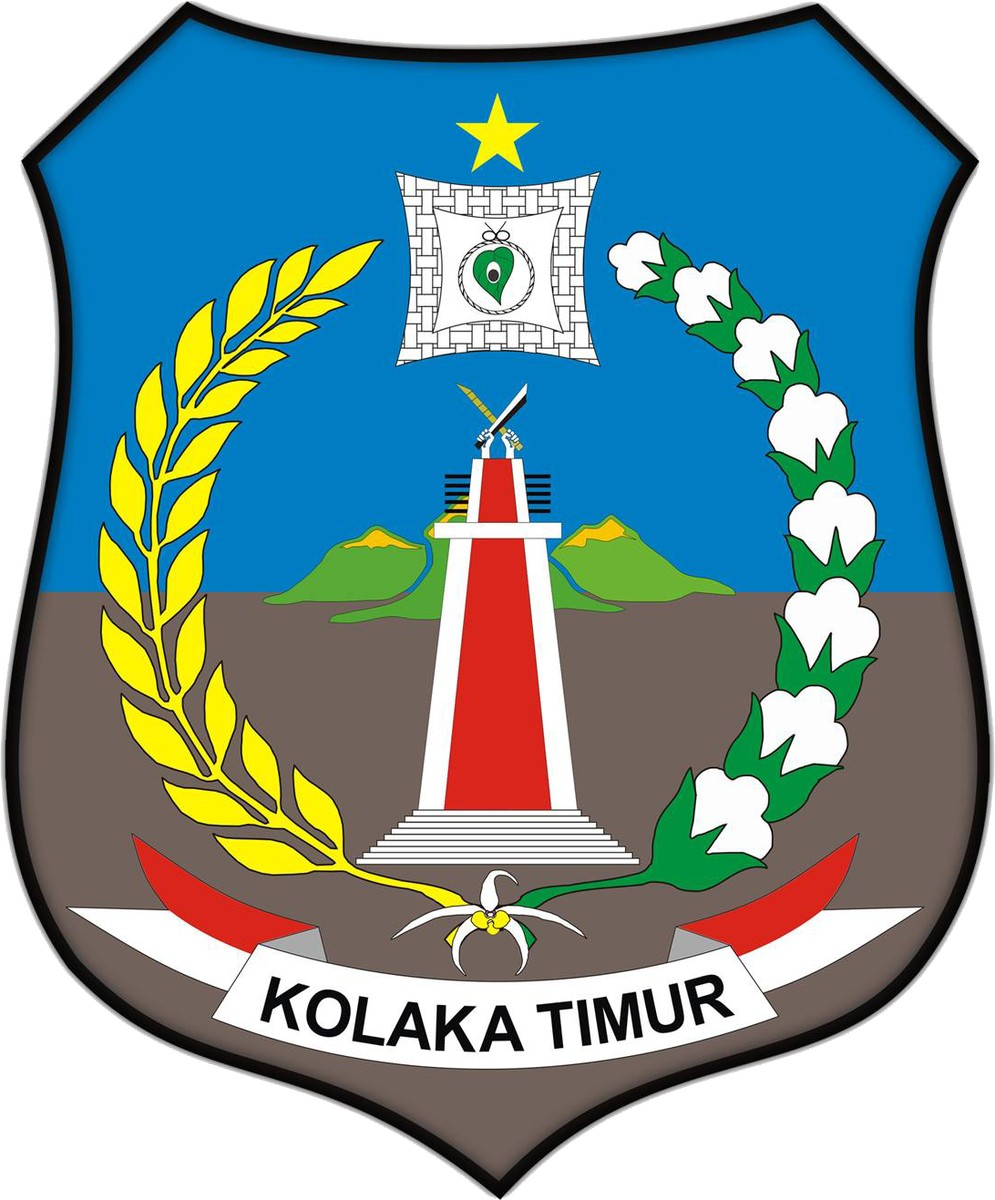
Former emblem of East Kolaka Regency (2013–2022).

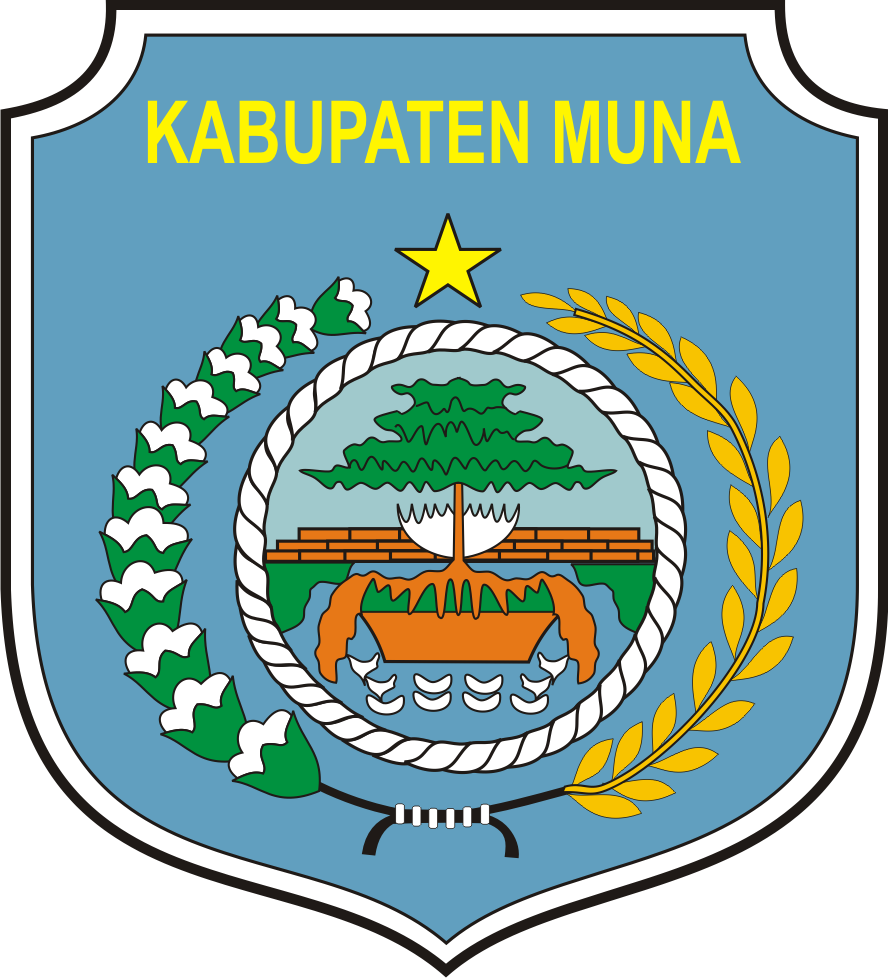
Former emblem of Muna Regency (2002–2012). With the creation of new West Muna Regency and North Buton Regency this logo was deemed not reflecting the current reality and replaced.

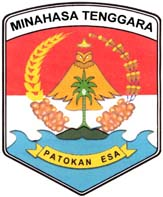
First emblem of Southeast Minahasa Regency (2007–2010).

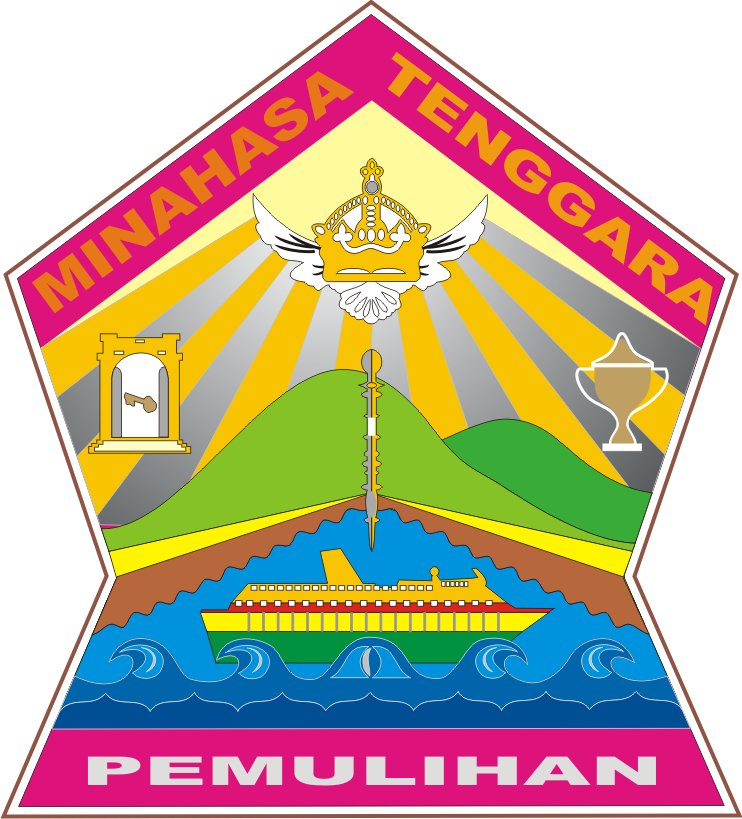
Second emblem of Southeast Minahasa Regency (2010-2014). This emblem was negatively received because of lack of "Manguni" (Owl), faunal identity used by Minahasan people.

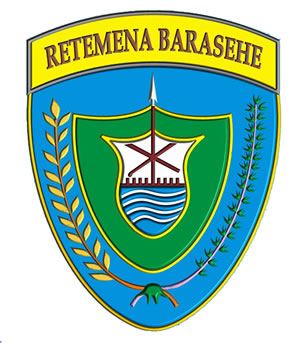
Former emblem of Buru Regency.

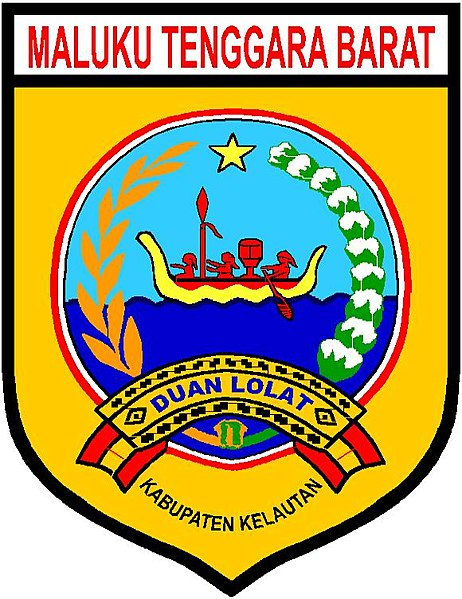
Emblem of Tanimbar Islands Regency used until 2019, this regency was formerly known as Western Southeast Maluku Regency.

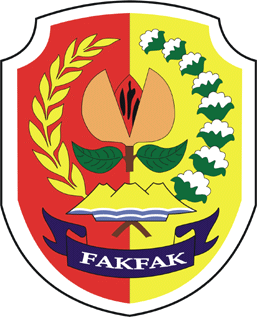
Former emblem of Fakfak Regency (1975–2008). By the suggestion of traditional leaders, the nutmeg fruit are reversed.

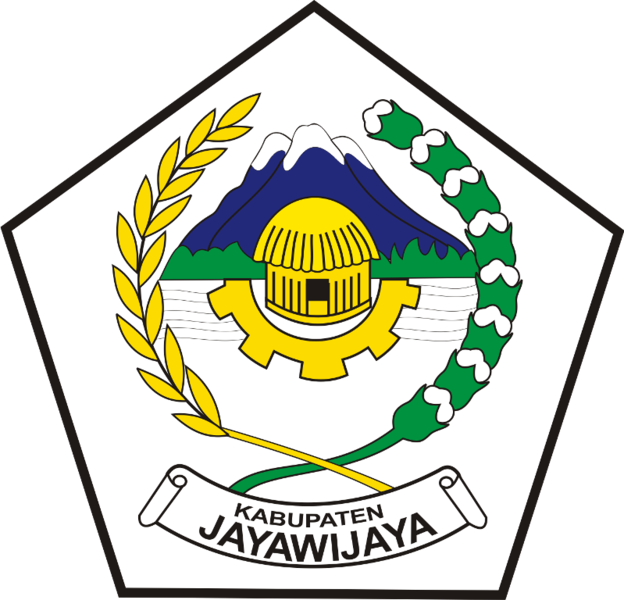
Former emblem of Jayawijaya Regency.
