= Minahasan people =

Austronesian ethnic group

Minahasan people Mina Hassa / Manado / Kawanua / Touwenang
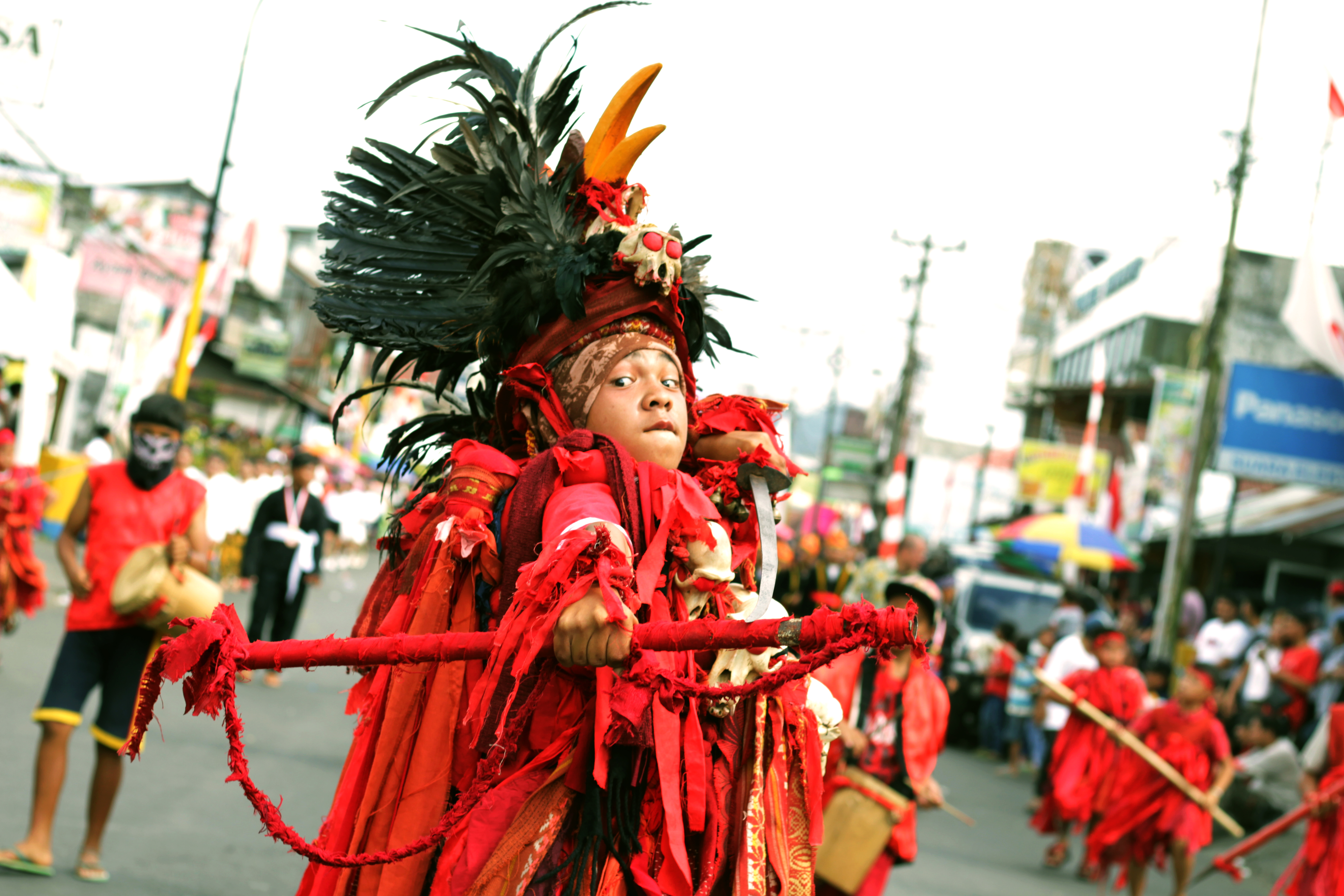
- Minahasan man wearing traditional attire in a parade in Tomohon, North Sulawesi.

Total population
- c. 1.4 million

Regions with significant populations
- Indonesia (North Sulawesi, Jakarta, East Java, South Sulawesi, East Kalimantan, Central Sulawesi, Papua); Overseas (United States, Malaysia, Philippines, United Kingdom, Singapore, Netherlands, Australia)

Languages
- Minahasan languages, Sangiric languages (Bantik and Ratahan), Manado Malay, Indonesian

Religion
- Protestantism (85%), Roman Catholicism (8%), Sunni Islam (7%)

Related ethnic groups
- Austronesian peoples; Mongondow; Gorontalo; Visayan; Dayak; Sangir, etc.

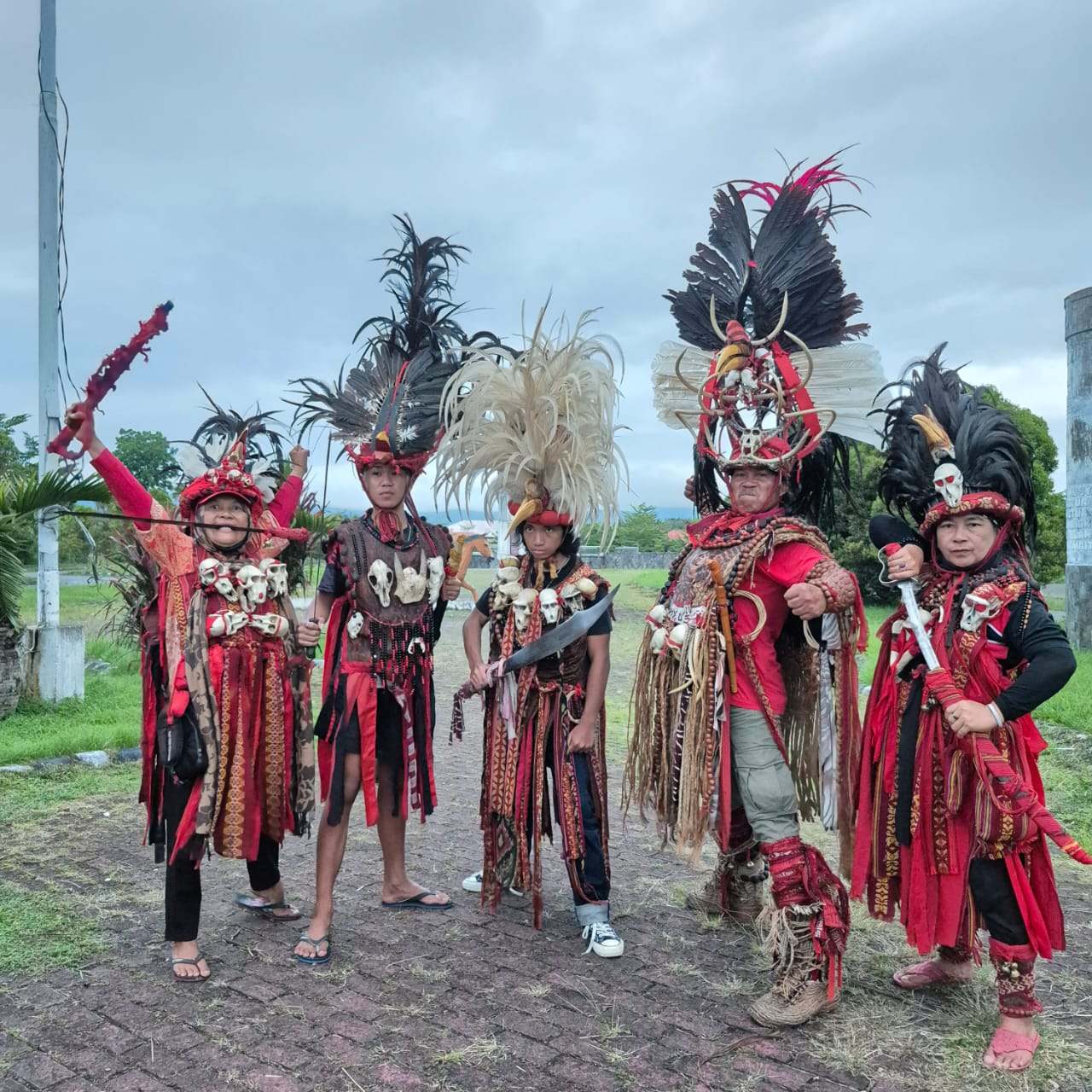
Minahasan attire at Benteng Moraya

The Minahasans or Minahassa are an Austronesian ethnic group native to North Sulawesi province of Indonesia. The Minahasa people sometimes refer to themselves as Manado people. Although the Minahasan pre-Christian creation myth entails some form of ethnic unification, other sources assert that before the nineteenth century the Minahasa region was in no way unified. Instead, a number of politically independent groups (walak) existed together, often in a permanent state of conflict.

Minahasans are the most populous ethnic group in the Minahasan peninsula of North Sulawesi, a Christian-majority region in a Muslim-majority country (Indonesia). The indigenous inhabitants of Minahasa are 'Austronesian' people who are the descendants of earlier migrations from further North. Prior to contact with Europeans, people living in the Minahasan peninsula primarily had contact with the people of North Maluku and with Chinese and Malay traders from within the Indonesian archipelago. From the 1500s onwards, the region had contact with the Portuguese and Spanish. Ultimately, however, it was the Dutch who colonized the region; firstly through the Dutch East India Company (VOC) and, from 1817 onwards, through the administration of the Dutch nation state.

There are nine languages that are indigenous to the Minahasan peninsula. All languages belong to the Malayo-Polynesian branch of the Austronesian language family, and five of these (Tondano, Tombulu, Tonsea, Tontemboan, and Tonsawang) comprise the Minahasan microgroup, while two, namely Bantik and Ratahan, are part of the Sangiric microgroup. Another language (Ponosakan) is considered moribund and is part of the Gorontalo–Mongondow microgroup. The language of wider communication, Manado Malay (also known as Minahasa Malay), contains numerous loan words from Spanish, Portuguese, and Dutch - a result of contact with European powers from 1523 onwards. While Manado Malay bears some similarities with other varieties of Malay spoken in eastern Indonesia, it also displays many differences. It has been termed both a creole language and a dialect or variety of Malay.

Minahasa Raya is the area covering Bitung City, Manado City, Tomohon City, Minahasa Regency, North Minahasa Regency, South Minahasa Regency and Southeast Minahasa Regency, which are altogether seven of the fifteen regional administrations in the province of North Sulawesi, Indonesia.

Historically, the Minahasa region was located within the sphere of influence of the Ternate Sultanate. The links with the Ternate people are evidenced by lexical borrowings from the Ternate language; moreover, Manado Malay originates from North Moluccan Malay (Ternate Malay). The Minahasa people, however, resisted Islamization. In the Dutch East Indies the Minahasa people identified strongly with the Dutch language, culture and the Protestant faith – so strongly, in fact, that when Indonesia became independent in 1945 certain factions of political elites of the region even pleaded with the Dutch to let it become a province of the Netherlands. The centuries-old strong bond between the Minahasa and the Netherlands has recently been studied and explained using the Stranger King concept.

There is a considerable number of people from the Minahasa living in the Netherlands, as part of the Indo (Eurasian) community.

== History ==
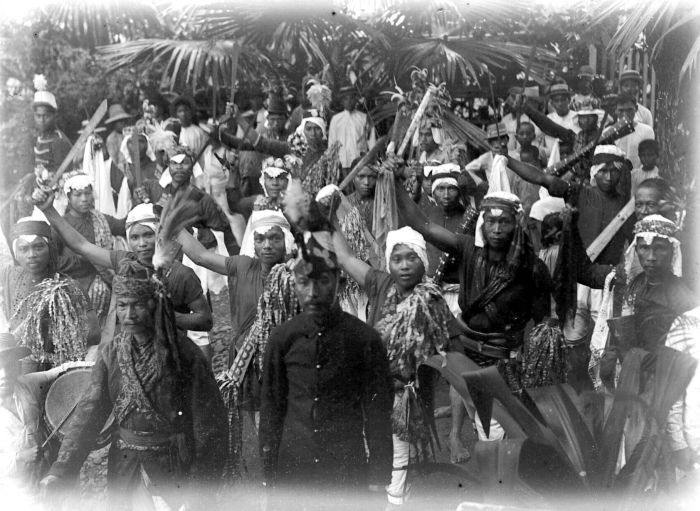
Kabasaran Minahasa

The word 'Minahasa' is made up of the prefix ma-, the infix -in-, and the independent word esa 'one'. In English this translates as 'become one' or 'united'. The name Minahasa appears in written sources for the first time in 1789.

North Sulawesi never developed any large empire. In 670, the leaders of the different tribes, who all spoke different languages, met by a stone known as Watu Pinawetengan. There they founded a community of independent states, who would form one unit and stay together and would fight any outside enemies if they were attacked.

Until well into the 19th century, the Minahasa was made up of rivaling warrior societies that practiced headhunting. Only during 'Pax Neerlandica' of the formal colonisation of the Dutch East Indies did the state of permanent internal warfare and the practice of headhunting subside.

=== Origin of Minahasa people ===
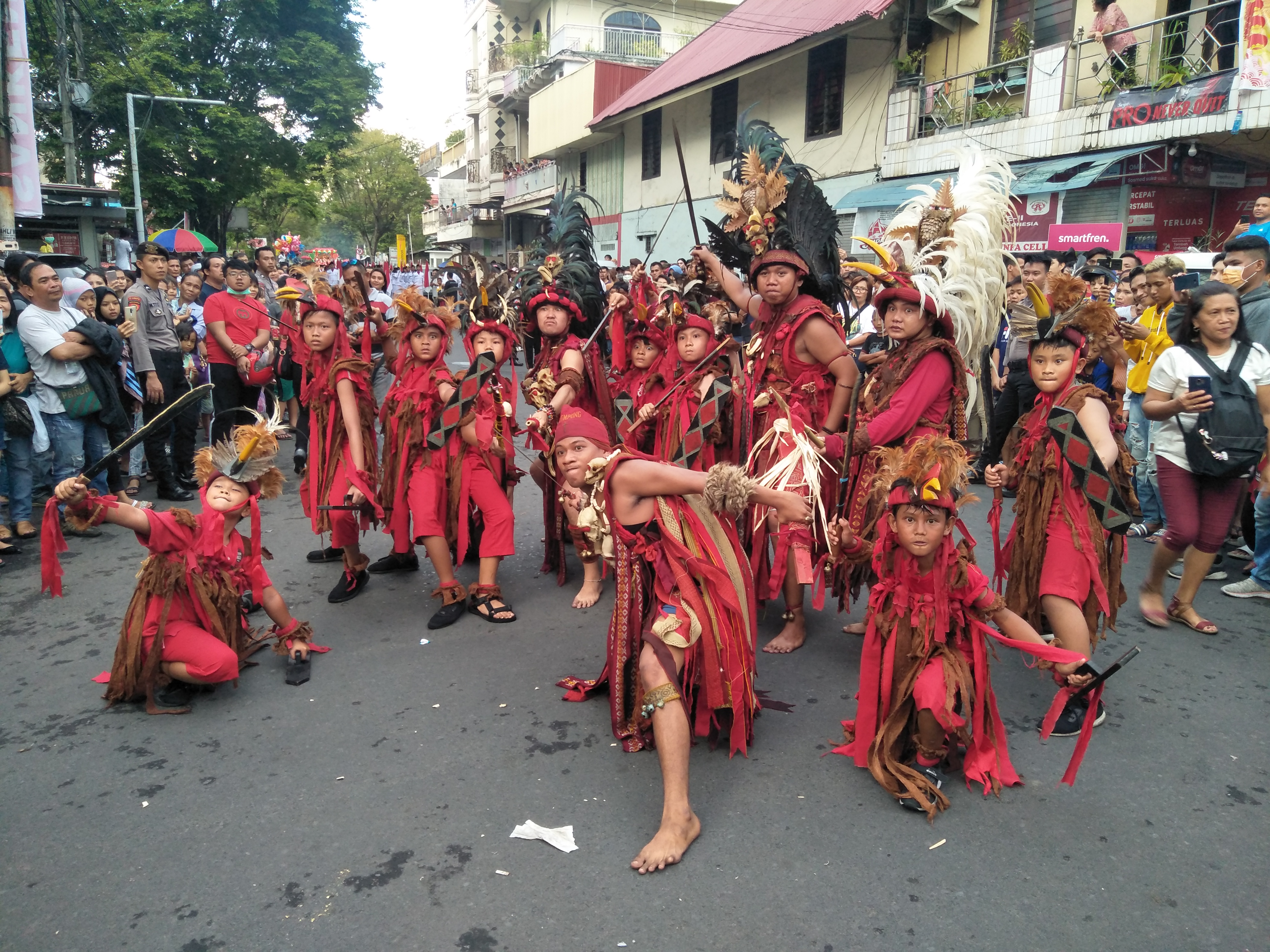
Minahasan man in kabasaran attire in Tomohon

The province of North Sulawesi was the location of one of the first southward Austronesian migrations patterns in the late third and second millennia BC. The generally-accepted hypothesis is that the Austronesian people originally inhabited Taiwan, before migrating and colonising areas in the northern Philippines, the southern Philippines, Borneo, and Sulawesi before splitting into separate groups, with one heading west to Java, Sumatra, and Malaya, while the other moved east towards Oceania.

According to Minahasa mythology the Minahasans are descendants of Toar and Lumimuut. Initially, the descendants of Toar-Lumimuut were divided into three groups: Makatelu-pitu (three times seven), Makarua-siouw (two times nine) and Pasiowan-Telu (nine times three). They multiplied quickly. But soon there were disputes among these people. Their leaders named Tona'as then decided to meet and talk about this. They met in Awuan (north of the current Tonderukan hill). That meeting was called Pinawetengan u-nuwu (dividing of language) or Pinawetengan um-posan (dividing of ritual). At that meeting the descendants were divided into three groups named Tonsea, Tombulu, and Tontemboan corresponding to the groups mentioned above. At the place where this meeting took place a memorial stone called Watu Pinabetengan (Stone of Dividing) was then built. It is a favourite tourist destination.

The groups Tonsea, Tombulu, and Tontemboan then established their main territories which were Maiesu, Niaranan, and Tumaratas respectively. Soon several villages were established outside these territories. These new villages then became a ruling center of a group of villages called puak, later walak, comparable to the present-day district.

Subsequently, a new group of people arrived in Pulisan peninsula. Owing to numerous conflicts in this area, they then moved inland and established villages surrounding a large lake. These people were therefore called Tondano, Toudano or Toulour (meaning water people). This lake is now the Tondano lake.

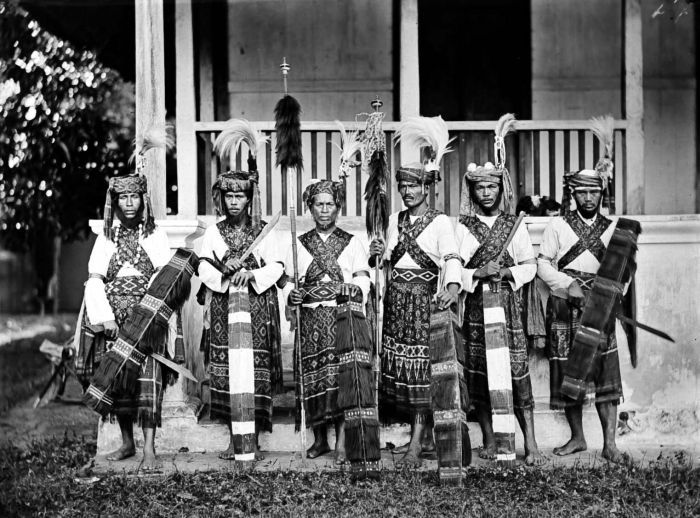
Minahasa warriors

In the following years, more groups came to Minahasa. There were:

- people from the islands of Maju and Tidore who landed in Atep. These people were the ancestors of the Tonsawang ethnic group.
- people from Tomori Bay. These were the ancestors of the subethnic Pasam-bangko (Ratahan dan Pasan)
- people from Bolaang Mangondow who were the ancestors of Ponosakan (Belang).
- people from the Bacan archipelago and Sangi, who then occupied Lembeh, Talisei Island, Manado Tua, Bunaken and Mantehage. These were the subethnic Bobentehu (Bajo). They landed in the place now called Sindulang. They then established a kingdom called Manado which ended in 1670 and became walak Manado.
- people from Toli-toli, who in the early 18th century landed first in Panimburan and then went to Bolaang-Mangondow
- and finally to the place where Malalayang is now located. These people were the ancestors of the subethnic Bantik.

There are the nine groups in North Sulawesi which are originally differentiated ethnically and linguistically. Of these nine, only the first five are of Minahasan descent:

- Tonsea
- Tombulu
- Tontemboan
- Tondano (Toulour)
- Tonsawang
- Ratahan (Toratán)
- Ponosakan
- Sangir
- Bantik

The first recorded use of the term Minahasa occurs in a treaty with the Dutch signed in 1790. A common misconception is that the unity among different ethnic groups arose as a result of a historical alliance to fight the Bolaang-Mongondow kingdom. However, the creation of Minahasan unity was in fact almost exclusively the product of the colonisation and Christian conversion enacted by the Dutch. The colonial administration and Dutch missionaries undertook various policies which resulted in ethnic unification and the increased use of the Manado Malay language.

Among the Minahasan heroes in the wars against Bolaang-Mongondow are: Porong, Wenas, Dumanaw and Lengkong (in the war near Lilang village), Gerungan, Korengkeng, Walalangi (near Panasen, Tondano), Wungkar, Sayow, Lumi, and Worotikan (in the war along Amurang Bay).

Until the dominance of Dutch influence in the 17th and 18th century, the Minahassans lived in warrior societies that practised headhunting.

=== European era ===
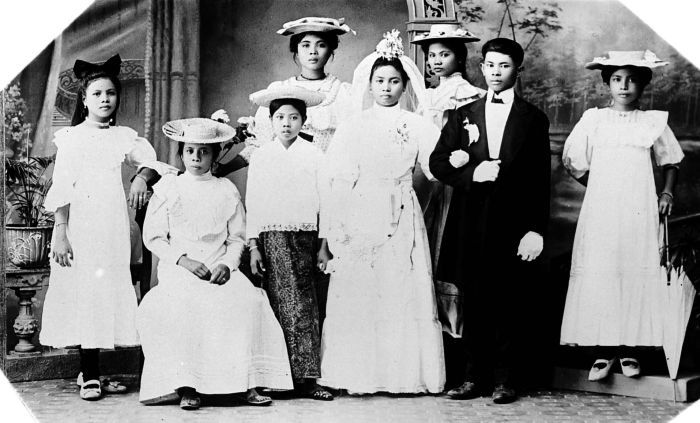
Minahasa wedding

In the second half of the 16th century, both Portuguese and the Spanish arrived in North Sulawesi. Half-way through the 17th century, there was a rapprochement between the Minahasan chiefs and the Dutch East India Company (VOC), which was given concrete form in the treaty of 1679 (which can be found in the Corpus Diplomaticus Neerlando-Indicum 1934, vol. III, no 425). From 1801 to 1813, the Netherlands were occupied by the French imperial forces of Napoleon and the Minahasa came under English control. In 1817 Dutch rule was re-established until 1949.

At the time of the first contact with Europeans the sultanate of Ternate held some sway over North Sulawesi, and the area was often visited by seafaring Bugis traders from South Sulawesi. The Spanish and the Portuguese, the first Europeans to arrive, landed in Minahasa via the port of Makasar, but also landed at the Sulu archipelago (off the northeast coast of Borneo) and at the port of Manado. The abundance of natural resources in Minahasa made Manado a strategic port for European traders sailing to and from the spice island of Maluku. Although they had sporadic contacts with Minahasa, the Spanish and Portuguese influence was limited by the power of the Ternate sultanate.

The Portuguese and Spaniards left reminders of their presence in the north in subtle ways. Portuguese surnames and various Portuguese words not found elsewhere in Indonesia, like garrida for an enticing woman and buraco for a bad man, can still be found in Minahasa. In the 1560s the Portuguese Franciscan missionaries made some converts in Minahasa.

The Spanish had already set themselves up in the Philippines and Minahasa was used to plant coffee that came from South America because of its rich soil. Manado was further developed by Spain to become the center of commerce for the Chinese traders who traded the coffee in China. With the help of native allies the Spanish took over the Portuguese fortress in Amurang in the 1550s, and Spanish settlers also established a fort at Manado, so that eventually Spain controlled all of the Minahasa. It was in Manado where one of the first Indo-Eurasian (Mestizo) communities in the archipelago developed during the 16th century. The first King of Manado (1630) named Muntu Untu was in fact the son of a Spanish Mestizo.

Spain renounced her possessions in Minahasa by means of a treaty with the Portuguese in return for a payment of 350,000 ducats. Minahasan rulers sent Supit, Pa'at and Lontoh (their statues are located in Kauditan, about 30 km to Bitung) where they made an alliance treaty with the Dutch. Together eventually gained the upper hand in 1655, built their own fortress in 1658 and expelled the last of the Portuguese a few years later.

By the early 17th century the Dutch had toppled the Ternate sultanate, and then set about eclipsing the Spanish and Portuguese. As was the usual case in the 1640s and 50s, the Dutch colluded with local powers to throw out their European competitors. In 1677 the Dutch occupied Pulau Sangir and, two years later, the Dutch governor of Maluku, Robert Padtbrugge, visited Manado. Out of this visit came a treaty with the local Minahasan chiefs, which led to domination by the Dutch for the next 300 years although indirect government only commenced in 1870.

The Dutch helped unite the linguistically diverse Minahasa confederacy, and in 1693 the Minahasa scored a decisive military victory against the Bolaang to the south. The Dutch influence flourished as the Minahasans embraced European culture and Christian religion. Missionary schools in Manado in 1881 were among the first attempts at mass education in Indonesia, giving their graduates a considerable edge in gaining civil service, military and other positions of influence.

Relations with the Dutch were often less than cordial (a war was fought around Tondano between 1807 and 1809) and the region did not actually come under direct Dutch rule until 1870. The Dutch and the Minahasans eventually became so close that the north was often referred to as the 12th province of the Netherlands. A Manado – based political movement called Twaalfde Provincie even campaigned for Minahasa's integration into the Dutch state in 1947.

Portuguese activity apart, Christianity became a force in the early 1820s when a Calvinist group, the Netherlands Missionary Society, turned from an almost exclusive interest in Maluku to the Minahasa area. The wholesale conversion of the Minahasans was almost complete by 1860. With the missionaries came mission schools, which meant that, as in Ambon and Roti, Western education in Minahasa started much earlier than in other parts of Indonesia. The Dutch government eventually took over some of these schools and also set up others. Because the schools taught in Dutch, the Minahasans had an early advantage in the competition for government jobs and places in the colonial army. Minahasans remain among the educated elite today.

==== Armed forces ====
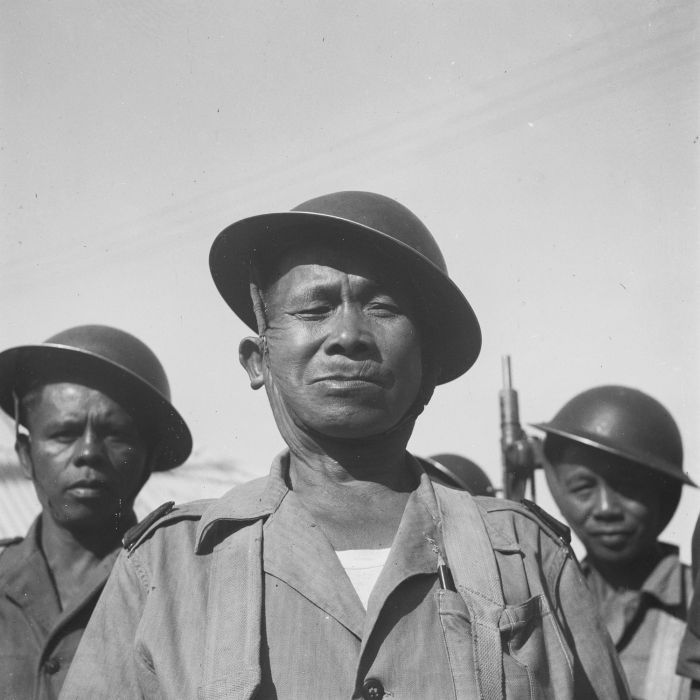
Minahasa reserve troops, Tondano Landstorm, 1948

A relatively large number of Minahasans pursued professional military careers in the colonial army (KNIL). Next to the South Moluccan Ambonese, the Minahasa Menadonese were also considered a martial race and therefore particularly competent and trustworthy as soldiers. As KNIL soldiers the Minahasans fought alongside the Dutch to subdue rebellions in other parts of the archipelago, such as for instance the Java War of 1825–1830.

As a large percentage of Minahasans was formally equalised to the European legal class, young men were also obliged to serve as conscripts when mandatory military service for Europeans was introduced in 1917. Older men (as off 32) were obliged to join the Home guard (Dutch: Landstorm).

During the Japanese occupation of the Dutch East Indies in WWII many Menadonese soldiers were held captive as POW's.

=== Republic of Indonesia ===
The Japanese occupation of 1942–45 was a period of deprivation, and the Allies bombed Manado heavily in 1945. During the Revolution for independence that followed, there was bitter division between pro-Indonesian Unitarians and those favoring Dutch-sponsored federalism. The appointment of a Manadonese Christian, Sam Ratulangi, as the first republican governor of eastern Indonesia, was decisive in winning Minahasan support for the republic. A contra-revolution such as the Republik Maluku Selatan one in the Moluccas was averted.

As the young republic lurched from crisis to crisis, Jakarta's monopoly over the copra trade seriously weakened Minahasa's economy. As in Sumatra, there was a general feeling that the central government was inefficient, development was stagnating and money was being plugged into Java. Circumstances favored the spread of communism.

Illegal exports flourished and in June 1956 Jakarta ordered the closure of Manado port, the busiest smuggling port in the republic. Local leaders refused and Jakarta backed down. Soon Permesta rebels confronted the central government with demands for political, economic and regional reform. Jakarta responded by bombing Menado city in February 1958, and then invading the Minahasa in June 1958, but were only able to end the Permesta revolt in 1961.

==== Permesta ====
In March 1957, the military leaders of both southern and northern Sulawesi launched a confrontation with the central government, with demands for greater regional autonomy. They demanded more local development, a fairer share of revenue, help in suppressing the Kahar Muzakar rebellion in Southern Sulawesi, and a cabinet of the central government led jointly by Sukarno and Hatta. At least initially the 'Permesta' (Piagam Perjuangan Semesta Alam) rebellion was a reformist rather than a separatist movement.

Negotiations between the central government and the Sulawesi military leaders prevented violence in southern Sulawesi, but the Minahasan leaders were dissatisfied with the agreements and the movement split. Inspired, perhaps, by fears of domination by the south, the Minahasan leaders declared their own autonomous state of North Sulawesi in June 1957. By this time the central government had the situation in southern Sulawesi pretty much under control but in the north they had no strong local figure to rely upon and there were rumors that the United States, suspected of supplying arms to rebels in Sumatra, was also in contact with the Minahasan leaders.

The possibility of foreign intervention finally drove the central government to seek military support from southern Sulawesi. Permesta forces were driven out of central Sulawesi, Gorontalo, Sangir island and from Morotai in Maluku (from whose airfield the rebels had hoped to fly bombing raids on Jakarta). The rebels' few planes (supplied by the US and flown by Filipino, Taiwanese and US pilots) were destroyed. US policy shifted, favoring Jakarta, and in June 1958 central government troops landed in Minahasa. The Permesta rebellion was finally put down in mid-1961.

The effect of both the Sumatran and Sulawesi rebellions was to strengthen exactly those trends the rebels had hoped to weaken. Central authority was enhanced at the expense of local autonomy, radical nationalism gained over pragmatic moderation, the power of the communists and Sukarno increased while that of Hatta waned, and Sukarno was able to establish guided democracy in 1959. Five years after, Sukarno signed Law No. 13, creating the new province of North Sulawesi as enacted by the People's Representative Council, ending a long dream of a province of their own for the Minahasa.

After the fall of New Order, the Indonesian government under B.J. Habibie has adopted policies to strengthen local autonomy, the very idea that Permesta fought for.

== Culture ==
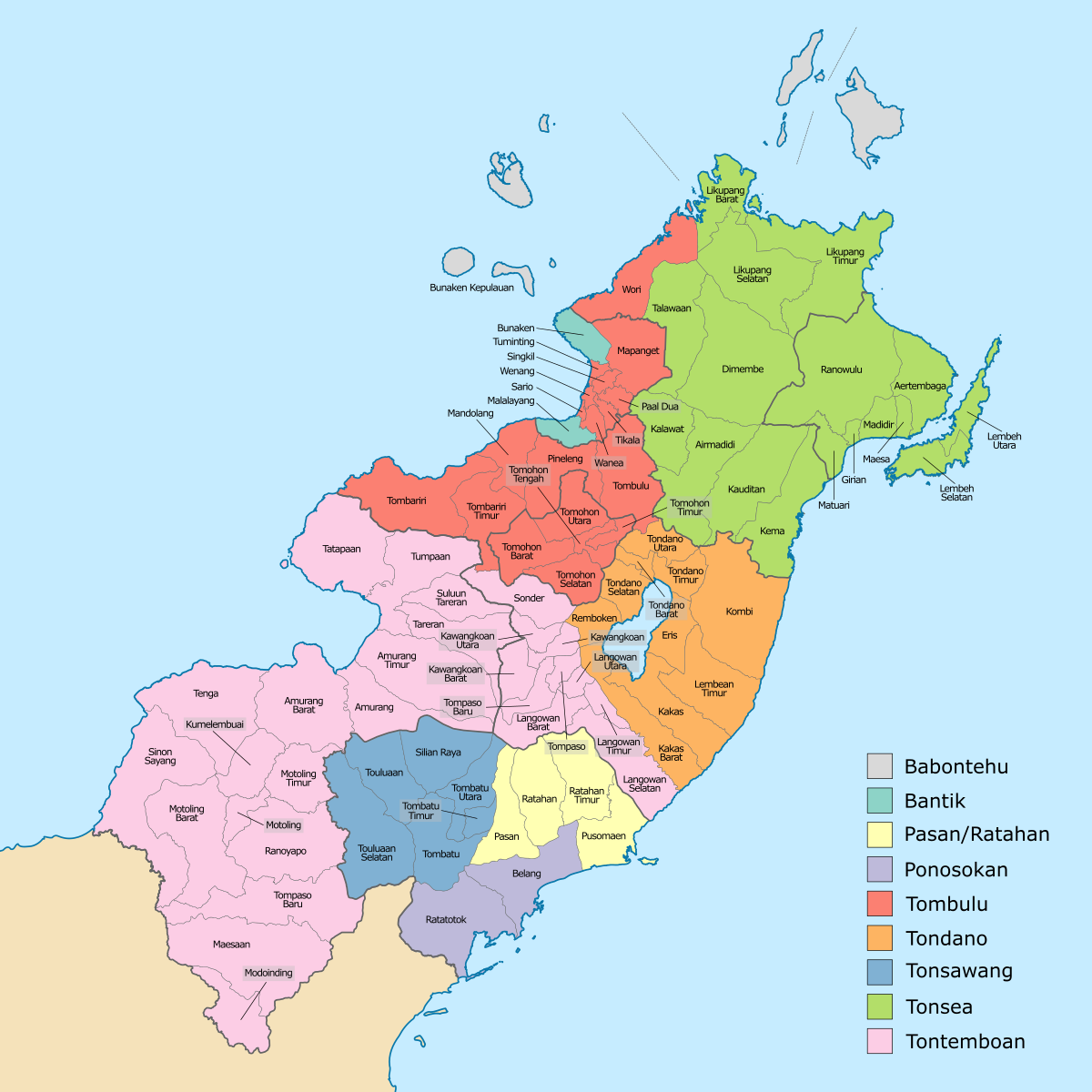
Ethnic subgroups of Minahasa people.

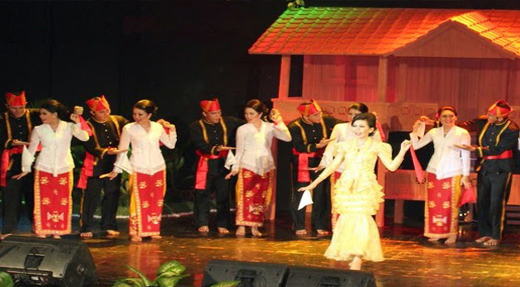
Maengket traditional dance

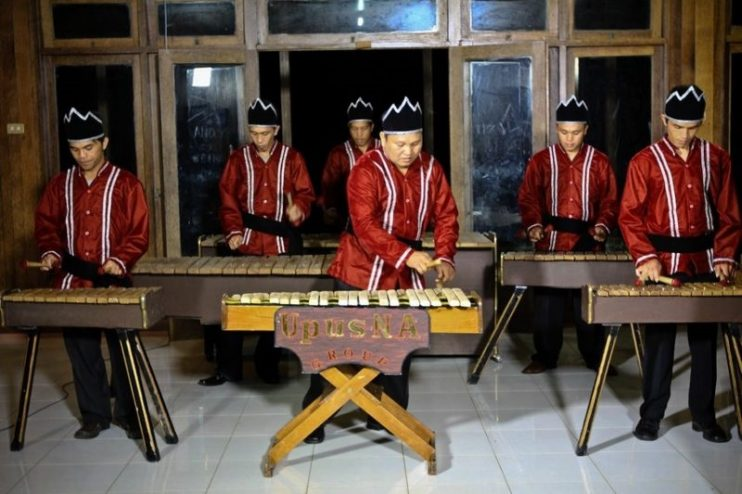
Kolintang ensemble

Ancient Minahasa society was both competitive and egalitarian. Important walian (religious shaman) were often female and Minahasa culture does not show any particular discrimination against women. Important decisions concerning the community were made democratically. Owing to the virtual equality in birth a person's rise in status was mainly dependent on personal achievements and the expression of personal virtues.

Leadership positions and higher status were acquired via two main mechanisms: the deployment of wealth and the show of bravery. The first was achieved via 'status selematans', ceremonial feasts called foso, and the latter originally via successful headhunting.

In traditional Minahasa belief, headhunting was thought to give the warrior keter, a concept similar to the Malay term semangat meaning 'soul/spirit substance'. This force was associated with courage, eloquence, virility and fertility. Although headhunting and many other customs are no longer practised, these values are described as remaining culturally significant and wealth, bravery, persistence and skill in verbal argument are considered important to social standing in the Minahasa.

Minahasa dead were buried in waruga, a type of sarcophagus, until the practice was outlawed by the Dutch.

Although after the Dutch came to Minahasa and after the treaty of 1699 between the Dutch and the Minahasan people, most Minahasan people, especially the upperclass and the ones living in Manado, slowly adopted European and Dutch culture and heavily westernized. In the 18th and 19th centuries, the Minahasan people had completely adopted a more European culture, clothing and lifestyle until the revival of ancient Minahasan culture in the late 20th century. Although even until today there are some Minahasan who are more Dutch or European cultured. This makes the Minahasan people a unique group of people among other Indonesians. And it was described that Minahasa itself is a lonely outpost of Western culture and Christianity, a bastion of loyalty to colonial power. The Minahasan are the subject of a study called Stranger King theory.

=== Religion ===
Religion of Minahasan people in Indonesia
1. Protestantism (85.0%)
2. Islam (8.00%)
3. Catholicism (7.00%)

The Minahasan indigenous religion is Malesung with Tonaas Walian as their leader.

In 1907, Firma P.W.M Trap, Leiden, Holland published a Bible in the Tontemboan language, a language of Minahasa. It was edited by M. Adriani-Gunning and J. Regar.

At 93% of the population, the Minahasa Regency has one of highest proportions of Christianity in Indonesia. It has the highest density of church buildings in Indonesia, with approximately one church for every 100m road. This is due to a successful missionary campaign by European Christians in Northern Sulawesi.

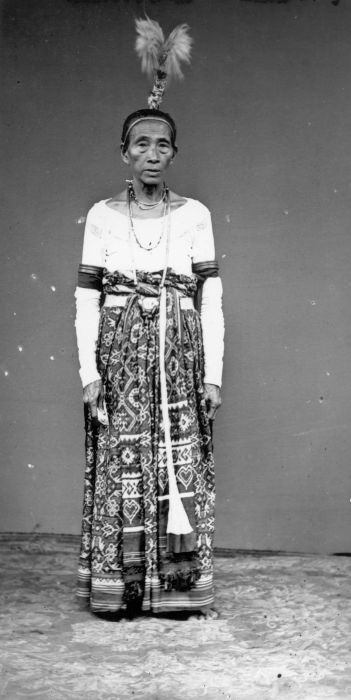
The Tonaas Walian priestess.

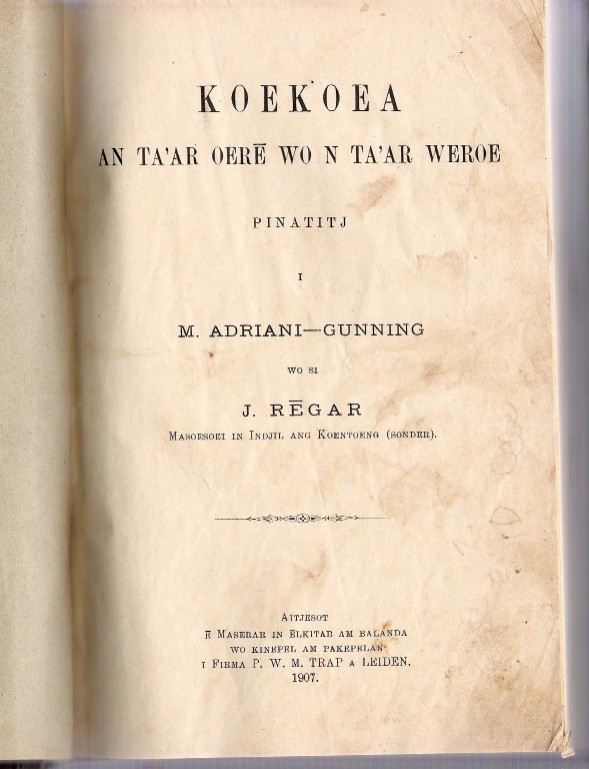
Tontemboan Bible, by M. Adriani-Gunning and J. Regar, published in 1907 by Firma P.W.M Trap, Leiden, Holland.

=== Cuisine ===
Minahasan cuisine is very spicy, and can feature ingredients not typically found in other parts of Indonesia. For example, dog (RW, short for rintek wuuk, or "fine hair" in Tontemboan), cat (tusa', also known as eveready because of the cat logo used by the battery), forest rat, and fruit bat (paniki), python snake or the local called it patola are commonly eaten. Other than these exotic meats, seafoods are abundant in Manado and other port cities in North Sulawesi. Popular fish such as cakalang (skipjack tuna), tuna, red snapper, and tude (mackerel). Cakalang fufu, the smoked skipjack tuna is a popular dish of Bitung fishing town. The provincial capital Manado is often referred to as Kota Tinutuan, in reference to a popular local dish: a rice porridge made with corn, smoked fish, greens, and chilies. Known outside the province as Bubur Manado, tinutuan is supposed to improve health and vitality.

Another popular minahasan cuisine is rica-rica and dabu-dabu. Rica-rica is dishes usually fish or meat, cooked in spicy red chili, shallots, garlic, and tomato, while dabu-dabu is a type of condiment similar to sambal, made of chopped chilli, shallots, and green tomato mixed with a little vinegar or lime juice. Another vegetables is sayur bunga papaya, papaya flower buds sauteed with shallots, chilli and green tomato.

=== Dance ===
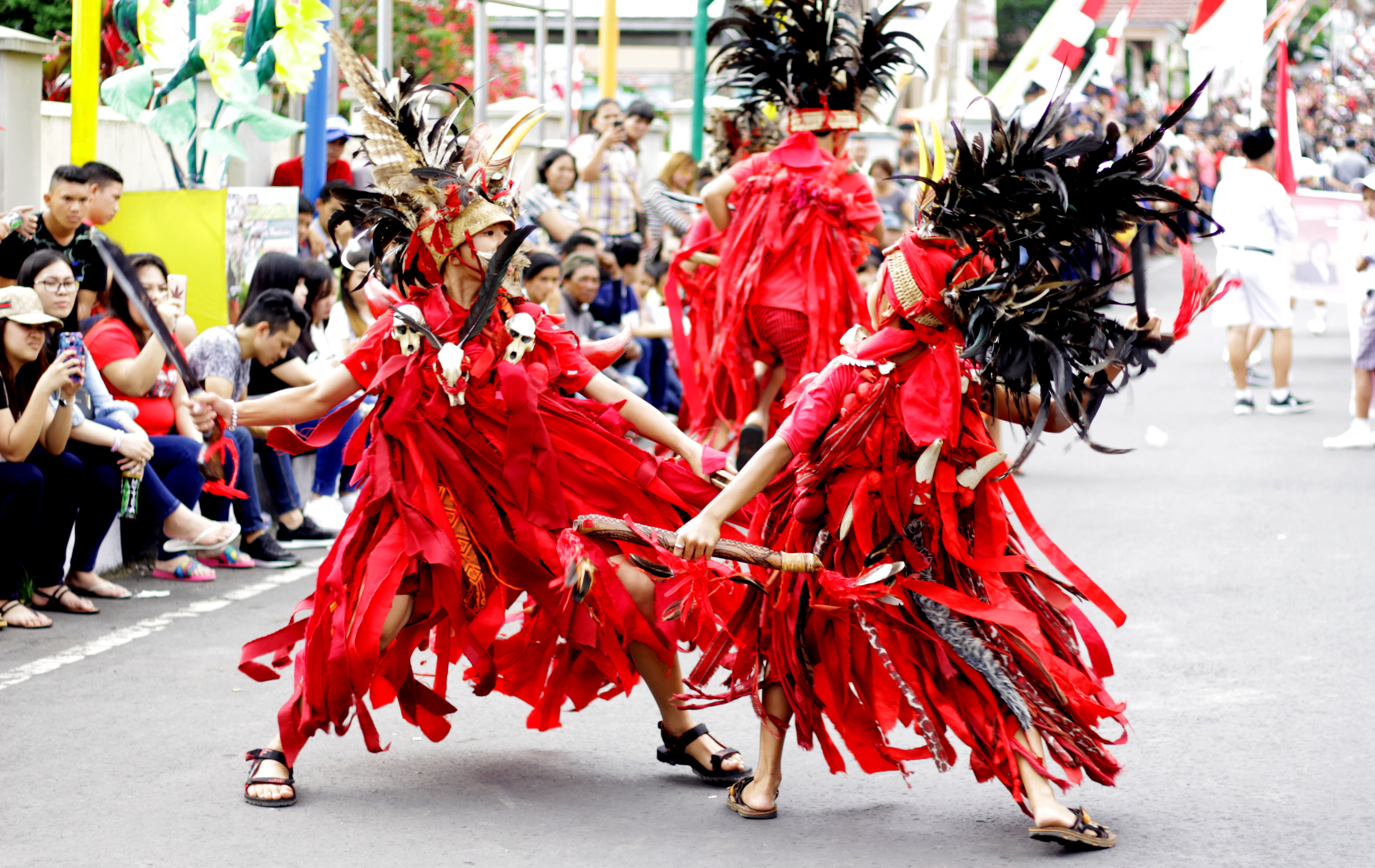
A kabasaran war dance, performed at a parade, 2006

Kabasaran is a traditional Minahasan war dance which reflects the region's historical watrior culture. Dancers wear red garments, which were historically worn by accomplished warriors. The dance shares similarities with the Moluccan cakalele wardance.

Another famous dance is the katrili dance that is still widely performed in Minahasa. The katrili dance is originally a Portuguese folk dance and was adopted into Minahasan society. The dancer would use a European style ball dress for the ladies and usually a formal European attire for the men, usually consisting of a plain shirt a vest dress or dancing shoes and a wide brimmed hat (a fedora or a slouch hat).

=== Music ===
Native Minahasan music includes percussions such as gong, drum and kolintang. Minahasa music is highly influenced by that of the European colonials; their festivals feature large marching bands made up of clarinets, saxophones (source), trumpets, trombones, and tubas, all constructed out of local bamboo, which form the basis of a song genre known as musik bambu.

=== Languages ===
In Minahasa, five distinct languages are spoken: Tonsawang, Tontemboan, Toulour, Tonsea and Tombulu. In 1996, the Summer Institute of Linguistics in Dallas, United States published the North Sulawesi Language Survey by Scott Merrifield and Martinus Salea. It gives an overview of the classification and distribution of the languages, based on a detailed study of the phonology and vocabulary.

Influences of Portuguese, Spanish and Dutch can be found in Manado Malay:

Chair in Indonesian is kursi, in Manado Malay it is called kadera (cadeira – Portuguese word for chair).

Horse in Indonesian is kuda, a word of Sanskrit origin. In the town of Tomohon, a horse is called kafalio ('cavalo – Portuguese', "caballo – Spanish).

While there is not much known about the origin of ideogramatical Minahasa writing system, currently the orthography used for indigenous Minahasan languages closely matches that used for Indonesian.

== Notable people ==
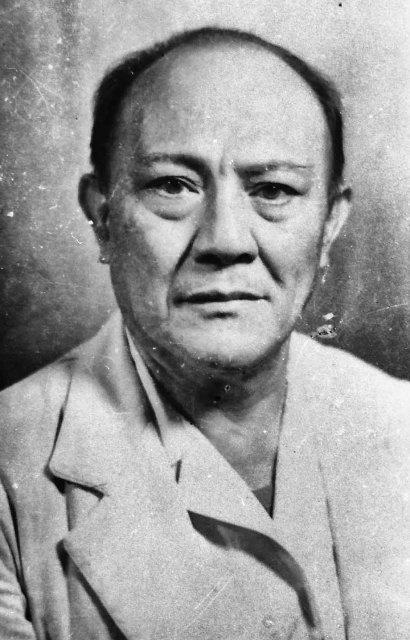
Sam Ratulangi is recognized as a against of colonization and a national hero of Indonesia

- Kristania Virginia Besouw, Miss Indonesia 2006
- Rocky Gerung, public intellectual, philosopher
- Peter Gontha, businessman, Indonesian commercial television pioneer, founder of RCTI
- Mees Hilgers, Indonesian footballer
- Alexander Evert Kawilarang, Indonesian military commander, founder of Indonesian Special Forces (Kopassus)
- Arie Frederik Lasut, Indonesian national hero
- Bernard Wilhelm Lapian, Indonesian national hero, second governor of Sulawesi
- Dougy Mandagi, singer, vocalist of The Temper Trap
- Alexander Andries Maramis, Indonesian national hero, Foreign Minister of Indonesia, Minister of Finance
- Maria Walanda Maramis, Indonesian national hero, pioneer of women's rights in Indonesia
- Rima Melati, actress
- Maria Menado, Malaysian actress
- Daan Mogot, military officer during Indonesian War of Independence
- Robert Wolter Mongisidi, Indonesian national hero
- Arnold Mononutu, Indonesian national hero, Information Minister of Indonesia
- Henk Ngantung, Governor of Jakarta
- Lambertus Nicodemus Palar, Indonesian national hero, first Indonesian representative to the United Nations
- Yaakov Baruch Palilingan, rabbi of the Sha'ar Hashamayim Synagogue
- Jendri Pitoy, footballer
- Greysia Polii, badminton player, gold medalist at the 2020 Summer Olympics
- Sam Ratulangi, Indonesian national hero, member of the Preparatory Committee for Indonesian Independence, first governor of Sulawesi
- Jolene Marie Rotinsulu, actress, Puteri Indonesia Lingkungan 2019
- Ventje Sumual, leader of Permesta movement
- Pierre Tendean, Indonesian national hero
- Nagita Slavina Tengker, actress
- Marie Thomas, first Indonesian female physician, first Indonesian specialist in obstetrics and gynaecology
- Monty Tiwa, film director
- Ezra Walian, footballer
- Michael Soeoth, footballer
- Anna Adeline Warouw, second Indonesian female physician, specialist in otorhinolaryngology
- Kezia Warouw, Puteri Indonesia 2016
- Prabowo Subianto, 8th President of Indonesia

== See also ==
- Persmin Minahasa
- Proto-Malay
