= Tondano (disambiguation) =

Tondano is a city in North Sulawesi, Indonesia.

Tondano may also refer to:

- Tondano language, an Austronesian language spoken in North Sulawesi, Indonesia
- The Tondano group within the Minahasan people, an ethnic group of North Sulawesi, Indonesia
- Lake Tondano, a lake in North Sulawesi, Indonesia
- Mount Tondano, a mountain in North Sulawesi, Indonesia
