= Stranger King =

Framework for understanding global colonialism

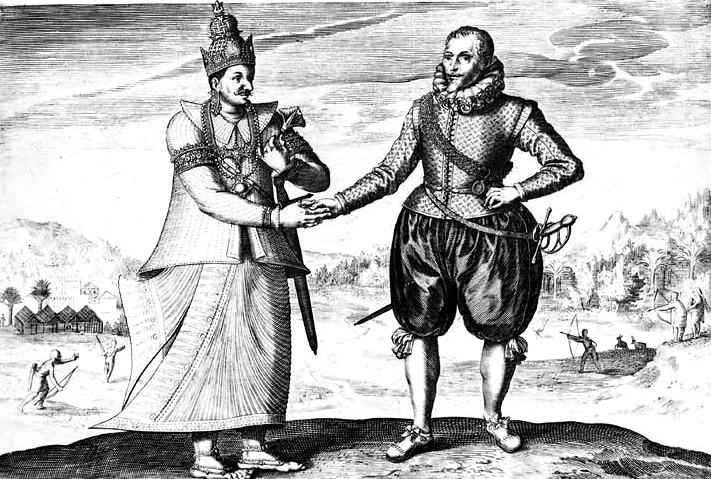
Stranger Kings, Kandi, Ceylon, 1602. In this example, the Dutch explorer Joris van Spilbergen meets King Vimaladharmasuriya I of Kandy.

The Stranger King theory is a concept developed by American anthropologist Marshall Sahlins in the 1980s, to explain why people may give political authority to outsiders. The theory was later adapted in attempts to explain aspects of colonialism.

The origins of Stranger King theory lie in Sahlin's study of traditional societies in the Pacific, particularly Fiji and the islands of Polynesia. Sahlins examined traditional folk stories and oral histories in which the founders of ruling dynasties were frequently described as arriving from somewhere else, marrying into local families, and eventually becoming monarchs. Outsiders were often seen as having several advantages: with no family ties or connection to rivalries in the community, strangers could bring a fresh perspective or new skills, and serve as neutral adjudicators in settling disputes. These abilities often led to political or social authority for the outsiders.

Later, scholars extended the theory to help explain colonialism, particularly European colonialism in Asia. These scholars asked whether some local populations initially accepted foreign rulers partly because they saw them as potential sources of order, neutrality and stability. This theory interprets the imposition of colonialism not as the result of the breaking of the spirit of local communities by brute force, or as reflecting an ignorant peasantry's acquiescence to those with greater military power, but as a people's rational and productive acceptance of an opportunity offered.

David Henley adapted Stranger King theory to explain events in the North Sulawesi region in Indonesia as his prime case study. The Stranger King theory suggests similarities and divergences between pre-colonial and colonial processes of state-formation enabling to build with insight on the historiography of the colonial transition in the Asia-Pacific part of the world.

== Theory ==
The Stranger King theory argues that many indigenous people accepted the imposition of foreign colonial influence, i.e. the Stranger King, as a means of conflict resolution. In doing so, the Stranger King theory challenges binary oppositions of ‘tradition versus modernity’ and ‘nationalism versus imperialism’ paradigms and it places state formation by colonial powers within the continuum of earlier, similar but indigenous processes. The theory particularly builds on the English seventeenth-century political philosopher Thomas Hobbes' depiction of traditional indigenous societies existing in a state of 'Warre', envy, and conflict.

The theory was developed by the anthropologist Marshall Sahlins in his analysis of Pacific communities, such as Fiji. He argued that indigenous societies in a state of ‘Warre’ would tend to welcome the arrival of an impartial and strong Stranger King capable of resolving conflict, since his position outside and above the community would give him a unique authority. Consistent with this theory, scholars such as Jim Fox and Leonard Andaya have emphasized parallels between (east) Indonesia and the Pacific world, while David Henley has applied the Stranger King concept on North Sulawesi.

=== The Stranger King in Sulawesi ===
The Dutch East India Company and before them the Spanish provided a Stranger King solution to the central political dilemma of northern Sulawesi's fractious and litigious indigenous communities. Old Dutch narratives often depict indigenous (e.g., Minahasa) stakeholders as grateful for intervention when their own political institutions were incapable of providing the security and stability necessary for the pursuit of prosperity. While these historic accounts validate the Stranger King concept, they are obviously controversial due to their source and have always been easily dismissed as colonial propaganda. Henley's study, however, provides proof (Chapter XI, 'Patterns and Parallels') that it is not just European sources that suggest recurring uncertainty and conflict within indigenous societies and the indigenous societies' strategy to embosom a Stranger King to break the status quo. Henley in fact presents abundant indigenous (e.g., Bugis and Makasarese) chronicles and accounts collected by anthropologists that explain, and legitimize, the process of pre-colonial and later colonial state formation in similar terms, and not just in the Minahassa or Southeast Asia, but worldwide.

The Stranger King theory argues against the theory that the centuries-long colonisation process was a non-stop process of indigenous resistance against aggressive military occupation. Notwithstanding the fact that the Stranger King's merchants, military, civil servants and missionaries had their own motives and agenda, the colonists achieved authority not just on the basis of military power, but also through political alliances, diplomatic collaboration and by providing a relatively impartial mechanism for arbitration. Colonial courts, rather than solely being instruments of oppression, also provided indigenous people with an access to justice, less subject to local bribery and patronage.

Without minimizing the arrogance or self-interest of colonial stakeholders, Henley states:

"We will not understand the nature of those societies better if, whether out of embarrassment, disbelief, or lack of interest, we choose to ignore either the ease with which they were often brought under colonial control, or the evidence that 'Stranger-Kings' were perceived as fulfilling useful functions among them." David Henley in Jealousy and Justice (p. 89)

=== The Stranger King in Sri Lanka ===
In her thesis Schiller accepts the Stranger King concept as a political means to channel factions in Southeast Asian political entities in early modern times and applies it to the political situation in the Kingdom of Kandy in the eighteenth century. She argues the outsider status was essential for a Kandyan king to maintain the balance of power in the small Kingdom, and sheds a light on the political process that led to the transfer of power over the Kingdom to the British in 1815. Moreover, she argues that the Stranger King strategy applies to both European and Asian foreign entities.

Within three years the nobles had come to realize that they had lost too much power under the British regime, and they intended once more to install a South Indian Stranger King named Dore Swami. Their 1818 rebellion, however, was crushed by the British and led to even tighter control over the Kandyan provinces and a sharp curtailment of the Kandyan nobles’ autonomy.

== Academic usage ==
The Stranger King theory is used as an analytical tool to understand and re-construct the history of interaction between Europeans and Asians in Southeast Asia and proposes alternative frameworks of understanding colonialism.

Historical and social science are developing a new alternative discourse, where not only the old nationalistic Euro-centric scholars, but also the later Asian-centric academics and nationalistic revisionists, look at history from the perspective of mutual heritage.

"Southeast Asia has come within the fold of a single world civilization with a single universal history and all that is meant by Asian-centric history is a history in which the Asian, as a host in his house, should stand in the foreground…" (Smail 1961: 76, 78).

The concept of the stranger king has been applied to Viking Age Scandinavia to account for the House of Knýtlinga dynasty in Denmark, and the annexation of Iceland by the Norwegian King in 1262.

Most recently, Stranger King theory has been tested by scholars as a tool to explore kingship in the ancient Greek and Roman worlds.

== Bibliography ==
- Gibson, Thomas "From Stranger-King To Stranger-Shaikh" (Indonesia and the Malay World, Volume 36, Issue 105 July 2008) pp. 309–321
- Guthrie, Anderson & Nicholson, ed. (2025). Stranger-Kingship in Antiquity. Routledge. ISBN 9781032685830.
- Henley, David "Conflict, Justice, and the Stranger-King Indigenous Roots of Colonial Rule in Indonesia and Elsewhere". (Modern Asian Studies, 38, 2004) pp. 85–144 doi:10.1017/S0026749X04001039 JSTOR 3876498
- Sahlins, Marshall "The Stranger King" (Indonesia and the Malay World, Volume 36, Issue 105 July 2008) pp. 177–199
