= Minahasan languages =

Subgroup of the Austronesian language family

Minahasan
- Geographic distribution: North Sulawesi, Indonesia
- Ethnicity: Minahasans
- Linguistic classification: Austronesian: Malayo-Polynesian; Philippine; Minahasan

Language codes
- Glottolog: mina1272
- Map of languages on the island of Sulawesi, Minahasan languages is colored in orange.

The Minahasan languages are a subgroup of the Austronesian languages spoken by the Minahasa people in northern Sulawesi, Indonesia. They belong to the Philippine subgroup.

Considerable lexical influence comes from Dutch, Spanish, Portuguese, and Ternate, a historical legacy of the presence of foreign powers. The Minahasan languages are distinct from the Manado Malay (Minahasa Malay) language, which is Malayic in origin, and has been displacing the indigenous languages of the area.

== Classification ==
The languages are Tonsawang, Tontemboan, Tondano, Tombulu and Tonsea.

The Minahasan languages are classified as a branch of the Philippine subgroup.

Although also spoken in the Minahasa region, the Bantik and Ratahan languages, which are Sangiric languages, as well as the Ponosakan language, which is a Gorontalo–Mongondow language, are more distantly related, thus not covered by the term in a genealogical sense.

== Reconstruction ==
Proto-Minahasan
- Reconstruction of: Minahasan languages
- Reconstructed ancestors: Proto-Austronesian: Proto-Malayo-Polynesian; Proto-Philippine

Proto-Minahasan (PMin) has been reconstructed by Sneddon (1978). The comparison table (a small selection from Sneddon 1978:120–183) illustrates the correspondences between the Minahasan languages, including inherited vocabulary as well as Minahasan innovations.

Comparison table
Words inherited from Proto-Austronesian (PAn)
Tondano	Tonsea	Tombulu	Tontemboan	Tonsawang	PMin	PAn	Meaning
təlu	tədu	təlu	təlu	təlu	*təlu	*təlu	'three'
oat	oat	ohat	oʔat	ohatᶿ	*ohat	*huRaC	'vein'
rui	dui	duhi	duʔi	duhi	*duhi	*duRi	'bone'
ədo	əndo	əndo	əndo	əndo	*əndo	*qaləjaw	'sun'
pate	pate	pate	pate	patᶿe	*pate	*paCay	'kill'
Minahasan innovations
Tondano	Tonsea	Tombulu	Tontemboan	Tonsawang	PMin	PAn	Meaning
tələs	tələs	tələs	tələs	tələs	*tələs	(*bəli)	'buy'
edo	endo	endo	indo	indo	*indo	(*alaq)	'take'

== See also ==
- Sangiric languages
- Gorontalo–Mongondow languages
- Languages of Sulawesi
