= Warouw =

Warouw is an Indonesian surname of Minahasan origin. Notable people with the surname include:

- Anna Warouw (1898–1979), Second Indonesian woman to become a physician
- Joop Warouw (1917–1960), Indonesian military officer
- Kezia Warouw (born 1991), Indonesian model
- Semuel Jusof Warouw (1900–1983), Indonesian ophthalmologist and politician
