= Anna Warouw =

Second Indonesian woman to become a physician

Anna Adeline Warouw
- Born: 23 February 1898; Amurang, Minahasa, North Sulawesi, Dutch East Indies
- Died: 3 October 1979 (aged 81); Jakarta, Indonesia
- Education: STOVIA
- Occupation: Doctor specializing in otorhinolaryngology
- Known for: Second Indonesian female physician

Anna Adeline Warouw Karamoy (23 February 1898 – 3 October 1979) was the second Indonesian woman to become a physician. She received her diploma from the School of Training of Native Doctors (STOVIA or School tot Opleiding van Indische Artsen) in 1924 and went on to specialize in otorhinolaryngology.

== Biography ==
Anna Warouw was born on 23 February 1898 in Amurang, which is located in the region of Minahasa in North Sulawesi. She started her medical studies at STOVIA in Batavia (now Jakarta) in 1914. She entered two years after Marie Thomas, who was the first female student to be accepted at STOVIA. Warouw graduated from STOVIA in 1924. She practiced medicine in several places including Gorontalo, Kudus, Makassar, Manado, and Semarang. She married Jean Eduard Karamoy who was also a physician and accompanied him to Europe where Karamoy studied for his doctorate degree. During the time, Warouw studied the field of otolaryngology at the University of Leiden.

== Bibliography ==
- "De Tweede Vrouwelijke Arts" [The Second Female Doctor]. Algemeen handelsblad voor Nederlandsch-Indië (in Dutch). 1924-08-29.
- Orang Indonesia yang Terkemuka di Jawa [Well-known Indonesians in Java] (in Indonesian). Gunseikanbu. 1944.
- Hesselink, Liesbeth (2011). "The STOVIA, dokter djawa 1875–1915". Healers on the Colonial Market: Native Doctors and Midwives in the Dutch East Indies. Leiden: Brill. pp. 163–224. JSTOR 10.1163/j.ctt1w8h2db.10.
- Lalisang, Manenda (2012-09-29). "Mengenang Petenis Alex Karamoy" [Remembering Tennis Player Alex Karamoy] (in Indonesian). Tribunnews.
- "Dr. Jean Eduard Karamoy" (in Dutch). De Locomotief. 1948-01-15.
- Surono, Agus; Wulandri, Trisna (2019-08-01). "Mereka Memberi Warna Dunia Kedokteran Indonesia" [Those Who Colored the Medical World in Indonesia] (in Indonesian). Intisari.
