= Foso (feast) =

Foso, fosso or posso is a ritual feast celebration among the Minahasa people of North Sulawesi, Indonesia. Described as a "feast of merit", the host of the event would accumulate prestige and gain status.
