= Marie Thomas =

Indonesian physician (1896–1966)

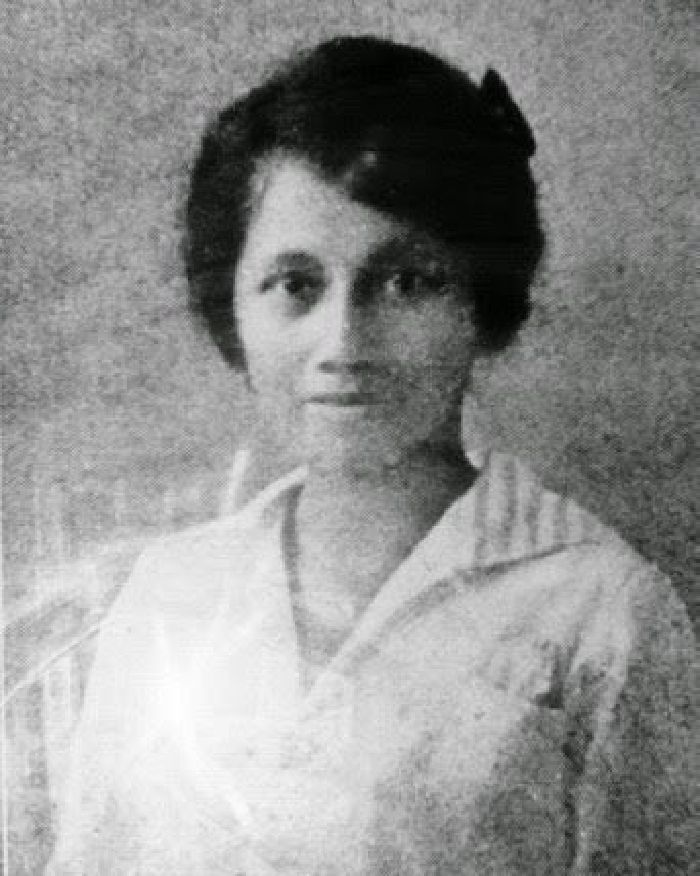
- Photograph, date unknown
- Born: Maria Emilia Thomas; 17 February 1896; Likupang, Minahasa, North Sulawesi, Dutch East Indies
- Died: 10 October 1966 (aged 70); Bukittinggi, West Sumatra, Indonesia
- Education: STOVIA
- Occupations: Doctor specializing in obstetrics and gynaecology
- Known for: First Indonesian female physician

Maria Emilia Thomas (17 February 1896 – 10 October 1966), or better known as Marie Thomas, was the first Indonesian woman to become a physician. She received her diploma from the School of Training of Native Physicians (STOVIA or School tot Opleiding van Indische Artsen) in 1922. She went on to specialize in obstetrics and gynaecology and is considered the first Indonesian doctor to specialize in this field. She also established a midwifery school in Bukittinggi.

== Biography ==
Marie Thomas was born on 17 February 1896 in Likupang, which is located in the region of Minahasa in North Sulawesi. Her parents were Adriaan Thomas and Nicolina Maramis. Her father had a career in the military, which required the family to constantly move to different locations in Indonesia. This, however, allowed Thomas to attend various schools from Sulawesi to Java.

STOVIA did not initially accept women, but the policy changed due in part to the efforts of Aletta Jacobs (the first female physician in the Netherlands). When Jacobs visited Indonesia (or the Dutch East Indies at the time) in 1911, she pressed the issue with then Governor-General A.W.F. Idenburg. After women were allowed to enroll, a further hurdle existed where they could not be employed by Civil Medical Service (Burgerlijke geneeskundige dienst) and therefore had to pay for their studies at STOVIA. In this case, it was Aletta's sister, Charlotte Jacobs (the first female to obtain a degree in pharmacology in the Netherlands), who helped establish a foundation to raise funds for female students attending STOVIA. The foundation was established on 1 September 1912 with the help of Marie van Zeggelen and Elisabeth van Deventer. The foundation that they formed was the Society to Form a Study Fund for Training Female Native Doctors (SOVIA or Vereeniging tot Vorming van een Studiefonds voor Opleiding van Vrouwelijke Inlandsche Artsen). Thomas entered STOVIA in September 1912 and was supported by the SOVIA foundation. At the time of her enrollment, Marie was the only female student among around 200 male students. It was not until two years later did the school accept a second female student by the name of Anna Warouw who was also from the region of Minahasa.

Thomas completed her studies at STOVIA in 1922 and was acknowledged as the first female graduate of STOVIA. She then started her medical practice at the main hospital in Batavia (now Jakarta) called Centrale Burgerlijke Ziekeninrichting (CBZ) (now Dr. Cipto Mangunkusumo Hospital). She would subsequently work in Medan, Manado, and back to Batavia at Budi Kemuliaan Hospital, a hospital established by the SOVIA foundation. Thomas at one point became an assistant to Nicolaas Boerma, a Dutch physician who specialized in obstetrics. She was one of the first doctors to deal with birth control and intrauterine devices.

Thomas married Mohammad Joesoef who was also a physician on 16 March 1929. They subsequently moved to Padang in West Sumatra where Mohammad came from. In Padang, she took a position in the Public Health Service (DVG or Dienst der Volksgezondheid). They returned to Batavia after a few years in Padang. In Batavia, Thomas became involved with the Minahasa Unity party (Persatuan Minahasa) whose members included Sam Ratulangi. Thomas and her husband eventually returned to West Sumatra, this time settling in Fort de Kock (now Bukittinggi). In 1950, she founded a midwifery school in Bukittinggi, which was the first in Sumatra and the second in Indonesia.

Thomas died on 10 October 1966, due to intracerebral hemorrhage.

== Tributes ==
On 17 February 2021, Google celebrated Marie Thomas' 125th birthday with a Google Doodle.

== See also ==
- List of first female physicians by country

== Bibliography ==
- Aryono (2007-08-23). "Dokter Perempuan Pertama Indonesia" [The First Indonesian Female Doctor] (in Indonesian). Historia.
- Benmetan, Thomas (2018-02-23). "Kisah Marie Thomas, Dokter Perempuan Pertama di Indonesia" [The Story of Marie Thomas, the First Female Doctor in Indonesia] (in Indonesian). Good News from Indonesia.
- "Sejarah Rumah Sakit Budi Kemuliaan" [The History of the Budi Kemuliaan Hospital] (in Indonesian). Budi Kemuliaan Hospital. Archived from the original on 2020-10-29.
- Hesselink, Liesbeth (2011). "The STOVIA, dokter djawa 1875–1915". Healers on the Colonial Market: Native Doctors and Midwives in the Dutch East Indies. Leiden: Brill. pp. 163–224. JSTOR 10.1163/j.ctt1w8h2db.10.
- Hesselink, Liesbeth (2017-10-19). "Thomas, Marie E. (1896-1966)" (in Dutch). Digital Women's Lexicon of the Netherlands (Digitaal Vrouwenlexicon van Nederland).
- "Marie E. Thomas" (in Dutch). Institute on Gender Equality and Women's History (Atria). 2007-08-23.
- "De eerste Vrouwelijke Arts van STOVIA" [The First Female Doctor from STOVIA] (in Dutch). De Sumatra Post. 1922-05-11.
- "Nobel Science: Feringa, Zernike, and the Groningen Tradition" (PDF). University of Groningen. 2007.
