= Sangiric languages =

Subgroup of the Austronesian language family

Sangiric
- Geographic distribution: northern Sulawesi, Indonesia
- Linguistic classification: Austronesian: Malayo-Polynesian; Philippine?; Sangiric
- Subdivisions: North; Talaud; Sangirese; South; Bantik; Ratahan

Language codes
- Glottolog: sang1335
- Map of languages on the island of Sulawesi, Sangiric languages is colored in dark green.

The Sangiric languages are a subgroup of the Austronesian languages spoken in North Sulawesi, Indonesia and several small islands to the north which belong to the Philippines. They are classified as a branch of the Philippine subgroup.

== Classification ==
The following classification scheme is from James Sneddon (1984:57).

- Sangiric
  - North Sangiric
    - Talaud
    - Sangirese (two variants: Sangir in Indonesia and Sangil in the Philippines)
  - South Sangiric
    - Bantik
    - Ratahan

The North Sangiric languages are spoken in the Sangir and Talaud archipelagos of Indonesia just north of Sulawesi, as well as the Sarangani Islands of the Philippines just south of Mindanao. The South Sangiric languages are spoken in scattered locations on the northern tip of Sulawesi. Bantik is spoken in the Manado region, while Ratahan is spoken just south of Lake Tondano.

== Reconstruction ==
Proto-Sangiric
- Reconstruction of: Sangiric languages
- Reconstructed ancestors: Proto-Austronesian: Proto-Malayo-Polynesian; Proto-Philippine

Proto-Sangiric (PSan) has been reconstructed by Sneddon (1984).

=== Phonology ===
Vowels
	Front	Central	Back
Close	*i		*u
Mid	*e	*ə	*o
Open		*a	

Consonants
		Bilabial	Alveolar	Palatal	Velar	Glottal
Stop	voiceless	*p	*t		*k	*ʔ
Stop	voiced	*b	*d		*g	
Fricative			*s			
Nasal		*m	*n		*ŋ	
Lateral			*l			
Approximant		*w		*y	*R	

The exact phonetic nature of *R is unclear. Its reflexes are Sangil [r], Sangir, Ratahan [h], Talaud [ʒ ~ k:], Bantik zero. Sneddon speculates that it may have been a coarticulated apical trill with velar friction, which is the usual realization of Sangil [r].

=== Later sound changes ===
Many of these sound changes are noticeably similar to those of South Sulawesi languages, spoken on the opposite side of Sulawesi.

- Diphthongs *ey and *ow are still retained in Bantik and Ratahan, and have been monophthongized to e and o elsewhere.
- Coda simplification:
  - All final stops *-p, *-t, *-k are still partially retained in Ratahan (but not *-t > -ʔ) and Talaud, but have been simplified to simple -ʔ elsewhere.
  - Final nasals *-m, *-n and *-ŋ are still retained in Ratahan and Talaud, but have been simplified to -ŋ elsewhere.
  - All other final consonants are subject to paragoge, see below.
- Paragoge:
  - -əʔ in Sangir and Sangil;
  - -Vʔ in Bantik (V represents echo vowel); and
  - -a in Talaud (often preceded by gemination of consonants except ʔ).
  - *uRas → urasəʔ : uhasaʔ : užasa (but geminated in *inum → inumma)
- Reflexes of *R:
  - h in Bantik, Ratahan, and Sangir;
  - r in Sangil; and
  - k when word final or following *ə, and ž elsewhere in Talaud.
- Reflexes of *l;
  - ḷ in Bantik in all positions, and in Sangil and Talaud when not word-final and following back vowels *a, *o, and *u (and before front vowels in Sangil);
  - ∅ in Sangil between back vowels and back vowels; and following back vowels but word final (*V¹l#); and
  - l elsewhere.

=== Vocabulary ===
The comparison table (a small selection from Sneddon 1984:61–114) illustrates the correspondences between the Sangiric languages, including inherited vocabulary as well as Sangiric innovations.

Comparison table
Words inherited from Proto-Austronesian (PAn)
Talaud	Sangir	Sangil	Bantik	Ratahan	PSan	PAn	Meaning
biβikka	biβihəʔ	biβirəʔ	bíbihiʔ	βiβi	*bibiR	*bibiR	'lip'
tallu	təlu	taw	tulu	tulú	*təlu	*təlu	'three'
anumma	ənuŋ	nuŋ	nuŋ	num	*ənum	*ənəm	'six'
manuʔa	manuʔ	manuʔ	manuʔ	manuk	*manuk	*manuk	'fowl'
duʒi	duhi	duri	duhi	rui	*duRi	*duRi	'bone'
paɭ̆adda	paɭ̆edəʔ	paɭ̆edəʔ	páledeʔ	paler	*paled	*palaj	'palm, sole'
daɭ̆anna	daɭ̆eŋ	daɭ̆eŋ	daleŋ	ralen	*dalen	*zalan	'road'
Sangiric innovations
Talaud	Sangir	Sangil	Bantik	Ratahan	PSan	PAn	Meaning
inassa	kinaʔ	kinaʔ	kínasaʔ	kinas	*kinas	(*Sikan)	'fish'
deno	denoʔ	denoʔ	deno	reno	*deno	(*diRus)	'bathe'
ʒodo	horo	roro	hodow	ʰorow	*Rodaw	(*Cazəm)	'sharp'

== See also ==
- Minahasan languages
- Gorontalo–Mongondow languages
- Languages of Sulawesi
