= Tontemboan language =

Austronesian language spoken in Sulawesi, Indonesia

Tontemboan
- Native to: Indonesia
- Region: North Sulawesi
- Ethnicity: Tontemboan people (Minahasan sub-group)
- Native speakers: (150,000 cited 1990)
- Language family: Austronesian: Malayo-Polynesian; Philippine; Minahasan; North; Tontemboan
- Dialects: Makela'i-Maoto; Makelai; Matana'i-Maore'; Matanai; Pakewa; Kumawangkoan; Tompakewa, Tumompaso; Sonder; Tountemboan
- Writing system: Latin

Language codes
- ISO 639-3: tnt
- Glottolog: tont1239
- Map of languages on the island of Sulawesi, Minahasan languages is colored in orange with Tontemboan language is in number 5.

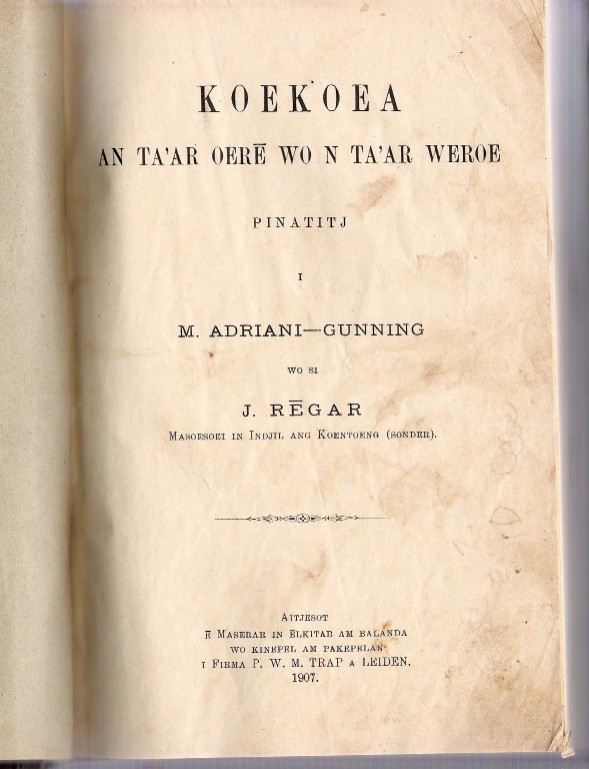
Tontemboan Bible, by M. Adriani-Gunning and J. Regar, published in 1907 by Firma P.W.M Trap, Leiden, Holland.

Tontemboan is an Austronesian language, of northern Sulawesi, Indonesia. It is a Minahasan language, a sub-group of the Philippine languages.

Some lexical influence originates from European and other non-Minahasan languages, such as Dutch, Spanish, Portuguese, Malay, and Ternate.

== Name and dialects ==
Other names and dialect names are: Makela'i-Maotow, Makelai, Matana'i-Maore', Matanai, Pakewa, Kumawangkoan, Tompakewa, Tumompaso, Sonder, and Tountemboan.

== Phonology ==
=== Consonants ===
		Labial	Alveolar	Palatal	Velar	Glottal
Nasal		m	n	ɲ	ŋ	
Plosive/ Affricate	voiceless	p	t	tʃ	k	ʔ
Plosive/ Affricate	voiced	b	d	dʒ	(ɡ)	ʔ
Fricative			s		ɣ	h
Rhotic			r			
Lateral			l			
Approximant		w		j		

- /ɣ/ can be heard as [ɡ] in free variation.
- /s/ may also be pronounced as [ʃ] when before front vowels.

=== Vowels ===
	Front	Central	Back
Close	i		u
Mid	e	ə	o
Open		a	

- Vowels /e/ and /u/ can have allophones of [ɛ] and [ɯ].

== Usage ==
As of 2013, an estimated 100,000 people speak the language, but it is not being passed on to children. It is used in the areas of Sonder, Kawangkoan, Tompaso, Langowan, Tumpaan, Suluun, Amurang, Kumelembuai, Motoling, Tompaso Baru, and Modoinding. Documentation of the language assembled by missionaries in the early 20th century is relatively inaccessible to Tontemboan speakers, as it is written in the Dutch language.

In 1907, Firma P.W.M Trap, Leiden, Holland published a Bible in the Tontemboan language. It was edited by Maria Lamberta Adriani-Gunning and Johannis Regar.

== Vocabulary ==
English	Tontemboan
north	monge
south	meko
west	mako
east	mico
water	rano
shower	lemele
eat	kuman
work	tamawoy
fire	api
ear	lunteng
cold	utiŋ
large	wangkər
I	aku
you	angko
know	-taʔu
say	nuwu

=== Numerals ===
1	esa
2	rua
3	tellu
4	epat
5	lima
6	enem
7	pitu
8	wallu
9	siou
10	mapulu

== Sources ==
- Schwarz, J. A. T. (1907a). Tontemboansche Teksten (in Dutch). Vol. 1. 's Gravenhage: Martinus Nijhoff.
- Schwarz, J. A. T. (1907b). Tontemboansche Teksten (in Dutch). Vol. 2. Leiden: E. J. Brill.
- Schwarz, J. A. T. (1907c). Tontemboansche Teksten (in Dutch). Vol. 3. 's Gravenhage: Martinus Nijhoff.
- Schwarz, J. A. T. (1908a). Hoofdstukken uit de Spraakkunst van het Tontemboansch (in Dutch). Uitg. door Koninklijk Instituut voor de Taal-, Land- en Volkenkunde van Nederlandsch-Indië [bij] M. Nijhoff.
- Schwarz, J. A. T. (1908b). Tontemboansch-Nederlandsch Woordenboek met Nederlandsch-Tontemboansch Register (in Dutch). E. J. Brill.
- Liao, Hsiu-chuan (2008). "A Typology of First Person Dual Pronouns and Their Reconstructibility in Philippine Languages". Oceanic Linguistics. 47 (1): 1–29. doi:10.1353/ol.0.0002. JSTOR 20172338. S2CID 144968420.
- Sneddon, J. N. (1970). "The Languages of Minahasa, North Celebes". Oceanic Linguistics. 9 (1): 11–36. doi:10.2307/3622930. JSTOR 3622930.
