= Tondano language =

Austronesian language spoken in Sulawesi, Indonesia

Tondano
- Native to: Indonesia
- Region: Northeast Sulawesi
- Native speakers: (92,000 cited 1981)
- Language family: Austronesian: Malayo-Polynesian; Philippine; Minahasan; North; Northeast; Tondano
- Writing system: Latin

Language codes
- ISO 639-3: tdn
- Glottolog: tond1251

Tondano (also known as Tolou, Tolour, Tondanou, and Toulour) is an Austronesian language spoken in the Tondano area of northeast Sulawesi, Indonesia. It is most similar to Tombulu and to Tonsea.

There is some lexical influence from European languages, such as Dutch, as well as Malay, Tombulu, and Ternate.

== Dialects ==
There are three main dialects of the Tondano language: Tondano proper, Kakas or Ka'kas, and Remboken.

== Phonology ==
Vowels
	Front	Central	Back
Close	i		u
Mid	ɛ	ə	o
Open		a	

Consonants
		Labial	Alveolar	Palatal	Velar	Glottal
Nasal		m	n		ŋ	
Plosive/ Affricate	voiceless	p	t	(tʃ)	k	ʔ
Plosive/ Affricate	voiced	b	d	(dʒ)	ɡ	
Fricative	voiceless	(f)	s			(h)
Fricative	voiced	(v)			(ɣ)	
Rhotic			r			
Lateral			l			
Approximant		w		j	ɰ	

/ɰ/ may also have an allophone as a fricative [ɣ].

Phonemes in parentheses typically occur in loan words.

== See also ==
- Minahasan languages
- Languages of Indonesia
