= North Sulawesi =

Province in Sulawesi, Indonesia

North Sulawesi Sulawesi Utara
- Province
- Province of North Sulawesi; Provinsi Sulawesi Utara
- Coat of arms
- Nickname: Bumi Nyiur Melambai "Land of the Swaying Coconut"
- Motto: Si Tou Timou Tumou Tou (Minahasan) "Humans to help others live"
- North Sulawesi in Indonesia
- Interactive map of North Sulawesi
- Coordinates: 1°15′N 124°50′E
- Country: Indonesia
- Region: Sulawesi (Eastern Indonesia)
- Established: 14 August 1959
- Founder: Sam Ratulangi
- Capital and largest city: Manado

Government
  - Body: North Sulawesi Provincial Government
  - Governor: Yulius Selvanus (Gerindra)
  - Vice Governor: Victor Mailangkay
  - Legislature: North Sulawesi Regional House of Representatives (DPRD)

Area
  - Total: 14,488.43 km^{2} (5,594.01 sq mi)
  - Rank: 32nd in Indonesia
- Highest elevation (Mount Klabat): 1,995 m (6,545 ft)

Population (mid 2025 estimate)
  - Total: 2,721,440
  - Density: 187.835/km^{2} (486.491/sq mi)

Demographics
  - Ethnic groups: 43% Minahasan; 23% Sangirese (and Talaud); 17% Mongondow; 7.5% Gorontaloan; 3.2% Chinese; 6.3% others
  - Religion: 67.4% Christianity; 63% Protestant; 4.4% Catholic; 31.8% Islam; 0.8% other
  - Languages: Indonesian (official); Manado Malay (lingua franca); Minahasan languages (Tontemboan, Tombulu, Tonsea, Toulour and Tonsawang), Mongondow, Sangirese, Talaud, Gorontalo, Bantik, Ratahan, Bintauna, Bolango, Kaidipang, Suwawa, Lolak, Ponosakan (regional)
- Time zone: UTC+8 (Indonesia Central Time)
- ISO 3166 code: ID-SA
- GDP (nominal): 2022
- Total: Rp 157.0 trillion (24th); US$ 10.6 billion Int$ 33.0 billion (PPP)
- Per capita: Rp 59.0 million (18th); US$ 3,976; Int$ 12,408 (PPP)
- Growth: ▲5.42%
- HDI (2024): ▲0.757 (9th) – high
- Website: sulutprov.go.id

North Sulawesi (Indonesian: Sulawesi Utara) is a province of Indonesia. It is mainly located on the Minahasa Peninsula of the island of Sulawesi, south of the Philippines and southeast of Sabah, Malaysia, but also includes various small archipelagoes situated between the Minahasa Peninsula and the southern Philippines. It borders the Philippines province of Davao Occidental and Soccsksargen regions to the north, the Maluku Sea to the east, Gorontalo (its sole land border) and the Celebes Sea to the west and the Gulf of Tomini to the southwest. The province's furthest extent, the outlying island of Miangas to its north, is the northernmost island of Indonesia, and has the country's only border with the Philippines.

The province's area is 14,488.43 square kilometres (5,594.01 sq mi), and its population was 2,621,923 at the 2020 Census, (previously 2,270,596 according to the 2010 census); while the official estimate as at mid 2025 was 2,721,440 (1,388,230 males and 1,333,210 females), increasing by about 19,000 per year.

The province's capital and largest city is Manado, which is also the main gateway and the economic center of the province. Other major towns include Tomohon and Bitung in the northern (Minahasa) half of the province, and Kotamobagu in the southern (Bolaang Mongondow) half. There are 41 mountains with an altitude ranging from 1,112–1,995 metres (3,648–6,545 ft). Geologically, the province consists mainly of young volcanic regions, with numerous eruptions and many active volcanic cones in the central Minahasa, Bolaang Mongondow and Sangihe Islands.

In the past, North Sulawesi was an area of potential spices, rice and gold which became a battleground for economic hegemony between the Portuguese, Spanish and Dutch, and also the neighbouring kingdoms. This ultimately led to political and military struggles. This region also became a trading route between west and east and also a route for the spread of Christianity, Islam and beliefs brought by Chinese merchants. The Portuguese first landed in the area at the 16th century. After decades of war between the Portuguese, the Spanish and the Dutch to control the area, the area ultimately fell to the Dutch in the 17th century. The Dutch ruled the area for three centuries, before being ousted by the Japanese on the eve of World War II. After the Japanese surrendered in 1945, the Dutch briefly regained possession of the area, before finally leaving in 1949 following the Round Table Conference, in which the Dutch recognized the newly created United States of Indonesia (RIS). Thus, North Sulawesi was incorporated into the territory of the State of East Indonesia (NIT). The NIT was finally dissolved and then merged into the RIS.

On 17 August 1950, the RIS was officially disbanded and then re-formed as the unitary state of the Republic of Indonesia. The island of Sulawesi was governed briefly as a single province, before being separated into several different provinces. Thus, the province of North Sulawesi was created on 14 August 1959. The western half of this area (at that time comprising the Gorontalo Regency and the newly created Boalemo Regency) were separated from North Sulawesi on 5 December 2000 and established as the province of Gorontalo.

== Etymology ==
The area around North Sulawesi used to be called Minahasa. The name is still used sometimes to refer to the province. The word Minahasa is etymologically derived from the words Mina-Esa (Minaesa) or Maesa which means 'being one' or 'uniting', meaning hope to unite various sub-ethnic groups of Minahasa consisting of Tontemboan, Tombulu, Tonsea, Tolour (Tondano), Tonsawang, Ponosakan, Pasan and Bantik. The word "Minahasa" itself was only used during the colonial era. "Minahasa" is generally interpreted as "having become one". Based on several historical documents, the word "Minahasa" is firstly used by J.D. Schierstein, the Dutch regent of Manado, in his report to the Governor of Maluku on 8 October 1789. The word "Minahasa" in his report is defined as Landraad or "State Council" or "Regional Council".

== History ==
=== Pre-Colonial Era ===
Archaeological research has revealed signs of human life in North Sulawesi from 30,000 years ago, based on evidence in the cave Liang Sarru on the island of Salibabu. Other evidence shows life about 6,000 years ago on the Passo Hillside Site in Kakas District and 4,000 years ago to early AD at the Liang Tuo Mane'e cave in Arangkaa on Karakelong Island.

=== Colonial Period ===
At the end of the 16th century, the Portuguese and Spanish arrived in North Sulawesi. When Europeans arrived, the Ternate Sultanate had influence in North Sulawesi, frequented by Bugis traders from South Sulawesi. The wealth of Minahasa's natural resources made Manado a strategic port for European traders going to and from Maluku. The Portuguese were the first European colonizers to arrive in North Sulawesi, a Portuguese ship anchored on an island off Manado in the Kingdom of Manado in 1521. The northern islands of the peninsula were under the control of the Sultanate of Maguindanao during the time. The Spanish ship docked on the island of Talaud and Siau, on to Ternate. The Portuguese built a fort at Amurang. Spain built a Fort in Manado, giving Spain control of the Minahasa Peninsula. Resistance against Spanish occupation culminated in 1660–1664. Dutch ships landed in Manado City in 1660, assisting the Minahasa Confederation against Spain. The members of the Minahasa Confederation entered into a Trade Agreement with the VOC. This trade cooperation agreement gave the VOC monopoly on trade, gradually imposing its will, eventually leading to the 1700s resistance in Ratahan, culminating in the Dutch Minahasa-War in 1809–1811 at Tondano.

Spain had colonized the Philippines and made Minahasa a coffee plantation with imported South American coffee because of its fertile land. Manado was further developed by Spain to become a center of coffee trade for Chinese merchants. In the 16th century one of the first Indo-Eurasian communities in the archipelago appeared in Manado. The first king of Manado, Muntu Untu (1630) was half Spanish. Spain then handed over Minahasa to the Portuguese in exchange for 350,000 ducats in a treaty. The rulers of Minahasa sent Supit, Pa'at, and Lontoh to ally with the Dutch to expel the Portuguese from Minahasa. In 1655 they excelled, building their own fortress in 1658 and drove out the last Portuguese a few years later.

By the beginning of the 17th century the Dutch had overthrown the sultanate of Ternate, and began to gain influence from Spain and Portugal. In 1677 the Dutch conquered the Sangir archipelago, two years later, Robert Padtbrugge, the governor of Maluku, visited Manado. His arrival resulted in an agreement with the Minahasan chiefs who led to Dutch domination for the next 300 years although the direct rule by the Dutch only began in 1870. The Dutch helped unify the Minahasa confederation, and in 1693. Dutch influence flourished with the spreading of Christianity and European culture in the land of Minahasa. The missionary schools in Manado in 1881 were one of the first attempts of mass education in Indonesia, providing an opportunity for graduates to find employment in the civil service, military, and high positions in the Dutch East Indies government. Minahasa relations with the Dutch were often poor. Causing a war between the Dutch and Tondano in 1807 and 1809. Eventually the Dutch and Minahasa became very close, with Minahasa often referred to as the 12th Dutch province. In 1947, some Manadonese formed a political movement of Twapro, short for Twaalfde Provincie (Twelfth Province) who appealed for formal integration of Minahasa into the Kingdom of the Netherlands.

=== Independence ===
Reduction of North Sulawesi territories from 1960 until 2000

During Japanese occupation of the Dutch East Indies the Allies bombed Manado greatly in 1945. During the Indonesian War of Independence, there was a split between pro-Indonesian and pro-Dutch residents. The appointment of Sam Ratulangi as the first governor of Sulawesi then succeeded in winning Minahasan support to the Republic of Indonesia. After Indonesian independence, Indonesia was divided into 8 provinces, and Sulawesi was one of these provinces. In 1946 the State of East Indonesia was formed in Sulawesi, and later became a state within the United States of Indonesia. The State of East Indonesia was dissolved, and merged into the Republic of Indonesia as part of a then unified Sulawesi Province.

In March 1957, Sulawesi military leaders held a confrontation with the central government, with demands for greater regional autonomy. They called for more active development, a fairer distribution of taxes, assistance against Abdul Kahar Muzakkar's rebellion in South Sulawesi, and a central government cabinet headed by Sukarno and Mohammad Hatta in balance. At first the movement of the 'Permesta' (Charter of the Struggle of the Universe) was merely a movement of reform rather than a separatist movement.

Negotiations between the central government and Sulawesi military leaders prevented violence in South Sulawesi, but Minahasan leaders were not satisfied with the outcome of the agreement and the movement broke out. Fearful of southern dominance, Minahasan leaders declared their own North Sulawesi autonomous state in June 1957. At that time the central government had controlled South Sulawesi, but in the North there were no strong figures of the central government and there were rumors that the United States was arming the PRRI rebellion in Sumatra, which has links with Minahasan leaders.

The possibility of foreign intervention prompted the central government to request military assistance from southern Sulawesi. The Permesta forces were later removed from Central Sulawesi, Gorontalo, Sangihe Islands, and Morotai in Moluccas. The United States then halted resistance, and in June 1958 central government forces landed in Minahasa. The Permesta uprising ended in mid-1961.

The effects of the Sumatra and Sulawesi rebellions was ultimately counterproductive, with central government authority increasing while regional autonomy weakened, radical nationalism strengthened than pragmatic moderation, communist party power and Sukarno increased while Mohammad Hatta was weakened, with the establishing of Guided Democracy (Indonesian: Demokrasi Terpimpin) in 1958. But the demands of the Minahasa peoples for the province of their own would not end, and in 1964 the People's Representative Council enacted Law no. 13 officially creating the province of North Sulawesi, with Manado as provincial seat. 14 August 1959 was designated as the anniversary of the province.

Since the 1998 reforms, the Indonesian government has begun to adopt laws that enhanced regional autonomy. Two years later, the city of Gorontalo and two Muslim-majority regencies of the province were separated to form Gorontalo Province.

== Environment ==
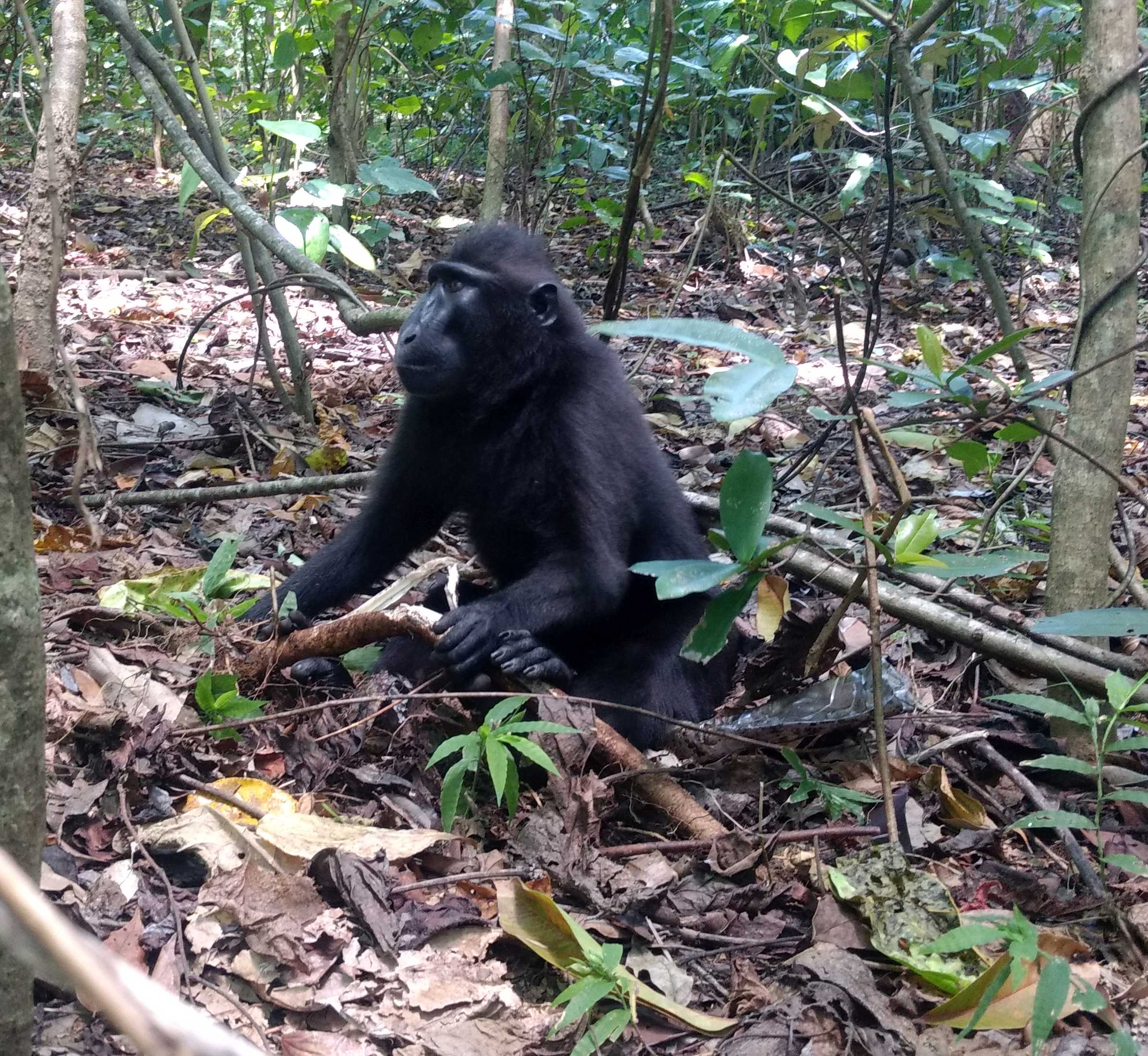
Black crested macaques living in the Tangkoko nature reserve near Bitung

=== Climate ===
Climate areas of North Sulawesi include tropical ones affected by muzon winds. In the months of November to April the West winds bring rain on the north coast, whereas in May to October a dry south wind changes. Uneven rainfall with annual rates ranging from 2,000 to 3,000 mm (79 to 118 in), and the number of rainy days between 90 and 139 days. Temperatures are at every level up to the height of the cool as the city area Tomohon, Langowan in Minahasa Regency, Modoinding in Minahasa Selatan Regency, Kotamobagu city, and Modayag and Pasi in Bolaang Mongondow Regency. The area that receives the most rainfall is the Minahasa area. Temperatures average 25 °C (77 °F). The average maximum air temperature was recorded at 30 °C (86 °F) and the minimum average air temperature was 22.1 °C (71.8 °F).

The air humidity was 73.4%. However, the temperature is also affected by the altitude of the place above sea level. The higher the location, the lower the temperature also, with the calculation of every 100-metre (330 ft) increase can lower the temperature by around 0.6 °C (1.1 °F).

=== Geography ===
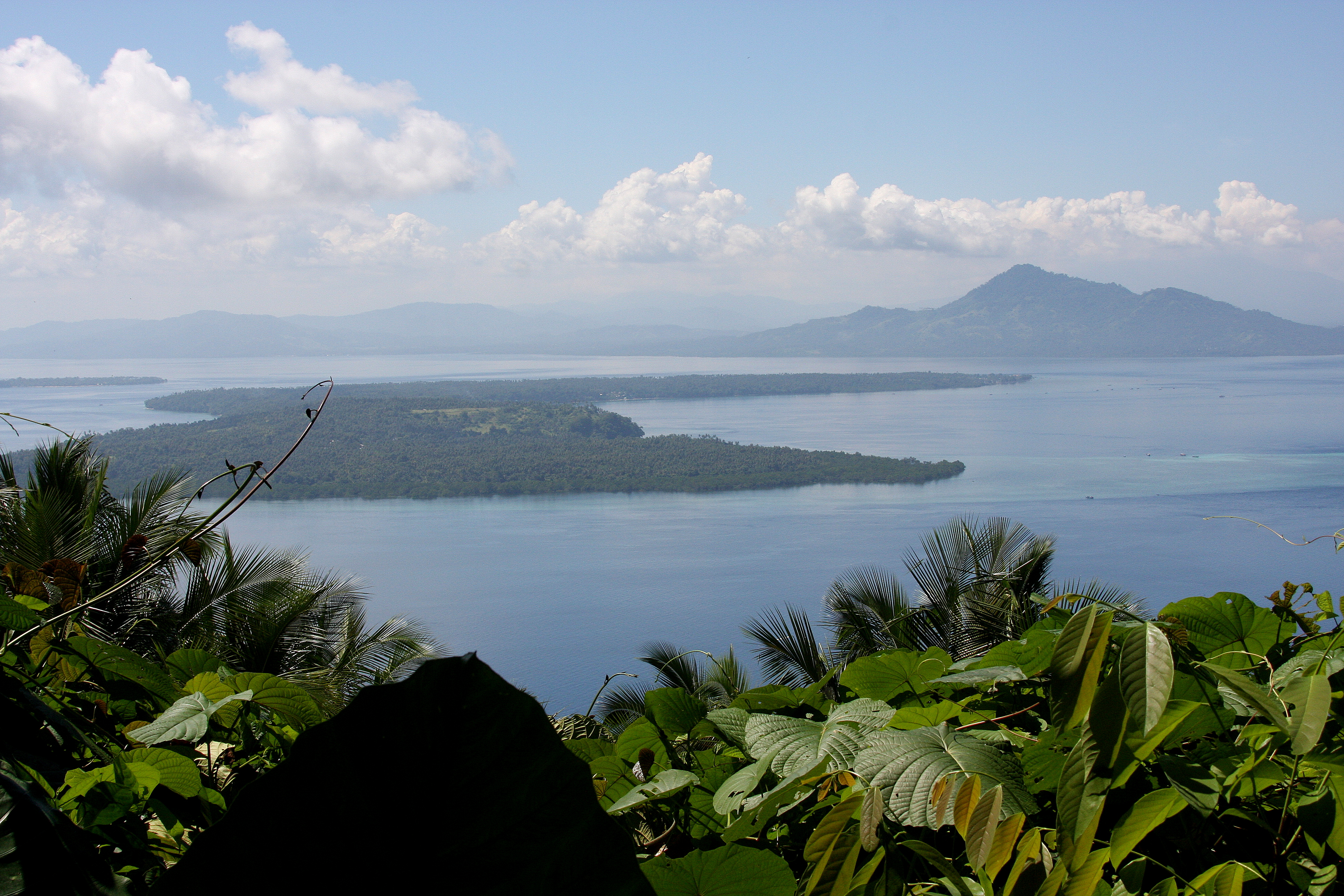
Bunaken Island seen from Manado Tua island

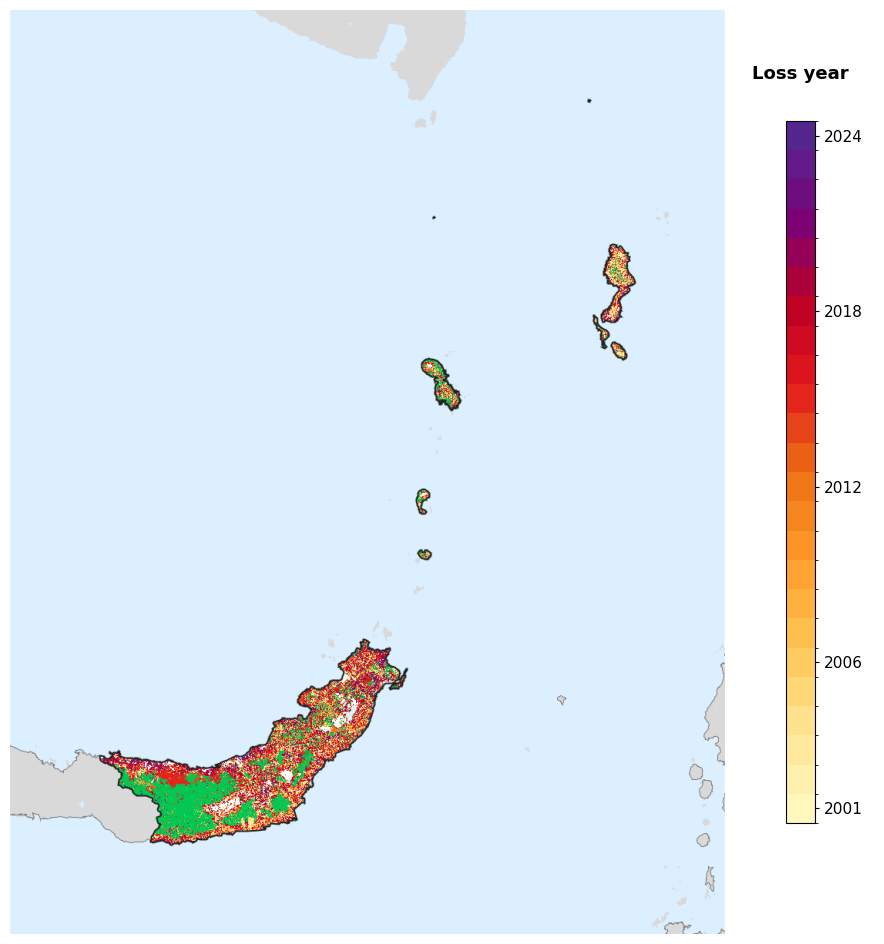
Tree-cover loss year in North Sulawesi, 2001-2024, from the Global Forest Change dataset.

The province of North Sulawesi is located in the northern peninsula of Sulawesi Island and is one of three provinces in Indonesia which has geoposition, geostrategy and geopolitical advantages and is located on the Pacific Rim. The other two provinces are North Sumatra and Aceh Special Region. Viewed from geographical location, North Sulawesi is located at 0.30–4.30 North Latitude (Lu) and 121–127 East Longitude (BT). The position of the peninsula stretches from east to west with the northernmost regions are the Sangihe and Talaud Islands. The archipelago is adjacent to neighboring Philippines. The area of North Sulawesi has boundaries:

North	Celebes Sea, Pacific Ocean and the Philippines
South	Gulf of Tomini
East	Maluku Sea, Maluku and North Maluku
West	Gorontalo

Most of the mainland area of North Sulawesi Province consists of mountains and hills interspersed by the valleys that make up the land. The mountains are located with a height above 1,000 m (3,300 ft) above sea level. Some mountains in North Sulawesi are Mount Klabat (1,895 m or 6,217 ft) in North Minahasa, Mount Lokon (1,579 m or 5,180 ft), Mount Mahawu (1,331 m or 4,367 ft) in Tomohon, Mount Soputan (1,789 m or 5,869 ft) in Southeast Minahasa, Mount Dua Saudara (1,468 m or 4,816 ft) in Bitung, Mount Awu (1,784 m or 5,853 ft), Mount Space (1,245 m or 4,085 ft), Mount Karangketang (1,320 m or 4,330 ft), Mount Dalage (1,165 m or 3,822 ft), in Sangihe and Talaud, Mount Ambang (1,689 m or 5,541 ft), Mount Gambula (1,954 m or 6,411 ft) and Mount Batu Balawan (1,970 m or 6,460 ft).

The lakes in this area potentially have economic value for the development of the field of tourism, irrigation and energy. The lakes are Lake Tondano with an area of 4,278 ha (10,570 acres) in Minahasa, Lake Moat covering 617 ha (1,520 acres) in East Bolaang Mongondow. In general, rivers are used for various purposes, among others, for irrigation as well as a source of electricity and drinking water sources. The rivers are Tondano River (40 km or 25 mi), Poigar River (54.2 km or 33.7 mi), Ranoyapo River (51.9 km or 32.2 mi), Talawaan River (34.8 km or 21.6 mi) in Minahasa. Other major rivers are located in Bolmong and Bolmut namely Dumoga River (87.2 km or 54.2 mi), Sangkub River (53.6 km or 33.3 mi), Ongkaw River (42.1 km or 26.2 mi).

Along the coast of North Sulawesi, both on the mainland coast and on the coast of the islands, there are several headlands (Indonesian: Tanjung) and bays (Indonesian: Teluk). Some of the prominent headlands are Tanjun Atep, Tanjung Pulisan, Tanjung Salimburung, Tanjung Kelapa in Minahasa. Tanjung Binta, Tanjung Dulang, Tanjung Flesko and Tanjung Tanango in Bolmong. While in Sangihe and Talaud namely Tanjung Binta, Tanjung Barurita, Tanjung Bulude, Tanjung Bunangkem, Tanjung Buwu and Tanjung Esang. The well-known bays of this region include Amurang Bay, Teluk Belang, Manado Bay, Kema Bay (Minahasa and Manado), Tombolata Bay, Taludaa Bay and Bolaang Telun (Bolmong), Manganitu Bay, Map Bay, Miulu Bay, Dago Bay and Ngalipeang Bay (Sangihe and Talaud). The cape and bay are known as places of trade and tourism.

The structure of the land in North Sulawesi in the form of Latosol covering 531,000 ha (1,310,000 acres) spread in several areas, among others: Tagulandang, Tamako, Manganitu, Kendahe, Tabukan Utara, Esang, Pineleng, Tomohon, Tombariri, Airmadidi, Kakas, Eris, Kombi, Tareran, Passi, Modayag, Pinolocian and Bolaang. Alluvial soil structure of 75,000 ha (190,000 acres) spread over several regions, including the Tabukan Tengah, Lirung, Likupang, Wori, Tombasian, Tenga, New Tompaso, Belang and Tondano.

Regosol soil structure covering 81,000 ha (200,000 acres) spread across several areas, among others, Klabat, Dua Saudara, Soputan and North Bitung, Dimembe, Airmadidi, Langowan, Tombasian, Tombatu and Tumpaan. Soil structure andosol of 15,000 ha (37,000 acres), spread across several areas between: in Tomohon, Kawangkoan, Tompaso, Langowan, and Modoinding. Apart from the structure of the land mentioned, others including soil types complex covering an area of approximately 76.5 percent of total area of North Sulawesi province so that the area was fertile for agriculture.

=== Flora and Fauna ===
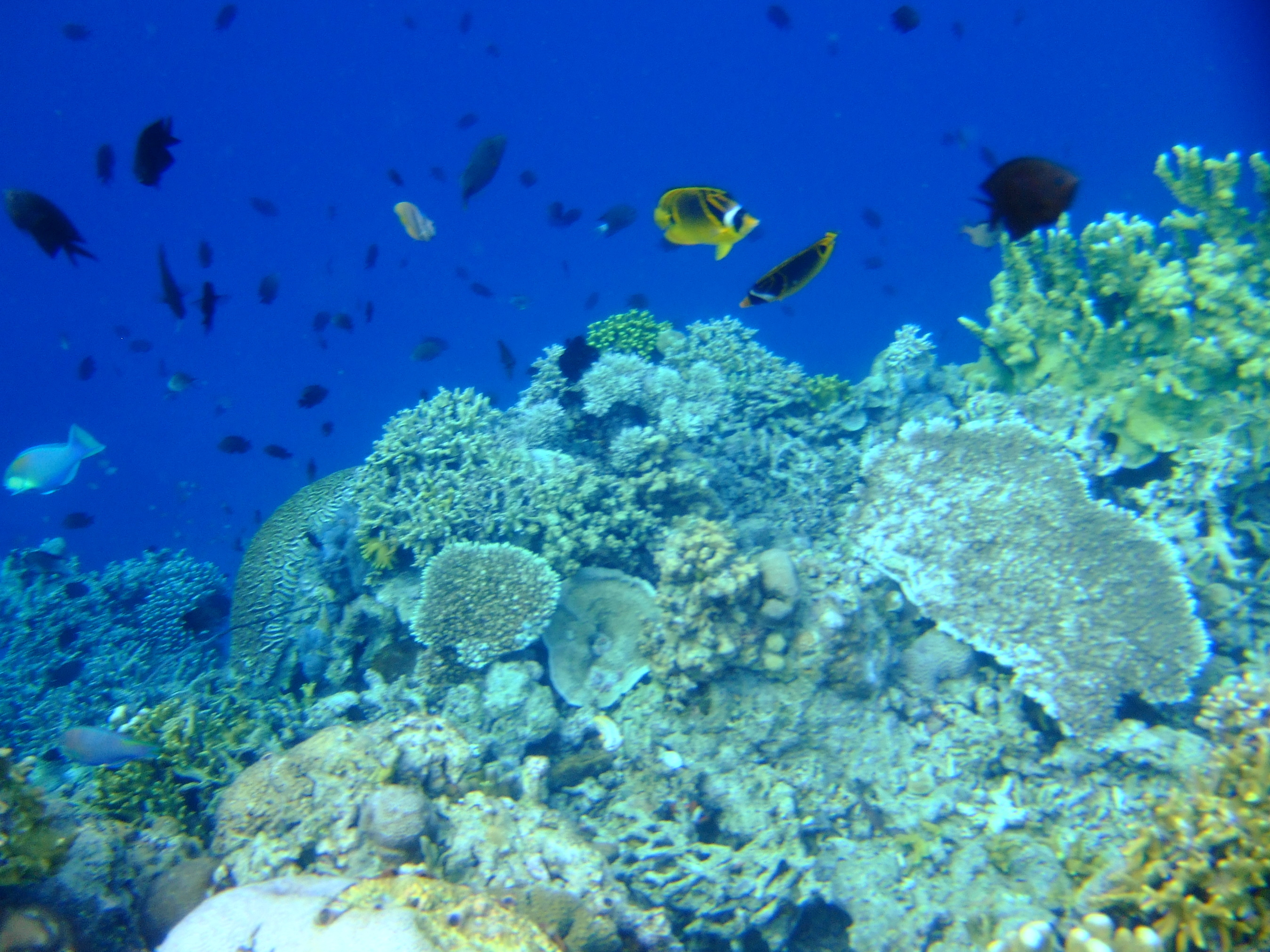
Bunaken National Park provides habitat to 390 species of coral as well as many fish, mollusk, reptile and marine mammal species.

In general, the varieties of flora and fauna in North Sulawesi are similar to those in other parts of Indonesia, except for some animals not found in other areas such as Deer, Maleo, Taong, Mini Tarsius Spectrum in Bitung City Nature Reserve And Coelacanth off the coast of Manado.

In the sea off North Sulawesi, there are several species of fish, coral, and plankton. Several types of famous marine fish and is one source of foreign exchange, among others: tuna, skipjack, yellow tail, lobsters, and others. The condition of flora can be said that the mainland of North Sulawesi partly dominated by forest. Forest cover ranges from 300 metres (980 ft) from sea level to mountain tops with various types of good quality timber, including ebony (wooden) iron wood, linggua wood, cempaka wood, wooden nantu, gopasa wood, meranti wood, There are also rattan, and various types of Dammar. In addition, there are many plantation crops such as coconut, nutmeg, and cloves.

== Demographics ==
Historical population
Year	Pop.	±%
1971	1,718,543	—
1980	2,115,384	+23.1%
1990	2,478,119	+17.1%
1995	2,649,093	+6.9%
2000	2,012,098	−24.0%
2010	2,270,596	+12.8%
2020	2,621,923	+15.5%
2025	2,721,440	+3.8%
Source: Badan Pusat Statistik 2026 and earlier versions. The reduction between 1995 and 2000 is due to the separation of Gorontalo from North Sulawesi.

The slowest growing regency was that of the Sangihe Islands. In 2010, about 68% were Christian (predominantly Protestant with a sizable Catholic minority), one of the few exceptions in the predominantly Muslim Indonesia, due to the prominent Dutch missionary activity during the colonial era. Also, because the Muslim-majority region of Gorontalo (then comprising a city and two regencies) was split off to form a new province on 5 December 2000. There are also Muslim, Hindu, and Buddhist minorities. The largest ethnic groups are the Minahasan in the north of the province and the Mongondow to the south. The province's chief city is Manado with a population of 460,430 people according to the mid 2025 official estimate.

=== Religion ===
Religion in North Sulawesi (2022)
1. Christianity (67.3%)
2. Islam (31.8%)
3. others (0.80%)

About two-thirds of the population of North Sulawesi adhere to Christianity, while nearly one-third follow Islam; smaller numbers follow Hinduism or other faiths. Christianity is the predominant religion in those districts and cities of the Islands and Minahasa, while Islam is the largest religion in the districts and cities in the Bolaang Mongondow. Most of the Christians in North Sulawesi adhere to Protestantism, while significant minority Roman Catholic communities also exist in Manado and Bitung. Chinese folk religions such as Confucianism and Taoism also exist, mostly concentrated in Manado, which has a significant Chinese population. Manado also has a Jewish community, numbering about 800. Currently, the only synagogue in Indonesia is located in Manado. As the Indonesian government only recognizes six religions and traditional faith, those who adhere to other religions or faiths can choose to put one of the officially recognized religions or traditional faith, or Kepercayaan Terhadap Tuhan Yang Maha Esa (Believe in One Almighty God) on their ID cards.

=== Ethnicity ===
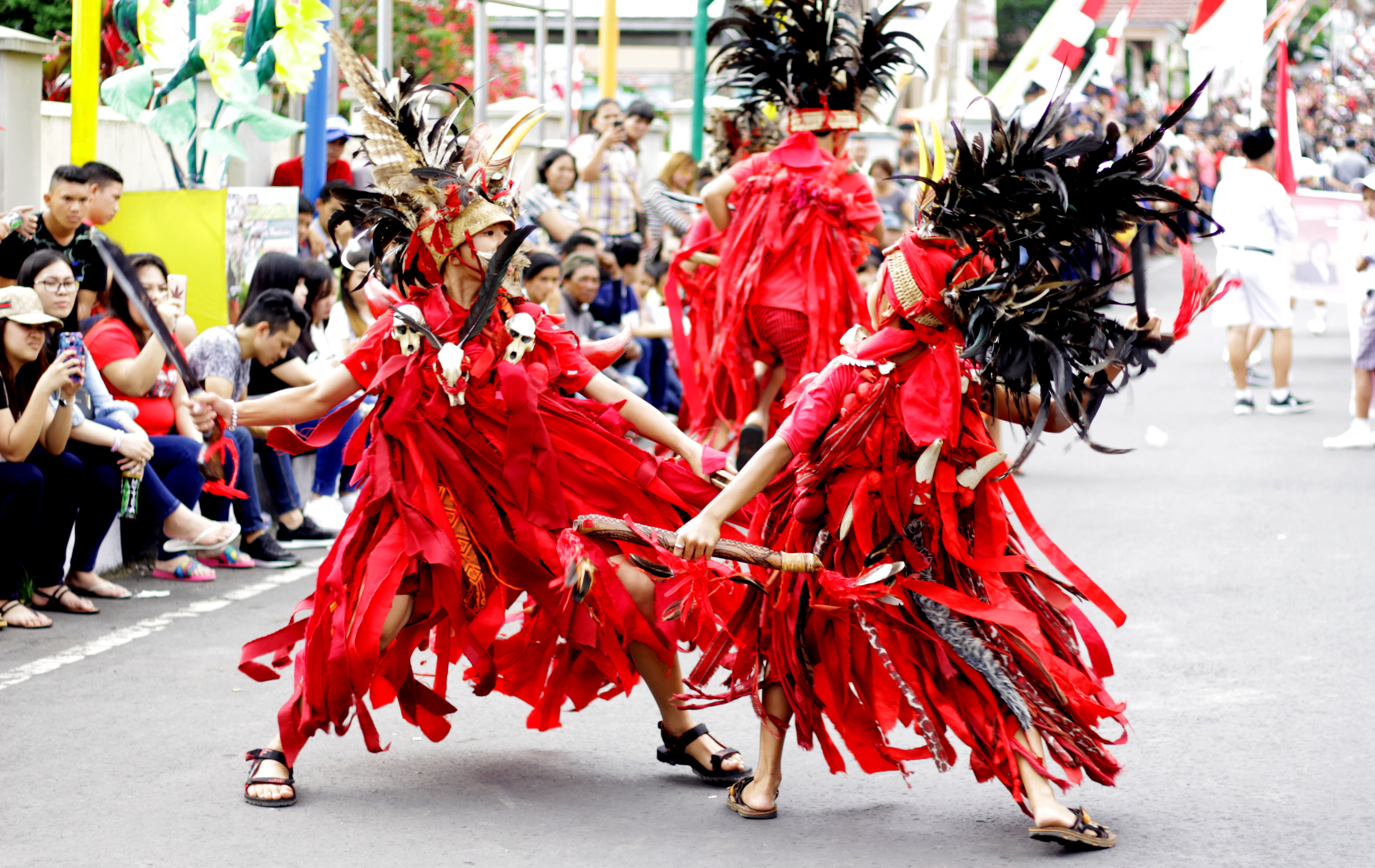
Minahasan people is the majority ethnic in North Sulawesi

The Minahasan is the dominant ethnic group in the province. They are the most populous ethnic group in the Minahasa Peninsula. They mostly lived in areas covering Bitung City, Manado City, Tomohon City, Minahasa Regency, North Minahasa Regency, South Minahasa Regency and Southeast Minahasa Regency. Other ethnic groups are the Bolaang Mongondow, Sangihe, Talaud and Siau. Ethnicity in North Sulawesi is more heterogeneous then other parts of Indonesia. The Minahasan and Bolaang Mongondow are spread almost throughout the region of North Sulawesi mainland. The Sangihe, Talaud and Siau mostly inhabit the Sangihe Islands, Talaud Island, and Lembeh Island, especially in coastal areas north, east and west of mainland North Sulawesi. The Bajau people are seafaring nomads who has migrated from the Sulu Archipelago in the Philippines, due to the conflict in Mindanao. They inhabits several coastal villages of North Sulawesi in the northern part of North Minahasa Regency.

In addition to the natives, North Sulawesi is also home to migrants. There are a significant Chinese population in North Sulawesi, especially around the city of Manado. The Chinese are also one of the first people to have contact with the local people before the Europeans came. According to the discovery of Chinese ancient letters in the Tompaso area, Minahasa shows the cultural interaction between the Chinese and Minahasa have existed since the Han dynasty. Most of the Chinese population in North Sulawesi are from the Hakka dialect group, while small numbers of Hokkien and Cantonese populations also exist.

Other ethnic groups such as the Javanese and the Sundanese also exist. They are mostly migrated from where they come from due to the Transmigration program enacted by the Dutch during the colonial era until the Suharto era. They generally live in urban areas, such as Manado and Bitung.

=== Language ===
Indonesian is the official language of the province, as well as of other parts of Indonesia. Official documents released by the provincial government as well as road signs are all written in Indonesian. However, Manado Malay is the lingua franca of the province. This language resembles Indonesian but with a distinct accent and dialect. Some of the vocabulary are derived from Dutch, Portuguese and other foreign languages. Manado Malay is often used for day-to-day communication between different ethnic groups. Minahasan languages are spoken by the Minahasan people. They are spread around the central and northern part of the province. In the Minahasa area, five (5) distinct languages are spoken: Tonsawang, Tontemboan, Toulour, Tonsea and Tombulu. To the south, the Mongondow language and the Gorontalo language are spoken. In the islands to the north which border the Philippines, the Visayan languages of Talaud, Sangihe and Siau are used by the local people.

Other languages spoken are Javanese, Sundanese and Balinese. They are mostly spoken by migrants coming from other parts of Indonesia. As Manado has a significant Chinese population, Hakka is also spoken by some Chinese people. Some other Chinese dialects are also spoken, such as Hokkien and Cantonese. English and Mandarin are widely understood in areas where there is a large tourism industry, such as the Bunaken National Park. Older generations tend to understand Dutch and Portuguese. People who lived in islands near the borders of the Philippines may understand Tagalog.

== Government and administrative divisions ==
=== Administrative divisions ===
Following the separation of Central Sulawesi as a separate province in 1964, North Sulawesi was originally composed of four regencies (Indonesian: kabupaten) – Minahasa, Sangihe Talaud, Bolaang Mongondow and Gorontalo – and the independent cities (Indonesian: kotamadya) of Manado (preexisting) and Gorontalo. The city of Bitung was separated from Minahasa Regency on 15 August 1990 to become a second independent city. On 4 October 1999 a new Boalemo Regency was created from part of Gorontalo Regency, but on 5 December 2000 both Gorontalo Regency and the new Boalemo Regency were split off from the province to become jointly a new Gorontalo Province. Further regencies were created from 2002 onwards - Sangihe Talaud on 10 April 2002 was split into separate regencies for the Sangihe Islands and for the Talaud Islands, while North Minahasa on 18 December 2002 was created from part of Minahasa Regency, and South Minahasa - and the independent city of Tomohon - on 25 February 2003 from further parts of Minahasa Regency. Further new regencies followed on 2 January 2007 - North Bolaang Mongondow and the independent city of Kotamobagu from parts of Bolaang Mongondow Regency, the Sitaro Islands (officially Kepulauan Siau Tagulandang Biaro - of which "Sitaro" is an acronym) from part of Sangihe Islands Regency, and Southeast Minahasa from part of South Minahasa Regency. Two further regencies were created on 24 June 2008 from further parts of Bolaang Mongondow Regency - East Bolaang Mongondow and South Bolaang Mongondow.

The province is thus now divided into eleven regencies (Indonesian: kabupaten) and four independent cities (Indonesian: kotamadya), listed below with their areas and their populations at the 2010 Census and 2020 Census, together with the official estimates as at mid 2025.

Kode Wilayah	Name of City or Regency	Area (km^{2})	Population			Capital	HDI 2014 Estimates
Kode Wilayah	Name of City or Regency	Area (km^{2})	Census 2010	Census 2020	Estimate mid 2025	Capital	HDI 2014 Estimates
71.03	Sangihe Islands Regency (Kepulauan Sangihe)	596.46	126,100	139,262	143,650	Tahuna	0.668 (Medium)
71.09	Sitaro Islands Regency (Kepulauan Siau Tagulandang Biaro)	215.61	63,801	71,817	74,450	Ondong (on Siau)	0.643 (Medium)
71.04	Talaud Islands Regency (Kepulauan Talaud)	1,009.74	83,434	94,521	99,280	Melonguane	0.665 (Medium)
	Northern (islands) sector	1,818.81	273,335	304,600	317,380		
71.71	Manado City	161.76	410,481	451,916	462,080		0.772 (High)
71.72	Bitung City	329.36	187,652	225,134	237,430		0.708 (High)
71.73	Tomohon City	169.06	91,553	100,587	104,820		0.735 (High)
71.02	Minahasa Regency	1,128.25	310,384	347,290	355,120	Tondano	0.727 (High)
71.05	South Minahasa Regency (Minahasa Selatan)	1,455.91	195,553	236,463	242,490	Amurang	0.683 (Medium)
71.06	North Minahasa Regency (Minahasa Utara)	992.98	188,904	224,993	235,630	Airmadidi	0.705 (High)
71.07	Southeast Minahasa Regency (Minahasa Tenggara)	752.79	100,443	116,323	121,520	Ratahan	0.678 (Medium)
	Eastern (Minahasa) sector	4,990.11	1,494,970	1,702,706	1,759,090		
71.74	Kotamobagu City	108.89	107,459	123,722	130,410		0.704 (High)
71.01	Bolaang Mongondow Regency	3,291.24	213,484	248,751	259,360	Lolak	0.645 (Medium)
71.08	North Bolaang Mongondow Regency (Bolaang Mongondow Utara)	1,643.86	70,693	83,112	88,270	Boroko	0.642 (Medium)
71.10	East Bolaang Mongondow Regency (Bolaang Mongondow Timur)	859.68	63,654	88,241	93,230	Tutuyan	0.631 (Medium)
71.11	South Bolaang Mongondow Regency (Bolaang Mongondow Selatan)	1,772.83	57,001	69,791	73,700	Molibagu	0.635 (Medium)
	Western (Bolaang Mongondow) sector	7,676.50	512,291	613,617	644,970		

Proposals have been under consideration since 2013 by the People's Representative Council (Dewan Perwakilan Rakyat or DPR) to create a separate Bolaang Mongondow Province. However, since 2013 the Indonesian Government have maintained a moratorium on the intended creation of new provinces, regencies and cities.

The province now forms one of Indonesia's 84 national electoral districts to elect members to the People's Representative Council. The North Sulawesi Electoral District consists of all of the 11 regencies and 4 cities in the province, and elects 6 members to the People's Representative Council.

== Coat of arms ==
The coat of arms of North Sulawesi is in the form of a blue pentagonal shield with a golden-yellow border. The pentagon and the five coconuts symbolize the Pancasila national ideology.

Inside the shield, there is a circular arrangement of 23 corn kernels, a coconut tree with nine fronds, six roots, and four shoots, altogether representing the province's establishment date of 23 September 1964. On the right side, a chain of 17 cloves and eight nutmegs, and on the left, 45 rice grains, symbolize the Proclamation of Indonesian Independence on 17 August 1945.

The depictions of coconut, clove, nutmeg, rice, and corn represent the major crops and economic staples of North Sulawesi.

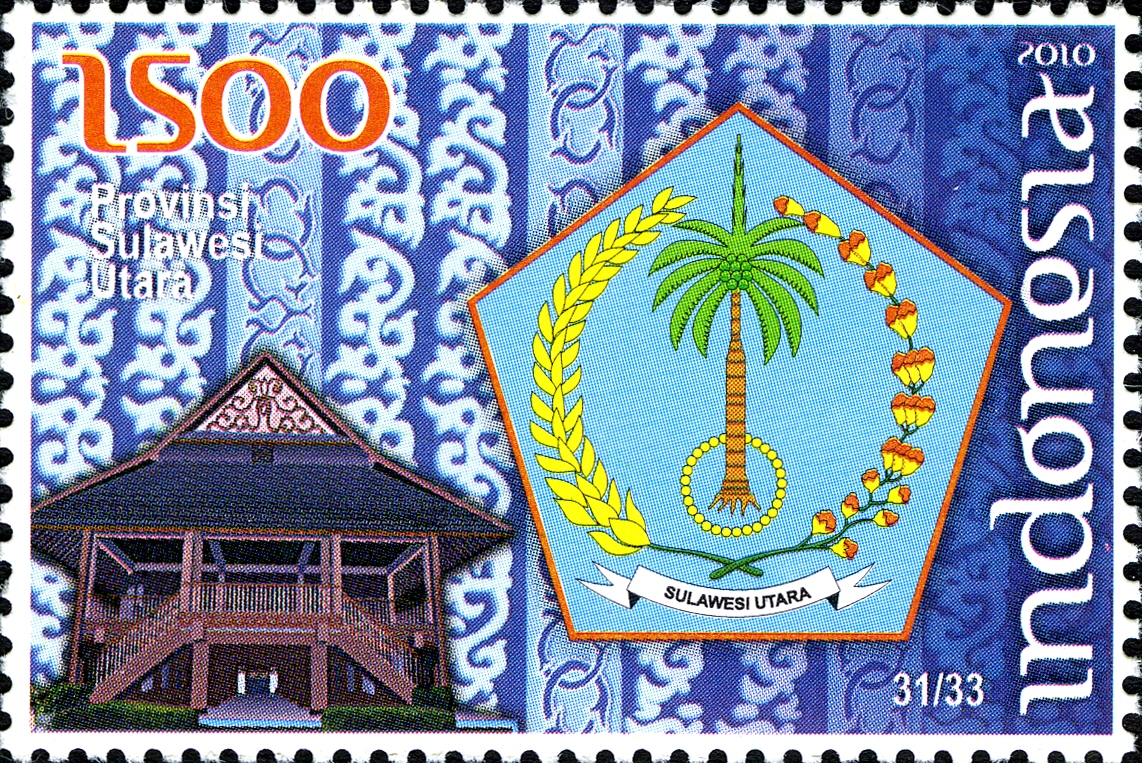
Coat of arms of North Sulawesi on a 2010 Indonesian stamp
