= Malalayang =

District of North Sulawesi

- District
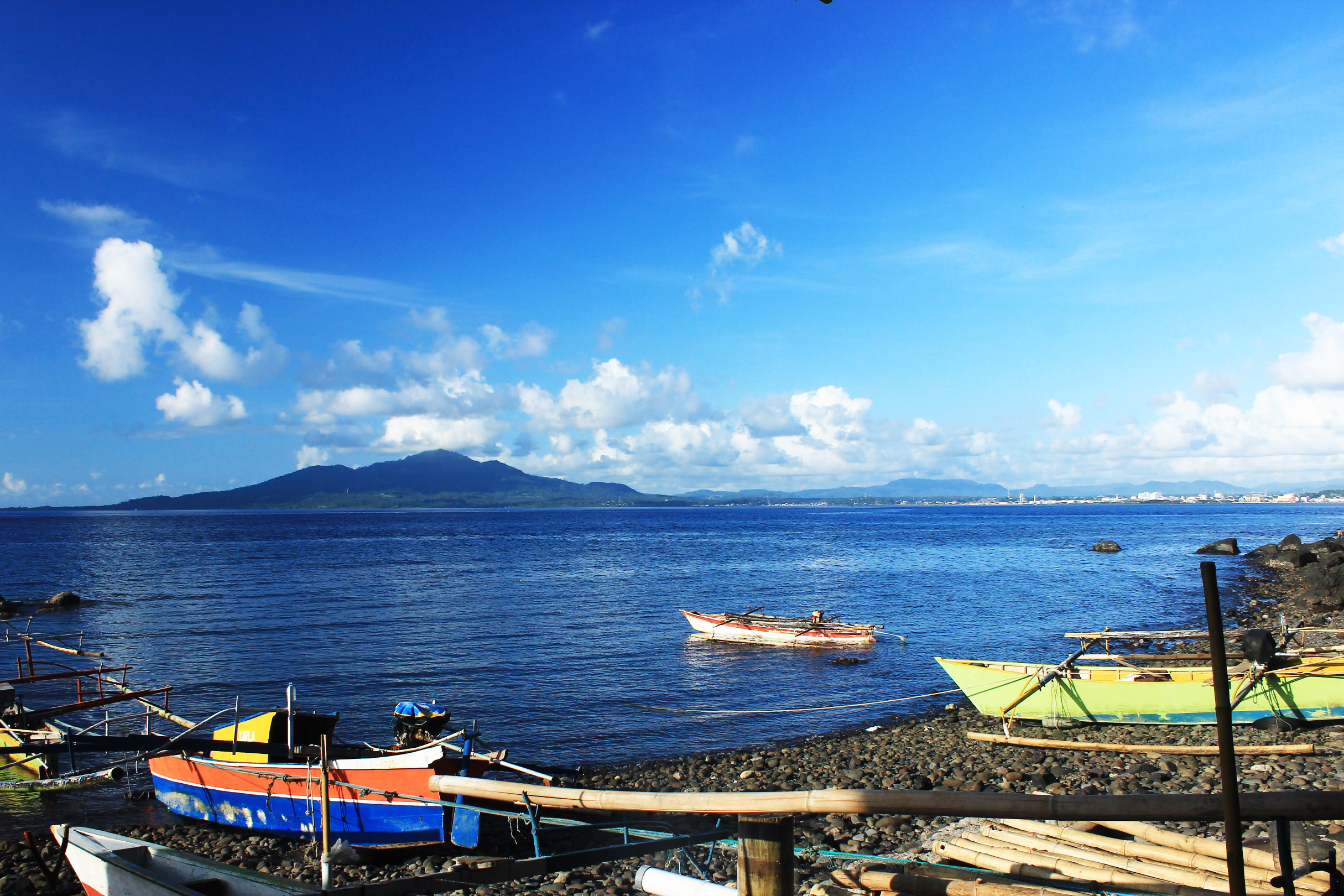
- The view of Mount Tumpa from Malalayang Beach
- Interactive map of Malalayang
- Location Malalayang (Indonesia)
- Coordinates: 1°27′17.4607″N 124°49′1.9322″E
- Country: Indonesia
- Province: North Sulawesi
- City: Manado
- District seat: Malalayang Satu

Area
  - Total: 17.12 km^{2} (6.61 sq mi)

Population (2020)
  - Total: 61,891
  - Density: 3,615/km^{2} (9,363/sq mi)
- Time zone: UTC+8 (ICT)
- Regional code: 71.71.09
- Villages: 9

Malalayang is a district in Manado, North Sulawesi, Indonesia. As of 2020, it was inhabited by 61,891 people, and has the total area of 17.12 km^{2}.

== Geography ==
Malalayang district is divided into 9 urban villages (kelurahan), namely:

- Malalayang Satu
- Bahu
- Kleak
- Batu Kota
- Malalayang Satu Timur
- Malalayang Satu Barat
- Malalayang Dua
- Winangun Satu
- Winangun Dua
