= Tombulu language =

Austronesian language spoken in Sulawesi, Indonesia

Tombulu
- Minahasa
- Native to: Indonesia
- Region: northern Sulawesi
- Native speakers: (60,000 cited 1981)
- Language family: Austronesian: Malayo-Polynesian; Philippine; Minahasan; North; Northeast; Tombulu
- Writing system: Latin; Malesung (historical)

Language codes
- ISO 639-3: tom
- Glottolog: tomb1243

Tombulu, also known as Minahasan language, is an Austronesian language of northern Sulawesi in Indonesia. It is a Minahasan language, a sub-group of the Philippine languages.

It is a local language of the Minahasa people spoken in the city of Tomohon and in the villages under the Kota Tomohon administration such as Rurukan, Pinaras, Kumelembuai, Woloan, and Tara-Tara. It is also spoken in the villages under the administration of the Minahasa Regency in the Tombulu district, Tombariri district, Mandolang district, Pineleng district, and two villages in the Sonder district, namely Rambunan and Sawangan.

== Distribution ==
Below are the list of villages that historically speaks bahasa Tombulu:

Kota Tomohon

- Sarongsong
- Uluindano
- Wailan
- Kayawu
- Woloan
- Tara-Tara
- Rurukan
- Pinaras
- Kumelembuai
- Pangolombian
- Lahendong
- Tondangow

Minahasa Regency

(Pineleng District)

- Sea
- Pineleng
- Warembungan
- Lotta
- Kali

(Tombulu District)

- Koka
- Tikela
- Sawangan
- Kamangta
- Tombuluan
- Kembes
- Rumengkor
- Suluan

(Mandolang District)

- Agotey
- Koha
- Tateli

(Tombariri District)

- Mokupa
- Tanawangko
- Senduk
- Poopoh
- Kumu
- Teling

(Sonder District)

- Sawangan
- Rambunan

Early settlers of Kapoya and Wuwuk village near Tumpaan traditionally were Tombulu speakers as they were part of an ancient Negri Sarongsong. There are also villages that are around Bolaang Mongondow Regency whose ancestors speaks Tombulu such as Rara'atean Village, whose ancestors are from Pangolombian, Kosio Village, whose ancestors are from Woloan, and Mariri Lama Village, whose ancestors are from Tombariri. All of these five villages no longer speaks Tombulu Language or aware that their ancestors originally speak Tombulu.

== Phonology ==
=== Consonants ===
		Labial	Alveolar	Post-alv./ Palatal	Velar	Glottal
Plosive/ Affricate	voiceless	p	t	tʃ	k	ʔ
Plosive/ Affricate	voiced	b	d	dʒ	ɡ	
Nasal		m	n		ŋ	
Fricative	voiceless		s			h
Fricative	voiced		z			
Lateral			l			
Trill			r	r̠		
Approximant		w		j		

=== Vowels ===
	Front	Central	Back
Close	i		u
Mid	e	ə	o
Open		a	

== Vocabulary ==
The Tombulu language is unique among the Minahasan languages in its pronunciation of the letter ⟨l⟩. In the other four Minahasan languages the letter ⟨l⟩ is pronounced as is, but in Tombulu it is pronounced like the ⟨th⟩ of the English language.

For example: kulo, meaning 'white', would be pronounced as kutho.

English	Tombulu
Yes	Ene
No	Zei'kan
North	Amian
South	Timu
West	Talikuran
East	Sendangan
Here	Wiya'i
There	Witi'i
This	Kenu
That	Nyitu
Hand	Lengan
Head	Ulu
Ear	Lunteng
Eye	Weweren
Stomach	Po'ot
Feet	A'e
Grandma	Nene
Grandfather	Tete
Mom	Ina
Dad	Ama
Me	Niaku
You	Niko
We	Kai
They	Sera
Him, her	Sia
Friend	Karia
Beautiful	Fasung
Female	Wewene
Male	Tuama
Kid (anak)	K'oki
Children (anak-anak)	Se k'oki
1 kid (1 anak)	Esa si k'oki
2 kids (2 anak)	Zua se k'oki
Female teacher	Enci
Male teacher	Engku
Bad	Lewo
Good	Le'os
Like	Pa'az
Water	Zano
Shower (mandi)	Lemele
Drink	Melep
School	Sekolah
Going to school	Sumikolah
Give	Wehape
Hungry	Maharem
Full (Stomach Full)	Wesu
Eat	Kuman
Breakfast	Sumokol
Fish	Seza
Good morning	Syambae
Good day	Tabea
Good night	Woondo Leos
When	Sawisa
Where	Wisa
Who	Sei
Go	Mange
Stop	Mento
Fast	Rorot
Slow	Ngerez
Fat	Rembuz
Skinny	Teren
Long	Lambot
Short	Poto
Add	Mawes
Subtract	Mina
Follow	Kumi'it
Sit down	Rumemez
Stand	Rumendai
Walk	Lampang
Walking	Lumampang
Let's go	Meimo
Until then	Teintu mo
Because	Pah'paan
But	Ta'an
Or	Ka'pa
Although	Ma'an
Very	totoz
Sky	Langit
Rain	Uzang
Yesterday	Kawi'i
Today	N'endo
Tonight	Wengindo mokan
Tomorrow	Sando
Face (Menghadap)	Sumaru
Sleep	Tekel
Sleeping	Tumekel
Falling Asleep	Matatandu
Have slept	Matetekelo
Rise	Sumaup
Ascend	Sumosor
Descend	Meros
Left	Kawi-i
Right	Kakan
God	Opo
Holy Spirit	Aseng Lengas

=== Numerals ===
1	Esa	11	Mapulu wo Esa	20	Zua nga pulu	100	Maatus	1000	Mariwu
2	Zua	12	Mapulu wo Zua	21	Zua nga pulu wo Esa	200	Zua nga'atus	2000	Zua nga'riwu
3	Tellu								
4	Epat								
5	Lima								
6	Enem								
7	Pitu								
8	Wallu								
9	Siou								
10	Mapulu								

== Phrases & examples ==
English	Tombulu
3479	Telu nga'riwu wo epat nga'atus wo pitu ngapulu wo siou
Good evening everyone	Wengi leos am peleng
How are you? all good?	Kura-mo? leos 'man?
What's your name?	Sei ngaranu?
What is your name?	Sei ngaranu?
What is his/her name?	Sei sia ngarana?
Where are you going?	Mange wisako?
What are you doing?	Ma'kura'ko?
Where are you from?	Wisako ameye?
Who is he/she?	Sei sia?
See you tomorrow	Sando mokan
Long live and stay healthy	Pakatuan wo pakalawizen
How much?	Pira?
Can I have some?	Wehane toyo?
The drinks are not here	Se elepan kampe wia
Thank you	Makapulu Leos
I love you	Ko'rara ateku
God of The Highest	Opo Wananatas
God Almighty	Opo Wailan Wangko

Penginaléi Ama’ nai
Ama nai im wana sorga,
Loozen nai un ngaranNu
Maye mo ung kakolanoanmu
Mamualimoma un paazmu ti kaayahaan mo ti sorga
Wehape nikai inendo kenu kanen nai takaz maawez
Wo ampunganne un sumala nai
Tanu nikai mahampung wia setou simala wia nikai
Wo tiakkan ipah wali nikai wana an pema'waa
Ta'an izoula wia nikai witu kalewo'a
Pahpaan niko uman simaka kakolanoan,
Wo ung kawasa,
wo ung kawangunan takaz kauze-uze na,
Ulit.

The Lord's Prayer
Our Father who art in heaven,
hallowed be thy name
Thy kingdom come.
Thy will be done on earth, as it is in heaven.
Give us this day our daily bread,
and forgive us our trespasses,
as we forgive those who trespass against us,
and lead us not into temptation,
but deliver us from evil.
For thine is the kingdom,
the power,
the glory forever,
Amen.

Pakaulitan Um Pa’emanan Rasuli
Ni aku é ma’éman wia Si Opo Empung, Si Ama’ ma'kawasa
si nimangun u langit wo un tana’.
Wo wia Si Yesus Kristus Si Oki’-Na in esa,
si niméipenu’tul witu um paaz Ni Roh Lenas,
nimatou wia si raraha Maria,
si nimendan un zéha wana am pa'perentaan ni Pontius Pilatus,
sinalib, nimaté wo mé ileweng,
an tumumpa witu u sinayauan,
witu un endo katelu, nimatou sumaup im wia sé tou nimailango,
a mangé witi kasendukan, a rumumez witu ung kakan Ni Opo Empung, Si Ama'-Na mahkawasa
wo witu mokan wo Sia méyé i mémo tumotoz ulit kaapa zei’kan um pa'wangunen né tou menou-noupé’ wo sé nimatemo.
Ni aku é ma’éman wia Si Aseng Lenas;
Um pa'esaan né tou ma’eman Si Opo Empung;
pa'ampungan a singkela’,
ung katouan sumaup né tou;
wo ung katou-touan takaz ing kauze-uze,
Ulit.

Affirmation of Faith – Apostles’ Creed
I believe in God, the Father Almighty,
Maker of heaven and earth,
and in Jesus Christ, His only Son, our Lord,
who was conceived by the Holy Ghost,
born of the Virgin Mary,
suffered under Pontius Pilate,
was crucified, dead and buried;
He descended into hell;
the third day He rose again from the dead;
He ascended into heaven, and sitteth on the right hand of God the Father Almighty;
from thence He shall come to judge the quick and the dead.
I believe in the Holy Ghost,
the holy catholic church,
the forgiveness of sins,
the resurrection of the body,
and the life everlasting.
Amen.

== Status ==
The Tombulu language is in critical need of revitalization. It is not being spoken as a first language in highly populated areas such as Tomohon, Pineleng, and Tanawangko. Traditionally Tombulu-speaking villages such as Woloan, Tara-Tara, Lolah, and Lemoh are not so today. The Board of Education of the Indonesian government has not offered any help either to the Tombulu language or any other local languages that are in decline. It is responsible for the removal of the Muatan Lokal from the daily curriculum of all grade schools across the nation in the past few years. Muatan Lokal, if available, is a daily class which most provinces in Indonesia use to teach the new generations the local languages and culture.

Tombulu is still spoken in villages such as Kayawu, Rurukan, Kumelembuai, Pinaras, Suluan, Kembes, Tombuluan, Rumengkor, Kali, Tondangow, Sawangan, and Rambunan all the way to the children. One Sunday on every month, Tombulu language is used in sermon in its local churches.

At the beginning of 2013, an Indonesian-Tombulu dictionary was first released. A New Testament version of the Bible in Tombulu language was released in November 2018.
