= Ratahan language =

Austronesian language spoken in Sulawesi, Indonesia

Ratahan
- Toratán
- Native to: Indonesia
- Region: Sulawesi
- Ethnicity: 30,000 (1989)
- Native speakers: (500 cited 1999)
- Language family: Austronesian: Malayo-Polynesian; Philippine; Sangiric; South; Ratahan

Language codes
- ISO 639-3: rth
- Glottolog: rata1244
- ELP: Ratahan

Ratahan (also Toratán) is an Austronesian language spoken in North Sulawesi, Indonesia. The language is mainly spoken in the Southeast Minahasa region.
