= Tombatu language =

Austronesian language spoken in Sulawesi, Indonesia

Tombatu
- Native to: Indonesia
- Region: Northern Sulawesi
- Native speakers: (20,000 cited 1981)
- Language family: Austronesian: Malayo-Polynesian; Philippine; Minahasan; Tombatu
- Writing system: Latin

Language codes
- ISO 639-3: tnw
- Glottolog: tons1239
- ELP: Tonsawang

Tombatu, also known as Tonsawang, is an Austronesian language of the northern tip of Sulawesi, Indonesia. It belongs to the Minahasan branch of the Philippine languages.

== Location ==
According to linguist James Sneddon, the language is "one of the most isolated languages", spoken in southeast Minahasa, while linguist Robert Blust situated it, along with the others of the Minahasan group, near Lake Tondano, "in the northern peninsula of Sulawesi".

== Orthography ==
=== Alphabet ===
- a – [ä]
- b – [b]
- e – [ə]
- è – [ɛ]
- g – [g]
- i – [i]
- j – [d͡ʒ]
- k – [k]
- l – [l]
- m – [m]
- n – [n]
- ng – [ŋ]
- o – [o̞]
- p – [p]
- r – [ɾ]
- s – [s]
- t – [t]
- u – [u]
- w – [w]
- ' – [ʔ]
