= Tonsea language =

Austronesian language spoken in Sulawesi, Indonesia

Tonsea
- Native to: Indonesia
- Region: northern Sulawesi
- Native speakers: (90,000 cited 1989)
- Language family: Austronesian: Malayo-Polynesian; Philippine; Minahasan; North; Northeast; Tonsea
- Writing system: Latin

Language codes
- ISO 639-3: txs
- Glottolog: tons1240

Tonsea (Tonsea') is an Austronesian language of the northern tip of Sulawesi, Indonesia. It belongs to the Minahasan branch of the Philippine languages.
