= Mongondow people =

Mongondow people Bolaang Mongondow
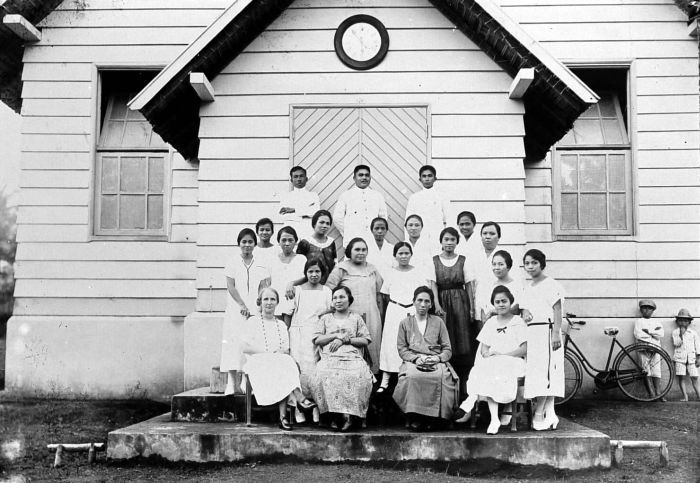
- A group of Mongondow women in North Sulawesi, pre-1943.

Total population
- 230,000 (2000)

Regions with significant populations
- Indonesia: North Sulawesi; Gorontalo; Philippines Malaysia

Languages
- Mongondow language, Manado Malay, Kaidipang language, Lolak language, Ponosakan language, Bolango language, Bintauna language, Indonesian language

Religion
- Sunni Islam 80%; Protestantism 10%; Roman Catholicism 10%

Related ethnic groups
- Gorontaloan people, Minahasan people, Sangirese people, Talaud people, Visayans, Maguindanao people, Tagalog people

The Mongondow or Bolaang Mongondow people are an Austronesian ethnic group native to the western part of North Sulawesi. The Mongondows are predominantly Muslim. They have traditionally been concentrated in the provinces of North Sulawesi and Gorontalo. This ethnic group used to be united by a single entity, the Kingdom of Bolaang Mongondow, which became the western regencies of North Sulawesi after the Indonesian independence.

== Etymology ==
The name Bolaang originated from the word Bolango or Balangon which means Sea. Bolaang or Golaang could also means "Bright" or "Exposed and Undark", while Mongondow originated from Momondow which means "Cries of Victory".

== History ==
=== The beginnings to the 8th and 9th century ===
The people of Mongondow believed that their ancestors originate from the offspring of Gumalangit and Tendeduata, as well as from Tumotoiboko and Tumotoibokat that were living on Mount Komasan, in today's Bintauna, North Bolaang Mongondow Regency. The descendants of both of their offspring later became the Mongondow people. The population of the Mongondows grew and spread beyond their native region such as Tudu in Lombagin, Buntalo, Pondoli’, Ginolantungan, Tudu in Passi, Tudu in Lolayan, Tudu in Sia’, Tudu in Bumbungon, Mahag, Siniow and so forth. The source of income for the Mongondows in those days include hunting, fishing, processing of sago, and harvesting of tuber in the jungle. In short, they have yet to learn farming in those days.

=== Development ===
In the 13th century, the Bogani (leaders of the groups of Mongondow community that occupied a certain area) became united to form a government rule for the Mongondow people called Bolaang. Bolaang itself means "the sea" (balangon) which identifies this kingdom as a maritime kingdom. The results of the meeting (bakid) of the Bogani came to an agreement to appoint Mokodoludut, a Bogani Molantud man as the first king (Punu') of the Bolaang kingdom. In the 16th century, after King Mokodompit departed to Siau Island in the years of power vacuum in Bolaang Mongondow Kingdom; moreover Prince Dodi Mokoagow, the strongest candidate to succeed the throne from King Mokodompit was killed by the Alfur people in an incident in the interior of Manado. In that period, the governance of the kingdom was taken over by a Mulantud Bogani man named Dou'. After the prince of King Mokodompit in Siau Island reached adulthood, he was appointed as the 7th King of Bolaang Mongondow Kingdom. The Abo (meaning, "prince") is called Tadohe / Sadohe, while his mother is a princess from the Kingdom of Siau. It was in his era that the governing system of the Bolaang Mongondow Kingdom was restored.

During the era of King Salmon Manoppo (1735–1764), there was a fierce conflict with the Dutch which ended with the King Salmon being captured and exiled to Cape of Good Hope, South Africa. This incident triggered protests and a great riot that was carried out by the Mongondow people of which the Bolaang kingdom belonged to. Finally, the Dutch returned the King of Bolaang and ever since then the name of Bolaang Kingdom has been added with the name of the ethnic group, the native of the Bolaang Kingdom to become Bolaang Mongondow to this present day. In 1901, administratively the area of Bolaang Mongondow Kingdom is part of the Bolaang Mongondow Subdivision ("Onderafdeling" in Dutch) which includes the Administrative Area ("landschap" in Dutch) of Bintauna, Bolaang Uki and Kaudipang Besar from Manado Administrative Division ("Afdeling" in Dutch).

The Bolaang Mongondow Kingdom officially ended on July 1, 1950, when the Majesty of King Tuang Henny Yusuf Cornelius Manoppo abdicated and made a declaration to join the Republic of Indonesia. Currently Mongondow is interpreted as a mountainous area and Bolaang as a coastal area. When Oemarudin Nini Mokoagow became regent of Bolaang Mongondow Regency (August 1966 to January 1976), a new village was created with the name Mongondow in Kotamobagu as a result of the redelineation from Motoboi Village.

== Sub-ethnics ==
The Mongondow people are made up of several sub-ethnicity that resides in North Sulawesi and Gorontalo such as:-

- Bolaang Mongondow people
- Bolaang Uki people
- Kaidipang Besar people
- Bintauna people
- Buhang people
- Korompot people
- Mokodompis people

== Language ==
The everyday Mongondow people use the Mongondow language, Bolango language and Bintauna language on a daily basis. Linguistically, these languages belong to the Greater Central Philippine languages branch (alongside Gorontalo). The Mongondow people also use Manado Malay as a form of communication with the other North Sulawesi people.

== Geographical redelineation ==
The region of the Bolaang Mongondow covers 50.3% of the area of North Sulawesi so much so that the Bolaang Mongondow government together with the community leaders, customary leaders and religious leaders had agreed to divide the region with the full support of the Bolaang Mongondow regent, the then Marlina Moha Siahaan.

With the full support of every community as well as the local Bolaang Mongondow government, the committee of the regional division managed to convince the central government and the Parliament that the Bolaang Mongondow region has officially divided into five regencies, namely:

- Bolaang Mongondow Regency
- Kotamobagu (city)
- North Bolaang Mongondow Regency
- East Bolaang Mongondow Regency
- South Bolaang Mongondow Regency
