= Kingdom of Bolaang Mongondow =

17th-century Indonesian kingdom

Kingdom of Bola'ang-Mongondow كسلطانن بولاءڠ موڠڬوندو
- 1670–1950
- Status: Independent kingdom (1670–1901); part of the Dutch East Indies (1901–1942); Empire of Japan (1942–1945); Republic of Indonesia (1945–1950)
- Capital: Bola'ang (1670); Kotobangon (1893)
- Common languages: Mongondow (official), Manado Malay, Lolak, Ponosakan, Bantik, Tonsawang, Tontemboan, and Bentenan
- Government: Monarchy
- Datu
  - 1670-1694: Datu Loloda Mokoagow
  - 1694-1730: Datu Yakobus Manoppo
  - 1735-1764: Datu Salomon Manoppo
  - 1893-1901: Datu Riedel Manuel Manoppo
  - 1901-1928: Datu Kornelius Manoppo II
  - 1928-1938: Datu Laurens Kornelius Manoppo
  - 1938–1950: Datu Henny Yusuf Kornelius Manoppo
- History
  - Ascension of Datu Loloda Mokoagow: 1670
  - Dissolution of kingdom: 1950
- Currency: Doit used in the shore settlements, in the inlands the barter system was used
Preceded by	Succeeded by
Chiefdom of Mongondow	Indonesia
- Today part of: Indonesia

The Kingdom of Bolaang Mongondow, previously known as Kingdom of Bola'ang, was a state that ruled over the majority of the area of the present-day Bolaang-Mongondow regencies in the North Sulawesi province of Indonesia, excluding the present North Bolaang Mongondow Regency, which was a territory that was ruled by smaller kingdoms of Bintauna and Kaidipang.

The kingdom was founded in 1670 AD by a Mongondow prince Datu Loloda Mokoagow (died 1695). He was the son of the paramount chief of Mongondow, Tadohe (1600–1670), seated in Kotobangon in the heartland of the Mongondow plateau, while the prince established himself at the port settlement of Bola'ang and went to conquer many of the northern shores and inland settlements of the present-day Minahasa regencies of northern Celebes peninsula. When he succeeded his father in 1670, he titled himself datu (king) instead of the traditional Mongondow title of punu (paramount chief). This marked the beginning of the Kingdom of Bola'ang.

At its peak, the kingdom covered Bola'ang (present-day Bola'ang village), the Mongondow plateau (the present-day Kotamobagu city and its vicinity), Kotabunan (the present-day Kotabunan of Bola'ang Mongondow Timur regency), Mandolang port (the present-day Belang in the Southeast Minahasa Regency), the banks of Ranoyapo river including Tumpa'an, Tareran, Tanawangko, and Tateli (the present-day South Minahasa Regency), Umuda (the present-day town of Amurang), Manarow (the present-day Manado-Tua island), and Wenang (the present-day Manado city).

However, on September 21, 1694, a contractual agreement to establish new territorial borders was signed between the Kingdom of Bola'ang and the newly unified federation of Minahasan tribes, backed by the Dutch. The borders were established along the Poigar river as the northern border and along the Buyat river as its southerly counterpart. The border thus divided the west side territory for Bola'ang and the east side territory for the Minahasan people, which made the kingdom of Bola'ang lose all of its territories and subjects on the east side of the border. Thus it left only the Mongondow plateau and the adjacent Kotabunan as the territory of the Bola'ang, hence the name Kingdom of Bola'ang-Mongondow was used thereafter.

== Etymology ==
The name "Bola'ang" came from the name of the settlement where the Datus ruled the realm from. Bola'ang alternatively spelled Gola'ang is an Old-Mongondow word meaning "enlightened due to a glimpse of sunlight pierce through the canopy of dense forest". "Mongondow" came from the name used to refer to the various groups of people living in the plateau of the same name. The people of the plateau got their name from their custom of momondow, which is "shouting signal words to communicate to peers in the jungle, or shouting a victorious battlecry".

== Culture and society ==
=== Paloko-Kinalang ===
The most basic class system of Mongondow society formed at the time of chief Damopoli'i (1480). It consist of two classes, bounded by the most sacred vows (odi-odi):

Rulers (Kinalang)
Class of chiefs and their relatives. They had the right of absolute obedience from the commoners, while they are required to improve all aspects of the commoners' welfare.

Commoners (Paloko)

The commoners were required to give absolute obedience to the ruling class (even required to mourn for their death for days), while they had the right that their welfare be improved.

=== Six class system ===
The social class system was reformulated by chief Tadohe at the beginning of his reign.

Elites
First Class: Mododatu (king's closest relatives, the males might be chosen as heir to the throne)
Second Class: Kohongian (king's relatives, but the males might not be chosen as heir to the throne)

Commoners
Third Class: Simpal (bureaucrats, administrators)
Fourth Class: Nonow (common people, workers and farmers)

Slaves
Fifth Class: Tahig (guards, errands)
Sixth Class: Yobuat (lowest slaves)
