= Glottalization =

Phonetic process

Glottalized

◌ˀ

Encoding
- Entity (decimal): &#704;
- Unicode (hex): U+02C0
Image

Glottalization is the complete or partial closure of the glottis during the articulation of another sound. Glottalization of vowels and other sonorants is most often realized as creaky voice (partial closure). Glottalization of obstruent consonants usually involves complete closure of the glottis; another way to describe this phenomenon is to say that a glottal stop is made simultaneously with another consonant. In certain cases, the glottal stop can even wholly replace the voiceless consonant. The term 'glottalized' is also used for ejective and implosive consonants; see glottalic consonant for examples.

Most often, glottalization is transcribed with a superscript glottal stop (letter) ⟨ˀ⟩. There are two other ways to represent glottalization of sonorants in the IPA: (a) the same way as ejectives, with an apostrophe; or (b) with the under-tilde for creaky voice. For example, the Yapese word for "sick" with a glottalized m could be transcribed as either [mʼaar] or [m̰aar]. (In some typefaces, the apostrophe will occur above the m.)

== Types ==
Glottalization varies along three parameters, all of which are continua. The degree of glottalization varies from none (modal voice, [d]) through stiff voice ([d̬]) and creaky voice ([d̰]) to full glottal closure (glottal reinforcement or glottal replacement, described below). The timing also varies, from a simultaneous single segment [d̰] to an onset or coda such as [ˀd] or [dˀ] to a sequence such as [ʔd] or [dʔ]. Full or partial closure of the glottis also allows glottalic airstream mechanisms to operate, producing ejective or implosive consonants; implosives may themselves have modal, stiff, or creaky voice. It is not always clear from linguistic descriptions if a language has a series of light ejectives or voiceless consonants with glottal reinforcement, or similarly if it has a series of light implosives or voiced consonants with glottal reinforcement. (Note: See Vietnamese phonology) The airstream parameter is only known to be relevant to obstruents, but the first two are involved with both obstruents and sonorants, including vowels.

== Glottal replacement ==
Glottal replacement, or glottaling, is when a phoneme is completely substituted by a glottal stop [ʔ]. This is very common in British English dialects such as Cockney and Estuary English. In those dialects, the glottal stop is an allophone of /p, t, k/ word-finally and when followed by an unstressed vowel (including syllabic /l, m, n/) in a post-stress syllable. 'Water' can be pronounced [ˈwɔːʔə] – the glottal stop has superseded the 't' sound. Other examples include "city" [ˈsɪʔi], "bottle" [ˈbɒʔo], "Britain" [ˈbʋɪʔən], "seniority" [sɪiniˈɒʋəʔi]. In some consonant clusters, glottal replacement of /t/ is common even among speakers of RP.

Geordie English has a unique form of glottalization involving glottal reinforcement of /p, t, k/, for example in "happy", "matter" and "lucky". Those sounds between vowels are pronounced simultaneously with a glottal stop represented in IPA as ⟨p͡ʔ⟩, ⟨t͡ʔ⟩ and ⟨k͡ʔ⟩⟩.

Glottal replacement occurs in Indonesian in which syllable final /k/ is produced as a glottal stop. In all Gorontalic languages except Buol and Kaidipang, *k was replaced by a glottal stop, even word-initially, except when it followed *ŋ (*kayu → Gorontalo ayu, *konuku → olu'u). In Hawaiian, the glottal stop is reconstructed to have come from other Proto-Polynesian consonants. The following table displays the shift /k/ → /ʔ/, as well as the one /t/ → /k/:

Gloss	man	sea	taboo	octopus	canoe
Tongan	[taŋata]	[tahi]	[tapu]	[feke]	[vaka]
Samoan	[taŋata]	[tai]	[tapu]	[feʔe]	[vaʔa]
Māori	[taŋata]	[tai]	[tapʉ]	[ɸeke]	[waka]
Rapanui	[taŋata]	[tai]	[tapu]	[heke]	[vaka]
Rarotongan	[taŋata]	[tai]	[tapu]	[ʔeke]	[vaka]
Hawaiian	[kanaka]	[kai]	[kapu]	[heʔe]	[waʔa]

Glottal replacement is not purely a feature of consonants. Yaneshaʼ has three vowel qualities (/a/, /e/ and /o/) that have phonemic contrasts between short, long, and "laryngeal" or glottalized forms. While the latter generally consists of creaky phonation, there is some allophony involved. In pre-final contexts, a variation occurs (especially before voiced consonants) ranging from creaky phonation throughout the vowel to a sequence of a vowel, glottal stop, and a slightly rearticulated vowel: /maˀˈnʲoʐ/ ('deer') → [maʔa̯ˈnʲoʂ].

== Glottal reinforcement ==
Glottalized

ˀ◌

Pre-glottalization, or glottal reinforcement, is when a phoneme is accompanied (either sequentially or simultaneously) by a [ʔ] or a [ˀ].

=== English ===
This is common in some varieties of English, RP included; /t/ and /tʃ/ are the most affected, but /p/ and /k/ also regularly show pre-glottalization. In the English dialects exhibiting pre-glottalization, the consonants in question are usually glottalized in the coda position: "what" [ˈwɒʔt], "fiction" [ˈfɪʔkʃən], "milkman" [ˈmɪɫʔkmən], "opera" [ˈɒʔpɹə]. To a certain extent, some varieties of English have free variation between glottal replacement and glottal reinforcement.

=== Low Saxon ===
Glottal reinforcement is present in some varieties of Low Saxon, most notably in Twents. It usually denotes syllable reduction and can be heard before plosives: Dat düt et 'that does it, that is the case' can in its most extreme form be reduced to [dʌʔˈdʏʔt].

== See also ==
- Ejective consonant
- Glottalic consonant
- Guttural
- Implosive consonant
- Stød
- T-glottalization

== Bibliography ==
Glottalization

- Andrésen, B.S. (1968). Pre-glottalization in English Standard Pronunciation. Norwegian Studies in English. Vol. 13. Oslo: Norwegian University Press. LCCN 68-21916. OCLC 442220.
- Christopherson, P. (1952). "The glottal stop in English". English Studies. 33 (1–6): 156–163. doi:10.1080/00138385208596879.
- Fast, Peter W. (1953). "Amuesha (Arawak) Phonemes". International Journal of American Linguistics. 19 (3): 191–194. doi:10.1086/464218. S2CID 145692545.
- Higginbottom, E. (1964). "Glottal reinforcement in English". Transactions of the Philological Society. 63: 129–142. doi:10.1111/j.1467-968X.1964.tb01010.x.
- Ladefoged, Peter; Maddieson, Ian (1996). The Sounds of the World's Languages. Oxford: Blackwell. ISBN 0-631-19815-6.
- O'Connor, J.D. (1952). "RP and the reinforcing glottal stop". English Studies. 33: 214–218.
- Roach, P. (1973). "Glottalization of English /p/, /t/, /k/ and /tʃ/: a reexamination". Journal of the International Phonetic Association. 3 (1): 10–21. doi:10.1017/S0025100300000633. S2CID 145061712.
- Sullivan, A.E. (1992). Sound Change in Progress: a study of phonological change and lexical diffusion, with reference to glottalization and r-loss in the speech of some Exeter schoolchildren. Exeter University Press. ISBN 085989374X.

English accents

- Foulkes, P.; Docherty, G., eds. (1999). Urban Voices: accent studies in the British Isles. London: Arnold. ISBN 0-340-70608-2.
- Hughes, A.; Trudgill, P. (2005). English Accents and Dialects (4th ed.). London: Arnold. ISBN 0-340-88718-4.
- Wells, John C. (1982). Accents of English. Vol. 1: An Introduction (pp. i–xx, 1–278), Vol. 2: The British Isles (pp. i–xx, 279–466), Vol. 3: Beyond the British Isles (pp. i–xx, 467–674). Cambridge University Press. doi:10.1017/CBO9780511611759, doi:10.1017/CBO9780511611766. ISBN 0-52129719-2, 0-52128540-2, 0-52128541-0.
