= Bonda =

Bonda may refer to:

== People ==
- Bonda people, are a Munda ethnic group in Odisha, India
- Suwawa (Bonda) people, an ethnic group in Gorontalo, Indonesia
- Bonda language, spoken by Bonda people in Odisha, India
- Suwawa (Bonda) language, spoken by Suwawa people in Gorontalo, Indonesia
- Bonda Mani, an Indian actor
- Bonda Umamaheswara Rao, an Indian politician

== Other uses ==
- Bonda (snack), is a deep-fried South Indian potato snack
- Bonda mastiff bat, species of bat from central, America
- Bonda script, the script used to write the Suwawa language in Indonesia
- Bondara, the UK’s largest adult retailers
