= Mongondow =

Mongondow may be,

- Mongondow people, a people of Sulawesi, Indonesia
- Mongondow language, their Austronesian language

== See also ==
- Kingdom of Bolaang Mongondow
- Bolaang Mongondow Regency
