= Gorontalo people =

Ethnic group in Indonesia

Gorontalo People Gorontalese
Tawu Lo Hulontalo
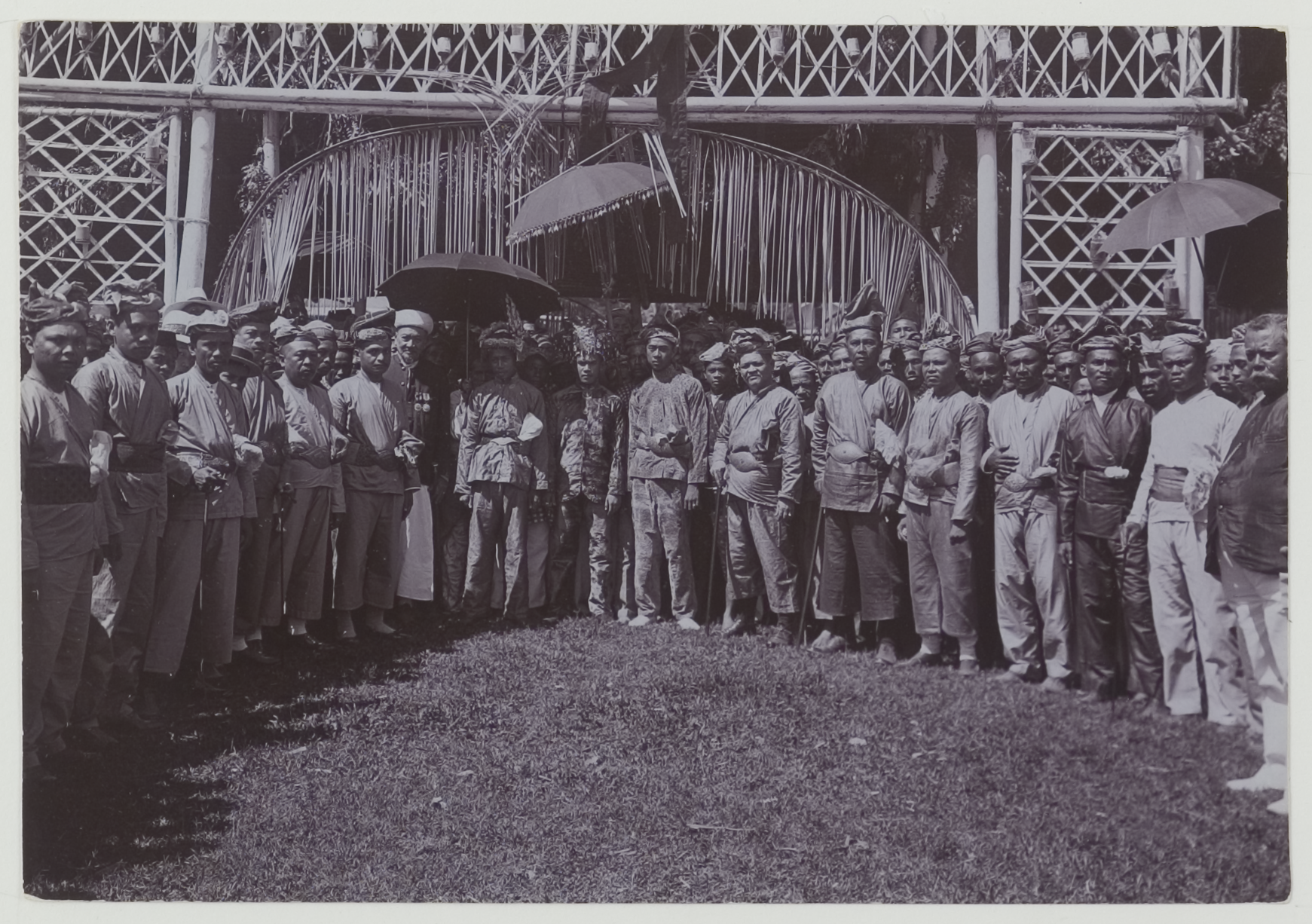
- Photo of the "Pemangku Adat" or Gorontalo Sultanate Officials

Total population
- 1,251,494 (2010 Census)

Regions with significant populations
- Indonesia
- Gorontalo: 925,626
- North Sulawesi: 187,163
- Central Sulawesi: 105,151

Languages
- Native; Gorontalo; Also; Gorontalo Malay • Manado Malay • Indonesian

Religion
- Predominantly Islam

Related ethnic groups
- Pohali; Mongondow; Minahasan; Sangirese; Talaud; Visayans; Maguindanao; Tagalogs; other Austronesian peoples

Gorontalo people, also known as Gorontalese are a native ethnic group and the most populous ethnicity in the northern part of Sulawesi. The Gorontalo people have traditionally been concentrated in the provinces of Gorontalo, North Sulawesi, and the northern part of Central Sulawesi.

The Gorontalo people are predominantly Muslim. Their native language is the Gorontalo language.

== Etymology ==
The name Gorontalo is the Indonesian form of the endonym Hulontalo. Several proposals exist for the etymology of the term, such as:

- Hulontalangi, which means a "Noble Valley". The Hulontalangi word comes from two syllables, "Huluntu" which means "Valley" and "Langi" which means "Noble". Another meaning of the word "Hulontalangi" is "Inundated Land". It can be interpreted as "Land that is inundated by water" according to the Gorontalese folktale from generation to generation.
- Huidu Totolu or "Goenong Tellu", which means "Three Mountains". There are three ancient mountains on the Gorontalo peninsula, which are Mount Malenggalila, Mount Tilonggabila (turned into Tilongkabila) and one more mountain that is unnamed. In many Portuguese and Dutch literatures (as well as in some map drawings), the word Goenong-Tello is also used more to describe this region.
- Pohulatalo or Pogulatalo, which means "Place of Waiting". The word "Pogulatalo" gradually changed to "Hulatalo", then become Gorontalo.
- Hulontalo or Holontalo, used by the Dutch to recognize the local sultanate in this region as well as an adaptation of the name of the Kingdom of Hulontalo (Gorontalo Sultanate) in the past.

== History ==
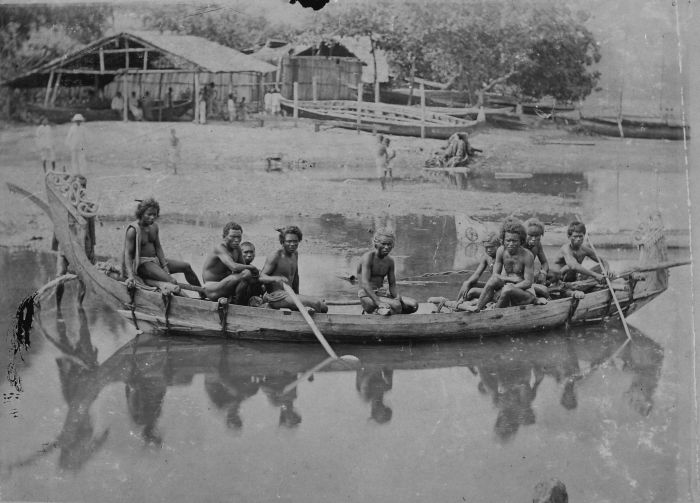
A group of men from Gorontalo in a prahu, circa 1895-1905.

=== Origins ===
The origins of the Gorontalo people is uncertain. There are two Southeast Asian migration theories, with the first theory stating that the population of Southeast Asian originally came from the east, and then inhabited in Sulawesi. While the second theory explains that the human migration began from Taiwan and arrived in Sulawesi through the Philippines. Linguistically, Gorontalo people share the same origins with other Austronesian people of the Philippine Islands and North Sulawesi islands.

There is a Gorontalo legend that tells a story that they are the descendants of Hulontalangi, or the people that came from the skies and reside on Mount Tilongkabila, Bone Bolango Regency. The name Hulontalangi then became Hulontalo and Gorontalo.

=== Prehistoric period ===
According to legend, the first Gorontalo kingdom emerged at the beginning of the 2nd millennium BC. Gorontalo is believed to have been inhabited by humans since prehistoric times. The Oluhuta site in Bone Bolango Regency is an archaeology site which provides information about the tombs of previous communities that were estimated to have lived around 2000–4000 years ago.

=== Gorontalo kingdoms ===
The establishment of the Gorontalo region has been estimated to have occurred 400 years ago. Gorontalo is one of the places that is recognized for the spreading of Islam in East Indonesia besides Ternate and Bone state. By 1525, when the Portuguese arrived at North Sulawesi, Islam had already been widely spread among them during the rule of King Amay; with the Gorontalo lands divided between the Muslim states of Gorontalo, Limboto, Suwawa, Boalemo and Atinggola. Gorontalo then developed to become the center of education and trade in North Sulawesi. The city of the Gorontalo Kingdom first began in Hulawa village beside the Bolango River. Before the arrival of the Europeans, the kingdoms in Gorontalo had already adhered to a family bonding system called pohala'a, which is still found today.

=== Dutch East India Company period ===
Prior to the arrival of the Europeans, the Gorontalo kingdoms were under the influence of the Ternate Sultanate. Gorontalo came under the administrative region of the Dutch East India Company with the formation of Gorontalo Regency as a result of a treaty between Governor Ternate Robertus Patbrugge and the Gorontalo king.

During the Dutch East Indies period, Gorontalo people began to emigrate out of Gorontalo region in the 18th century; to other regions such as Ternate, Ambon Island, Buol Island, Banggai Island and Minahasa Regency, in order to avoid the forced labor system that was enforced by the Dutch East Indies government in Gorontalo at that time.

There were military-political alliance, which by the end of the 19th century they were fully colonized by the Dutch East Indies. In 1950 Gorontalo as a part of State of East Indonesia rejoined Indonesia.

=== Formation of Gorontalo province ===
Before Gorontalo became a province of its own, the Gorontalo region was part of the North Sulawesi Province with a regency status. However on 5 December 2000, in accordance to Article 38 Year 2000, Gorontalo Regency became a separate province with the name Gorontalo Province. The Ministry of Home Affairs at that time, Soerjadi Soedirdja officiate the Gorontalo Province and appointed Tursandi Alwi as the governor. A year later, Fadel Muhammad was elected as the first governor of Gorontalo Province.

== Language ==
The Gorontalo language is a member of the Austronesian language family. Apart from Gorontalo, there are several languages that are similar which are considered by linguists as Gorontalo dialects, including Suwawa, Atinggola, Limboto, Kwandang, Tilamuta, and Sumawata. Gorontalo is widely used in contemporary society due to the influence of the Gorontalo Kingdom that was once established in the region. Atinggola is used by the Atinggola community situated on the northern coast of Gorontalo.

Today, Gorontalo itself have gone through assimilation with Manado Malay, which is also widely spoken by Gorontaloans. In terms of linguistics, Gorontalo is related to other languages from North Sulawesi and the Philippines. Gorontalo along with Mongondow are classified by linguists as being part of the Gorontalo–Mongondow languages, which are part of the wider Philippine languages grouping. The Philippine languages, which are linguistically close to Gorontalo, include Tagalog, Cebuano, Hiligaynon, Bikol, and Waray. Today, Gorontalo is more often written using the Latin alphabet; however, the use of Gorontalo as a written language is limited. In schools for education, the media, and official documents, Indonesian is more used.

== Religion ==
Most Gorontaloans claim adherence to the Islamic faith. By the early 16th century, most Gorontaloan adopted Islam via Ternate influence. There are numerous traditional customs of the Gorontalo people that also contain Islamic influences.

Customs are regarded as an honor, norms and even as a guideline to implementing governance for the Gorontalo community. This is attributed to the expression of "Adat Bersendi Sara" and "Sara Bersendi Kitabullah". The meaning of these sayings is that customs (adat) are implemented based on rules (sara), while these rules must be based on the Islamic holy book, the Quran. Therefore it is understood that the lives of the Gorontalo people are full of religious values and noble values.

During the end of Ramadan, the people conducted Tombbilotohe; a cultural celebration with oil lamps, which is lit around mosques and settlements.

== Culture ==
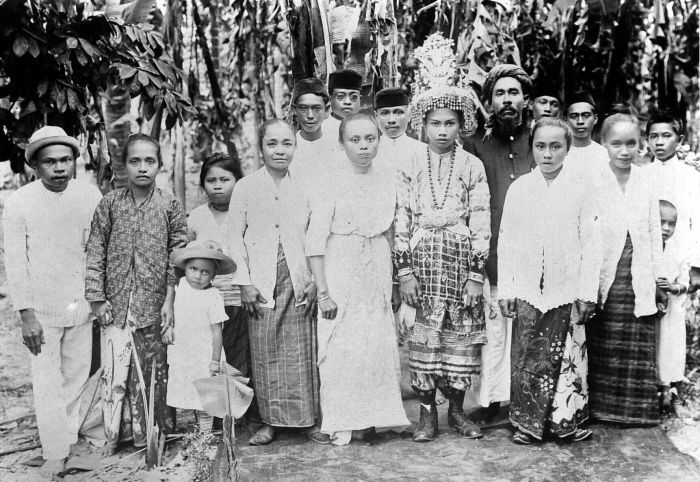
A circumcision event of the Gorontalo people during the Dutch East Indies.

The Gorontalo people have a family kinship system called pohala'a. This system is a heritage of the kingdoms that had previously established in Gorontalo. There are five pohala'as in Gorontalo, namely Gorontalo, Limboto, Suwawa, Bualemo and Atinggola, where the Gorontalo pohala'a is the most prominent.

The Gorontalo community have a high social sense, so much so that there is hardly any conflict among themselves. A tight knitted kinship system is always preserved by the Gorontalo community, as exemplified in the Pohala'a family bond system. Mutual cooperation or huyula tradition is preserved in the daily lives of the community, and issues will be solved through discussion.

Gorontalo people have a philosophy of life, namely, batanga pomaya, nyawa podungalo, harata potom bulu meaning, "the body is to defend the homeland, faithful to the end, wealth brings social problems" and lo iya lo ta uwa, ta uwa loloiya, boodila polucia hi lawo which means, "a leader is full of authority, but it's not arbitrary".

Traditional attires are multicolored, with each of the colors represent its symbolic aspect. Gorontalo people are also famous for their developed musical culture.

=== Socio-economics ===
The main traditional occupation of the Gorontalo people has long been agriculture. Gorontaloans plays an important part in forestry, agriculture and fishery industries. Crafting and livestock farms are secondary means of income.

In the past, there were large extensions of extended family who could carry out joint agricultural farming in mountainous region that required a lot of soil cultivating work. The elderly father and mother are regarded as the main hosts, which is reflected in the Gorontalo language. It has not adopted a variety of intimate forms of addressing parents and older relatives.

=== Architecture ===
The main type of Gorontalo settlement are the villages. The traditional house is called Dulohupa, consists of a frame structure built on stilts. It is built with choice timber and its roofing is made of straw. The house is then divided into several rooms. By the entrance are two staircases. In the past, Dulohupa is usually used to carry out discussions by the royal rulers. Traditional Dulohupa house can still be found in several sub-districts in Gorontalo.

Apart from Dulohupa, there is another traditional Gorontalo house called, Bandayo Poboide. However the existence of the Bandayo Poboide is almost extinct throughout the entire region of Gorontalo. One of the very few remaining Bandayo Poboide is situated in front of the Gorontalo Regent's office at Jenderal Sudirman Road, Limboto, Gorontalo.

=== Literature ===
Lumadu is a type of native Gorontalo oral literature in the form of brain exercising riddles and metaphors or parables. Lumadu is often used by children for games, while metaphoric Lumadu is often used in conversations among adults with the purpose to show courtesy for others, to broaden the conversation with others and to bring value into the subject of the conversation.

=== Folk dance ===
One of the cultural art form of the Gorontalo people is the Polopalo dance. This traditional dance is popular among the Gorontalo community, and even as far as North Sulawesi region.

=== Local traditions ===
There are several traditional customs from the Gorontalo community, among them:

- Momonto and Modutu wedding customs. In the traditional wedding customs of the Gorontalo people, there are few regulations and procedures that must be carried out by both the bride and bridegroom. Gorontalo people still hold onto the generational traditions as part of their customs and culture. The wedding ceremony is carried out alternately in both of the house of the bride and bridegroom. The wedding ceremony can last for more than two days. Relatives will work collectively in preparing the wedding ceremony for a few days prior to the wedding day. Both the bride and bridegroom will dress in the traditional attire, Bili’u. The bridal bedroom is used during the wedding reception in accordance with Gorontalo customs.
- Molontalo or Tontalo (Seventh Month Ceremony), is a customary ceremony as an expression of gratitude once a pregnancy period reaches the seventh month. In holding this customary event, both of the unborn child's parents must put on traditional Gorontalo attire. A little girl will be carried by the prospective father, circling the house and finally enters the house into the room to meet his pregnant wife. After the prospective father and the little girl meets the pregnant wife, a string made of coconut leaf that was tied around the pregnant wife previously will be severed. In this Tontalo ceremony seven dishes are served on seven different trays and then these foods are distributed among the invited guests.

== Prominent figures ==
There are several key figures who have played a role in the preservation of the Gorontalo language, including:

Manuli

He is a performer of tanggomo, a form of oral literature in the Gorontalo language. Manuli is known for his exceptional ability to memorize thousands of tanggomo verses and to spontaneously create new verses based on recent events or occurrences he has witnessed. The tanggomo verses he composed were often performed in traditional markets in Gorontalo while he was selling his goods, attracting crowds and boosting his sales. Many of his tanggomo verses were recorded and archived as digital records by Radio Republik Indonesia (RRI) Gorontalo.

Mansoer Pateda

He was a lecturer at the State University of Gorontalo (UNG). Pateda authored many books, the most well-known of which are the Gorontalo-Indonesian Dictionary and the Indonesian-Gorontalo Dictionary. He was also involved in the translation of the Quran into the Gorontalo language, a project undertaken by a team. For his contributions, he was honored with the customary title Taa Lopoolamahe Popoli, meaning 'The Best Son and Cultural Preserver of Gorontalo'.

Jusuf Sjarif Badudu

He was an expert in the Indonesian language and a professor of linguistics at Padjadjaran University. He became widely known to the public as the host of the Pembinaan Bahasa Indonesia program on TVRI from 1974 to 1979. His dedication to the Gorontalo language was evident in his book "Morfologi Bahasa Gorontalo". In recognition of his efforts, the Gorontalo Customary Council awarded him the title Taa O Ilomata To Wulito.
