= Gorontalese cuisine =

Cuisine tradition of the Gorontalese people

- Alternative names: Gorontalo cuisine or Hulontalo cuisine
- Course: Main
- Place of origin: Indonesia
- Region or state: Gorontalo, Gorontalo Peninsula, Sulawesi, Indonesia
- Serving temperature: Hot
- Main ingredients: seafood, beef, chicken, hot local chilies, and iconic spices

Gorontalese cuisine or Gorontalo cuisine is the traditional cuisine of the Gorontalese People of the Gorontalo Peninsula, North Sulawesi island, Indonesia. It is also known as Hulontalo cuisine by perantauan (migrating) Gorontalo people, after "Hulontalo", the name for Gorontalo in the Gorontalo language.

Gorontalese cuisine is known for its fresh seafood, and liberal use of spices and herbs.

The strategic location of Gorontalo, with the Celebes Sea and Pacific Ocean to the north and the Gulf of Tomini to the south, made the Gorontalo region a strategic shipping route in the past. This history has formed the roots of a unique and distinctive culture in Gorontalo, including its unique dishes.

Along with the division of Gorontalo into a province and its separation from North Sulawesi, Gorontalo's cuisine has become an increasingly popular and well-recognized as part of Indonesia's national culinary heritage.

== Traditions and characteristics of Gorontalo cuisine ==
Gorontalo cuisine is famous for its varied menu of seafood, hot local chilies, and spices.

Due to its use of spices, Gorontalo cuisine is often characterized as a simple cuisine with notes of fresh aroma and sweetness, often employing basil and pandan.

Gorontalo cuisine has been influenced by other communities who migrated to Gorontalo, such as immigrants from the Arab world, China, and Ternate-Tidore. Gorontalo's pastries are also influenced by European culture which brought by the Dutch.

== International awards ==
A Gorontalo recipe book published and popularized by Amanda Katili Niode from the Omar Niode Foundation, which is called "Trailing the Taste of Gorontalo", has received appreciation from national and international culinary activists, including Chef William Wongso and Elena Aniere from Slow Food International.

=== Yantai, China and Frankfurt, Germany ===
The Gorontalo recipe book "Trailing the Taste of Gorontalo" won the "Best in the World" award at the Gourmand World Cookbook Award in Yantai, China in 2016 for the Asian Cuisine from Asian Books category. In addition, this Gorontalese recipe book has the opportunity to appear to represent one of Indonesia's culinary treasures at the Gourmet Gallery in the Frankfurt Book Fair 2016 series, Germany.

== Cooking techniques and typical spice mixture ==
=== Cooking techniques ===
Traditional cuisines in Gorontalo are often named after cooking techniques.

==== Boiling (ilahe and bilanggahe) ====
In Gorontalo culinary, the technique of boiling fish or other proteins has a different name from that of boiling carbohydrate foods. The technique of boiling fish, prawn, and meat is named "ilahe", while boiling banana, corn, or taro is named "bilanggahe".

==== Grilling (ilalango and tilenehu) ====
As with the process of boiling, protein and carbohydrate dishes have two different names. The technique of grilling protein dishes, such as meat and fish, is called "ilalango", while that of grilling banana, corn, or taro is called "tilenehu".

==== Frying (tilinanga) ====
All fried dishes are called "tilinanga". For example, a fried banana is called lambi tilinanga, and a fried fish is called tola tilinanga. One exception is for fried flour-coated bananas, which are called sanggala.

==== Wrapping (ilepa'o) ====
The technique of grilling or steaming dishes wrapped in a banana leaf is called "ilepa’o".

=== Special type of spice mixture ===
Gorontalo cuisine also has spice mixtures such as pilitode and iloni.

Pilitode is a type of Gorontalese gulai sauce and iloni is a type of Gorontalese grilling sauce. Both are made using candlenut, ginger, turmeric and coconut milk. Dishes made with these mixes are often made with fish, chicken, beef, and seafood, as well as banana, cassava, and pumpkin.

== List of dishes ==
Local name	Image	English name	Notes
Ayam iloni			
Binte biluhuta		Sweet-Corn Soup	
Sate tuna		Tuna Satay	
Sate balanga		Wok Satay	
Bilentango		Chili Split-Fish	
Sagela		Sagela	
Tabu moitomo		Gorontalese Black Beef Soup	
Ilahe		Gorontalese Sour Fish Soup	
Nasi kuning gorontalo		Gorontalese Turmeric Rice	
Ilabulo		Ilabulo	
Ikan bakar gorontalo		Gorontalese Fish Grill	
Sambal goreng sapi			
Pilitode			
