= Gorontalo (disambiguation) =

Gorontalo may refer to:

- Gorontalo (province), a province of Indonesia on the northern part of Sulawesi island
  - Gorontalo Regency, a regency within the province
  - Gorontalo (city), capital of the province
  - Gorontalo Sultanate, a former sultanate
  - Gorontaloan people, people native to the province
  - Gorontalo language, spoken in the province
  - Gorontalo of Tidore (d. 1639), a sultan in Maluku
  - Gorontalo Post, an Indonesian regional daily newspaper
