= Gorontalo Malay =

Malay-based creole language

- Bahasa Indonesia Gorontalo
- Mobisala Molayu
- Native to: Indonesia (Gorontalo and Central Sulawesi)
- Region: Gorontalo and the northern part of Gulf of Tomini
- Ethnicity: Gorontaloan
- Native speakers: ~1,000,000
- Language family: Malay-based creole: Eastern Indonesia Malay; Manadoic Malay; Gorontalo Malay
- Writing system: Latin and Jawi

Language codes
- ISO 639-3: –
- Glottolog: None

Gorontalo Malay, also known as Bahasa Indonesia Gorontalo or Mobisala Molayu in Gorontalo, is a Malay-based creole language spoken by the majority of the Gorontalo people in the northern part of Sulawesi, Indonesia, especially in the province of Gorontalo, as well as in Buol Regency, Central Sulawesi.

Linguistically, Gorontalo Malay is classified as a trade language and a Malay-based creole. It generally functions as a lingua franca in Gorontalo and its surrounding areas, including parts of the northern Gulf of Tomini, which are also inhabited by the Gorontaloan people.

The influence of Arabic is evident in Gorontalo Malay, with several Arabic words incorporated into the language, such as ana (أنا) for the first-person singular pronoun (I) and ente (أنت) for the second-person singular pronoun (you).

== History ==
Gorontalo Malay initially developed in the coastal regions of Gorontalo, particularly in port cities. It later absorbed influences from Arabic, Dutch, Ternate Malay, and primarily from Manado Malay, alongside Gorontaloan as the native language of its speakers.

The language also shares similarities in vocabulary and grammar with Ternate Malay, a feature common to other Eastern Indonesian Malay varieties. One key difference between Gorontalo Malay and other Eastern Indonesian Malay varieties is its distinct pronunciation intonation, heavily influenced by the Gorontalo language.

== Phonology ==
In Gorontalo Malay, there are several verbs and nouns derived from Malay that undergo a change in the pronunciation of the vowel phoneme, influenced by the speech patterns of the Gorontalo language. The vowel sound [ə] in standard Malay changes to [o] in Gorontalo Malay (this change also happened at prehistoric times, see also Gorontalo–Mongondow languages). For instance, bolajar (from belajar 'to study'), posawat (from pesawat 'airplane'), and moncuci (from mencuci 'to wash') reflect this phonetic shift. Additionally, the word Melayu 'Malay' is also pronounced as Molayu in Gorontalo Malay, further demonstrating this influence.

== Grammar ==
=== Pronouns ===
Gorontalo Malay has pronouns or substitute words primarily based on Manadoic Malay languages (such as Manado Malay and Ternate Malay).

==== Personal pronouns ====
There are several loanwords from foreign languages in the personal pronouns of Gorontalo Malay, particularly from Arabic.

Pronouns	Glosa	Gorontalo Malay
First person singular	I	ana
First person plural	we	torang
Second person singular	you	ente
Second person plural	you all/you guys	ngoni
Third person singular	he/she	dia, de
Third person plural	they	dorang

==== Possessive pronouns ====
In Gorontalo Malay, the infix pe is used to indicate possession, similar to how -nya is used in standard Indonesian to denote ownership or possession. For example, in the phrase pe rumah (the house’s), pe indicates that the house belongs to someone or is associated with them. This construction helps to express possessive relationships in the language.

Glosa	Melayu Gorontalo
my book	ana pe buku
your book	ente pe buku
his/her book	dia pe buku, de pe buku
our book	torang pe buku
you guys' book	ngoni pe buku
their book	dorang pe buku
