= Gorontalo language =

Language in northern Sulawesi, Indonesia

Gorontalo
- Bahasa Hulontalo بَهَسَ هُلࣤنْتَلࣤ
- Native to: Indonesia
- Region: Gorontalo, North Sulawesi and Central Sulawesi
- Ethnicity: Gorontalo; Polahi
- Native speakers: (1 million cited 2000 census)
- Language family: Austronesian: Malayo-Polynesian; Philippine; Greater Central Philippine; Gorontalo–Mongondow; Gorontalic; Gorontalo
- Dialects: East Gorontalo; Limboto; Gorontolo City; West Gorontalo; Tilamuta
- Writing system: Latin; Pegon

Language codes
- ISO 639-2: gor
- ISO 639-3: gor
- Glottolog: goro1259
- Map of languages on the island of Sulawesi, Gorontalic languages is colored in pink along with Mongondowic languages.

The Gorontalo language (also called Hulontalo) is a Austronesian language spoken in provinces of Gorontalo, North Sulawesi and Central Sulawesi, Indonesia by the Gorontalo people and Polahi people. With around one million speakers (2000 census), it is a major language of northern Sulawesi. They belong to the Philippine sub-group, its related language is Mongondow.

Considerable lexical influence comes from Malay, Arabic, Portuguese, Dutch, and the North Halmahera languages. The Gorontalo region used to be controlled by the Sultanate of Ternate. Manado Malay and Indonesian are also spoken in the area. Despite its relatively large number of speakers, Gorontalo is under much pressure from Malay varieties, especially in urban settings.

Sizable Gorontalo communities can be found in Manado, the capital of North Sulawesi, as well as Jakarta.

Gorontalo is also influenced what is known as Gorontalo Malay, a Malay-based creole language which became the lingua franca in the province of Gorontalo.

== Classification ==
Map of languages on the island of Sulawesi. The Gorontalic languages are marked in pink, along with the Mongondowic languages.

The Gorontalo language belongs to the Gorontalic language family, which is part of the Gorontalo-Mongondow languages, a branch of the Malayo-Polynesian languages, which, in turn, is a branch of the Austronesian languages.

Languages that are related to Gorontalo include Suwawa, Bolango, Buol, Bintauna, Kaidipang, and Lolak.

== Dialects ==
Musa Kasim et al. (1981) give five main dialects of Gorontalo: east Gorontalo, Limboto, Gorontolo City, west Gorontalo, and Tilamuta.

=== Distinctive Features ===
One of the most prominent features of the Gorontalo language is the use of a vowel (a, i, u, e, o) at the end of every word. Examples include: mela (red), huyi (night), tuluhu (sleep), rasipede (bicycle), and bongo (coconut).

=== Influence on pronunciation in Indonesian ===
Additionally, the influence of the Gorontalo language is strongly evident in the pronunciation of words in Indonesian. In some verbs and nouns in Indonesian that contain the letter "E", the pronunciation automatically shifts to "O" in Gorontalo Malay. Examples include:

- bolajar (belajar - to study)
- posawat (pesawat - airplane)
- moncuci (mencuci - to wash)
- mongapa (mengapa - why)

This influence on Indonesian pronunciation is considered a distinctive characteristic of Gorontalo Malay.

== Phonology ==
Gorontalo is characterized by several sound changes, including PMP *s → Gorontalo t; *n → l; *k → ʔ; *mb, *nd → m, n; *bu → hu. Also, there are also vowel changes, such as *a turning into o (/ *b_) or e (/ {*d, *g}_); prosthesis of original initial vowels with w- or y- (before *i); and epenthesis of final consonants with -o (*anak → wala'o "child").

=== Consonants ===
Gorontalo consonants
		Labial	Alveolar		Palatal	Velar	Glottal
Nasal		m	n		ɲ	ŋ	
Plosive	voiceless	p	t	d̠	c	k	ʔ
Plosive	voiced	b	d	d̠	ɟ	ɡ	
Plosive	implosive	ɓ	ɗ				
Sonorant	plain	w	r		j		h
Sonorant	lateral		l				

Consonant sequences include NC (homorganic nasal–plosive), where C may be /b d t d̠ ɟ ɡ k/. Elsewhere, /b d/ are relatively rare and only occur before high vowels. /d̠/, written ⟨ḓ⟩ in linguistic study materials, but not distinguished from ⟨d⟩ elsewhere, is a laminal post-alveolar coronal stop that is indeterminate as to voicing. The phonemic status of [ʔ] is unclear; if [VʔV] is interpreted as vowel sequences /VV/, then this contrasts with long vowels (where the two V's are the same) and vowel sequences separated by linking glides (where the two V's are different).

=== Vowels ===
Gorontalo has five vowels.

Gorontalo vowels
	Front	Central	Back
High	i		u
Mid	e		o
Low		a	

=== Stress ===
Gorontalo words are stressed on the penultimate syllable, regardless of structure: momikiirangi "think", momikiirangipo "think before (doing something)".

== Literature ==
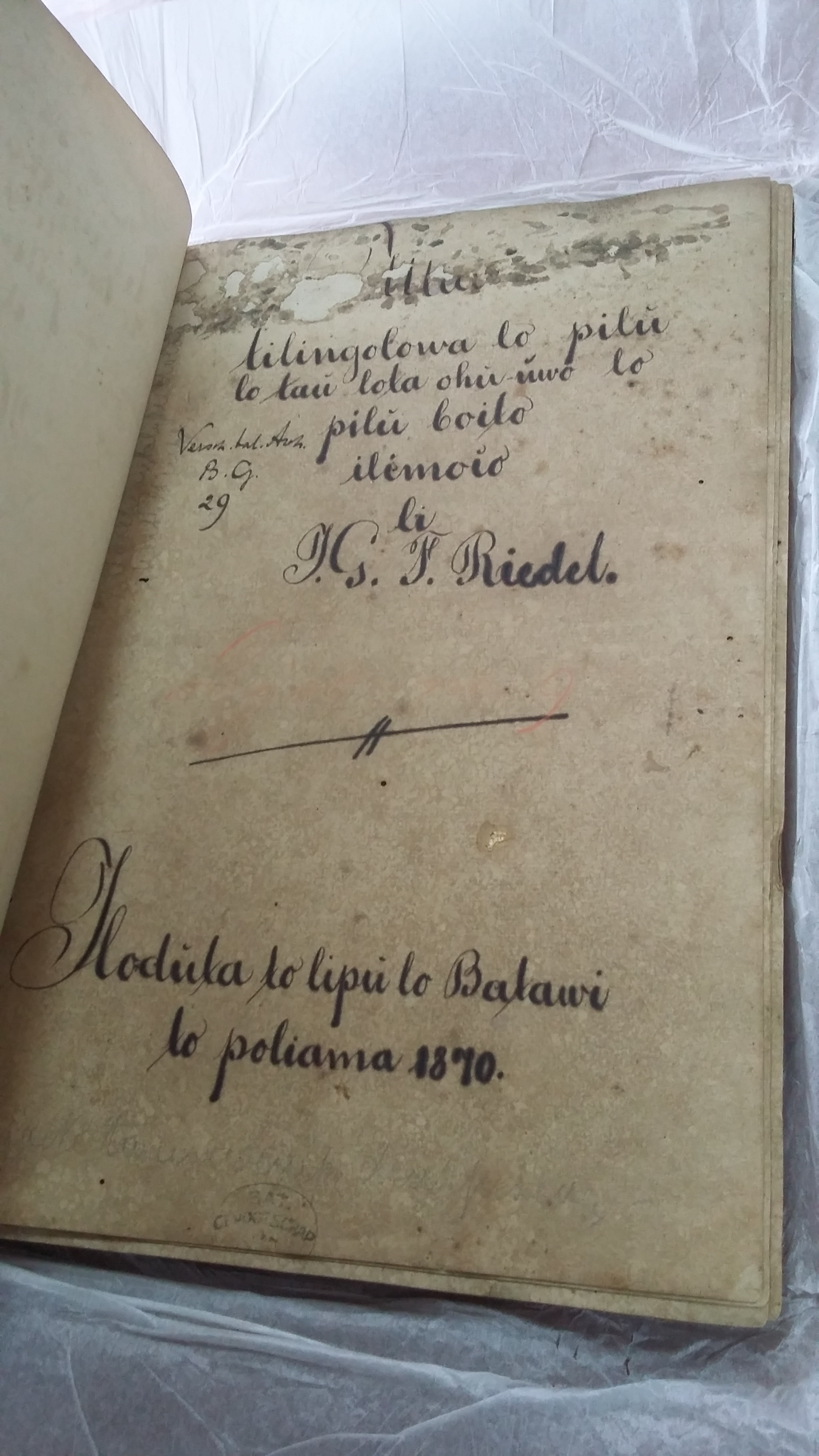
The manuscript in Gorontalo language written by J.G.F. Riedel in 1870

One of the oldest manuscripts in the Gorontalo language that has been discovered is titled Utiya tilingolowa lo pilu lo tau lota ohu-uwo lo pilu boito. Below the title of this book is written poliama 1870, which indicates the year the manuscript was written. The term poliama refers to the ancient astronomical knowledge of the Gorontalo people, based on the movements of celestial bodies, which was practiced in activities such as farming, building a new house, moving, marriage, and more. This manuscript was written by Johan Gerhard Frederich Riedel, the eldest son of the Dutch missionary J.F. Riedel.

Another relatively old book about the Gorontalo language was written by Wilhelm Joest, a world traveler and ethnographer from Germany. The book is titled Das Holontalo: Glossar und grammatische Skizze; ein Beitrag zur Kenntniss der Sprachen von Celebes, printed in Berlin in 1883.

=== Literary works ===
The Gorontalo people have long been familiar with various literary works, particularly oral literature that has been passed down from generation to generation. Some forms of oral literature that can still be found in the daily life of the Gorontalo community are:

1. Tanggomo: Narrative poetry not bound by lines, containing information about real events or true folklore.
2. Tuja'i: Rhyming poetry that contains praises, religious advice, and customary wisdom.
3. Leningo: Poetry consisting of proverbs, wise words, or expressions that can serve as life guidance.
4. Lumadu: Verse consisting of one or two sentences that convey principles of life and the character of the Gorontalo people.
5. Taleningo: Poetry that provides advice about death, birth, and preparation for the afterlife.
6. Tinilo: Gorontalo pantun that contains praises, entertainment, prayers, history, and calls for good deeds.

The biggest challenge for these various forms of oral literature in Gorontalo is empowering the younger generation to preserve the literary and cultural heritage of their ancestors, which is increasingly being eroded by the passage of time. One of the greatest difficulties in efforts to preserve the various forms of Gorontalo oral literature is the limited cadre of oral literature practitioners, as it is only spoken and memorized by performers, cultural figures, or local elders. This has led to the scarcity of written texts documenting Gorontalo oral literature.

The only and very limited references related to Gorontalo oral literature can be traced back to the arrival of Islamic preachers and Dutch colonizers in Gorontalo, who introduced various forms of written works as mediums of writing and communication for the Gorontalo people.

== Vocabulary ==
=== Family tree ===
Gorontalo language	English
Ti Bapu	grandfather
Ti Nene	grandmother
Tiyamo, Ti Papa, Ti Sebe	father
Tilo, Ti Mama, Ti Ajus	mother
Ti Om	uncle
Ti Tante	aunt
Ti Kaka	older brother
Ti Tata	older sister
Te Uti, Te Nunu	younger brother
Ti No'u, Ti Pi'i	younger sister

Note: The words Ti and Te are forms of address commonly used by the Gorontalo people when referring to or addressing someone.

- The word Ti is added when addressing a woman or an older, respected person (as a sign of respect and honor).
- The word Te is added when addressing a man or a younger male and is also used for male peers.

=== Numbers ===
Gorontalo language		Indonesian		English	
Cardinal	Ordinal	Cardinal	Ordinal	Cardinal	Ordinal
Tuwawu	Oyinta	satu	kesatu	one	first
Duluwo	Oluwo	dua	kedua	two	second
Totolu	Otulu	tiga	ketiga	three	third
Wopatu	Opato	empat	keempat	four	fourth
Limo	Olimo	lima	kelima	five	fifth
Wolomo	Olomo	enam	keenam	six	sixth
Pitu	Opitu	tujuh	ketujuh	seven	seventh
Walu	Owalu	delapan	kedelapan	eight	eighth
Tiyo	Otiyo	sembilan	kesembilan	nine	ninth
Mopulu	Opulu	sepuluh	kesupuluh	ten	tenth
