= Binte biluhuta =

Gorontalo corn soup with shrimp and skipjack tuna

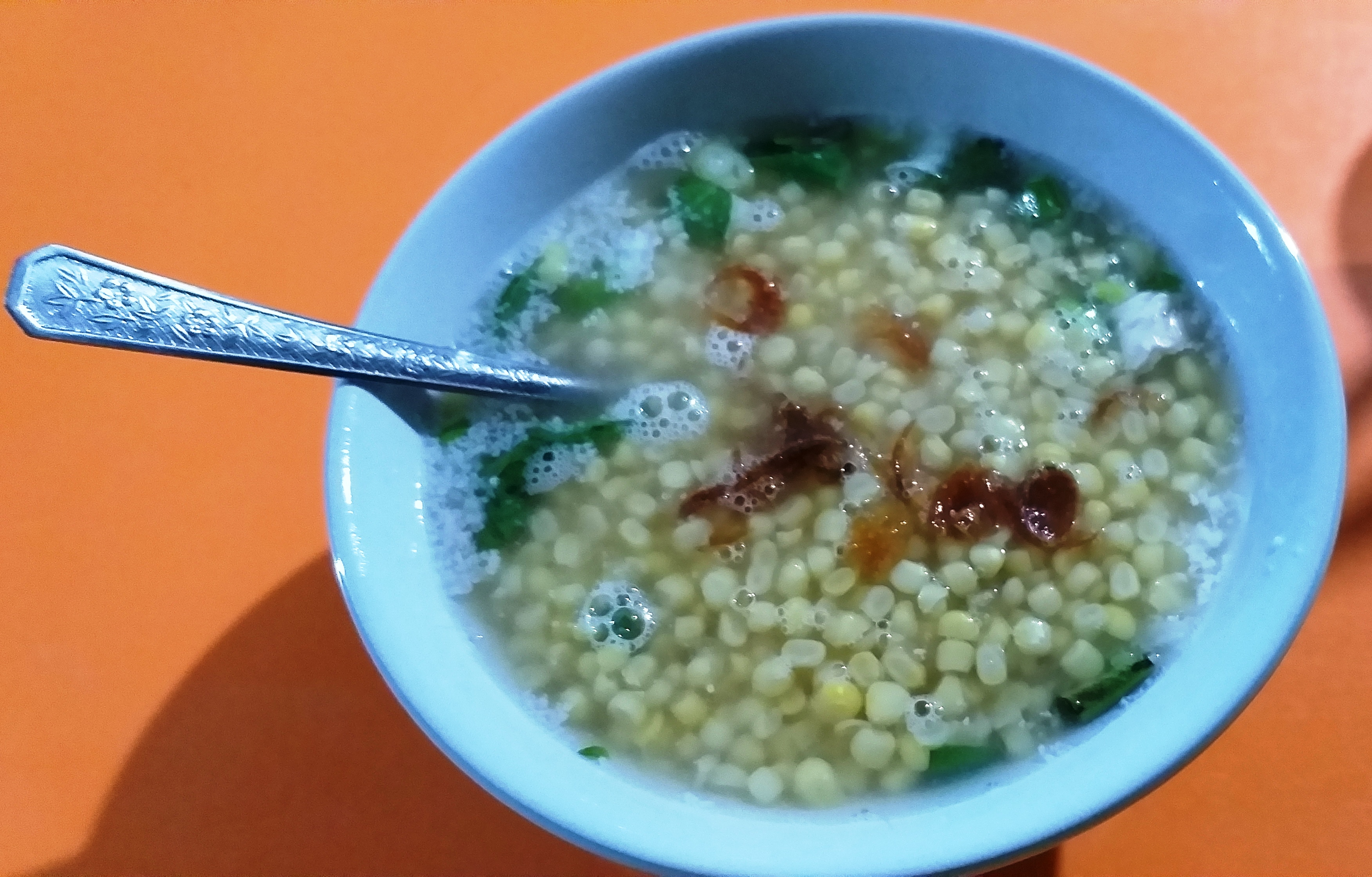
- Binte biluhuta with shredded coconut, shredded skipjack tuna, and shrimp
- Alternative names: Milu Siram, Gorontalo sweet-corn soup
- Course: Soup
- Place of origin: Indonesia
- Region or state: Gorontalo, Sulawesi island
- Serving temperature: Hot
- Main ingredients: corn, shrimp, skipjack tuna

Binte biluhuta is a poured boiled-sweet corn or corn soup originates from the Gorontalese cuisine, Sulawesi island, Indonesia.

Binte biluhuta is a typical food of Gorontalese, which is referred to Gorontalo people. Binte biluhuta is also known as Milu Siram in Gorontalo Malay language.

Binte biluhuta is served hot with shredded coconut, basil leaves, shredded skipjack tuna, and shrimp.

== National intangible cultural heritage ==
In 2016, Binte biluhuta as one of Indonesian cuisine has become a national intangible cultural heritage of Indonesia, determined by the Ministry of Education and Culture, Republic of Indonesia.

== See also ==
- Gorontalese cuisine
- Indonesian cuisine
- Sate tuna
- List of Indonesian soups
