= Sangir people =

Native people to the Sangir Islands

Sangir
Sangir, Sangihe, Sangil
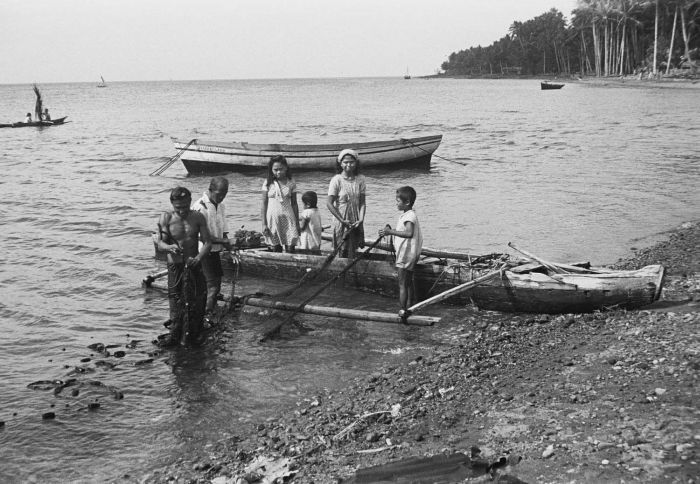
- A fishing family outside at the beach with net in Sangir Island, December 1948.

Total population
- approx. 600,000 people

Regions with significant populations
- Indonesia: North Sulawesi: 449,805; Gorontalo: 7,489; North Maluku; Philippines (2020): South-Central Mindanao: 10,898; Davao Region: 8,841

Languages
- Native; Sangiric languages (mainly Sangir); Also; Minahasan • Manado Malay • Indonesian (Indonesian Sangir); Cebuano • Filipino • English (Philippine Sangir)

Religion
- Christianity (mainly Protestant with significant Catholic minorities), minority Sunni Islam

Related ethnic groups
- Moro peoples; Lumad; Visayans; Gorontaloan; Minahasan; Mongondow; Talaud; Other Austronesian peoples

Sangir people (Sangir: Tau Sanger/Sangihe), also known as Sangirese, are native people of the Sangir Islands in the northern chain of islands in Sulawesi and the southern part of Mindanao. The Sangirese people are fishermen and nutmeg growers in their home areas and also work as wage labourers in industrial crops enterprises in Bolaang Mongondow Regency and Minahasa Regency.

The Sangirese have traditionally been concentrated in the province of North Sulawesi in Indonesia and the Region of Dávao in the Philippines. Many Sangirese migrants inhabit mainland Sulawesi, as well as North Maluku, including Ternate and Halmahera. The (Muslim) Sangil of the Philippines, who represent an early migrant group, are ethnically distinct from the (predominantly Christian) Sangirese of Indonesia, and are considered part of the Moro.

Genetic studies have shown that the Sangir have partial Papuan descent.

== Language ==
The Sangirese speak their native Sangirese, Talaud, and Indonesian, as well as their dialects, which belong to the Austronesian language family. The Sasahara language (meaning sea speech) is a sacred language developed in the first half of the 20th century. It has been widely spoken among Sangirese sailors or pirates. It includes a large number of words borrowed or distorted from other languages. Manado Malay, the lingua franca of North Sulawesi, is also widely spoken among the Sangirese.

== History ==
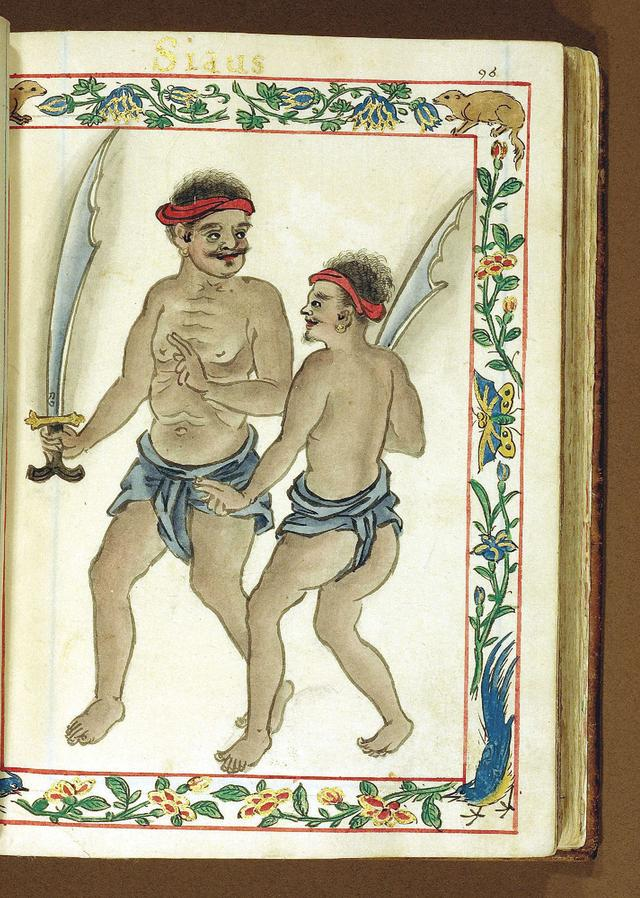
Sangirese warriors visiting and settling in the Philippines, Originally from Siau Island (Boxer Codex, c.1590)

The primary settlements of the Sangirese people are the Sangihe Islands. Archaeologists have determined that the first humans that arrived in the region of islands were in the 3rd millennium BCE and probably were a mix of Veddoids and Negritos. In the 1st millennium BCE, Austronesian migrants came here through the southern Philippines. They assimilated the natives and began to develop agriculture, to produce fabrics and ceramics. Modern Sangirese people are the direct descendants of that population that has developed on Sangihe Islands and parts of Davao Occidental (particularly in the Sarangani Islands), Davao del Norte, Davao del Sur, Sultan Kudarat, South Cotabato, and Cotabato before the start of the modern era.

The Sangirese people consider themselves to have originated directly from Sangir Island and their primogenitor being Gumansalangi, a cultural hero who lived around the 14th to 15th century. During this period, the Sangihe Islands formed a government under the authority of the Muslim rulers of the Maluku Islands. In the 16th century, the Ternatean people subdued the Sangirese people, and the islands were discovered by the Portuguese. Then, in the 17th century, they were initially captured and became part of the Spanish colonial rule; which resulted in vocabulary borrowed from the Spanish language that is still preserved in the Sangirese language, and then followed by the Dutch who came later to occupy them in 1677. Maluku sultans also continued to consider the Sangihe Islands as part of their territory.

By the 19th century, European influence was limited to trading. As Sangihe Islands were between Dutch and Spanish possessions, the local inhabitants had successfully performed the role of middleman dealers and smugglers. This led to the emergence of Sangirese settlements in Sulawesi and the southern Philippines. Their populations (much like the Sama-Bajau) were separated when borders were drawn between the Philippines and Indonesia during the colonial era. Sangirese resettlements in other areas of the eastern Celebes Sea were contributed by the catastrophic volcanic eruption of Mount Awu on Sangir Island on 2 March 1856. In the 19th century, the presence of Protestant missionaries and the increased role of colonial officers began to appear on the island, thus the Sangirese in the Sangihe Islands mostly converted to Protestant Christianity due to proximity and contact with the Christian Minahasa people of Sulawesi. In the Philippines, most Sangirese converted to Islam due to the influence of the neighboring Sultanate of Maguindanao.

In 1945, Indonesia gained its independence. In 1950, the Sulawesi and Sangihe Islands became part of Indonesia. In the Philippines, Spain surrendered the territories to the United States in 1898 as the result of the Spanish-American War, then became independent from the United States as part of the jurisdiction of the Philippines in 1946. The first decade of the reign under the Indonesian Administration started the fight against smuggling, which involved many Sangirese people, as well as the participation of some Sangirese people in the anti-government movement. In the late 1950s to early 1960s, disappointed Sangirese Indonesians took action to recreate migration to the Philippines. Migration of the Sangirese population between the two countries took place in that period.

== Religion ==
Ancient belief systems of the Sangirese people are polytheistic, which include the belief in many spirits of nature and ancestral, the ritual worship of inanimate objects, and magic. Among Sangirese people are a class of distinguished shamans or priests that acted as mediators between the world humans and spirits, to protect patients and children, and to perform miracles. Despite the spread of Islam and Christianity, many ancient rituals are still practiced.

Islam began to spread in the 15th to 16th century from the Maluku Islands and North Sulawesi; but before the arrival of Europeans, they had a very limited impact. In the 17th century, a group of Sangirese Muslims migrated to the area of Manado, which has a separate religious and ethnic group from the Sangirese people. In the 19th to early 20th century, Muslims among the Sangirese people became preachers to other Dutch colonies in Asia.

The first Christian missionaries that arrived were the Spanish Catholic monks in the 17th century, but their activity had little long-term effects. In 1857, the Sangihe Islands opened to Protestant missionaries. The majority of Sangirese people today profess Protestantism, being at the same time strongly influenced by the Minahasan people.

As of 2024, about 87% of Indonesian Sangir people (combined data) from the Sangihe Islands Regency and Sitaro Islands Regency profess Christianity, the majority being Protestants. While Muslims comprise about 12% of the people, and the rest profess native beliefs.

In the Philippines, most Sangirese are of the Sunni Muslims due to the stronger influence of the Sultanate of Maguindanao. Since ancient times they have had massive relations with local Muslim rulers, such as Maguindanao, Ternate, and Buayan. They are also known as good and skilled warriors for the Maguindanao Sultanate, therefore it is not surprising that most of Sangirese in Mindanao are mostly Muslim.

== Culture ==
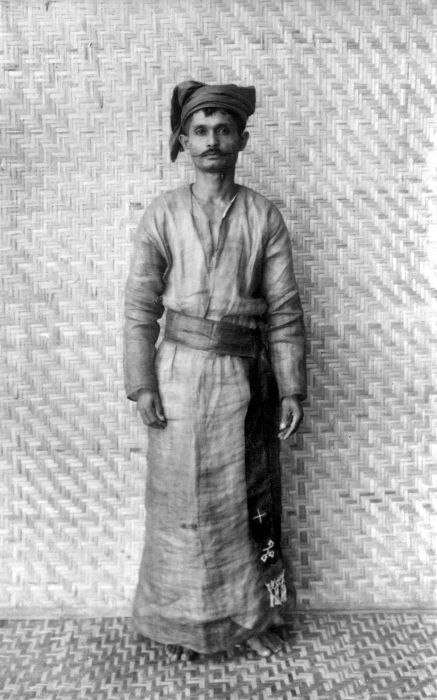
A Sangir man in koffo attire, 1929.

Sangirese folklore is famous for its dance art. Local dances include gunde, alabadiri, masamper, ampawayer and so on. Previously, they had ritual gatherings, but nowadays it is also accompanied by public holidays. Sangirese dance represents a certain set of smooth body movements of the dancer dancing but organized dance of large groups of dancers is usually accompanied by a musical band and female rhythmic singing.

=== Lifestyle and economy ===
Sangir people are engaged in fishing, hunting, farming (the main crops are tubers, root crops, bananas, and sago), and transit marine trading between Sulawesi, Maluku Islands, and the Philippines. The sources often mention the cultivation of taro culture, which was cultivated on the slopes of mountains and near rivers. To protect the cultivated fruits like coconuts from thefts, residents from Sangir hung small dolls (in Sangirese language, urǒ), which, according to legend, will "pursue a thief". Agriculture is considered to be mainly women's work. Relationship lineage and the transfer of previously inherited lands occur in the female line. The main occupations of Sangirese men are such as shipbuilding, seafaring, and trade.

Forestry production (harvesting of rattan and ebony wood), blacksmithing, and weaving were also widely spread. The economy is mainly characterized by manual labor. It is known that the main diet of Sangirese people is fish with vegetables.

The main centers of settlements of the Sangirese people are located in the coastal zones. Previously, their houses were erected on stilts, but gradually they are replaced by modern houses built like the typical Indonesian type. Families who live in the same village, forms a community called soa. Resettled Sangirese people from Sangihe Islands seek out and continually maintain family ties with their soa; which would help them to preserve their identity in an environment similar in language and culture of their people.

=== Institute of marriage ===
In the Sangirese society; which reached a high density by the 20th century, marriage is entered relatively late. Historically, the tradition of buying a bride as an important institution of public organization. Sometimes the ransom looked like whole plots.

== Notable people ==
- Frans Mohede, Indonesian actor, singer and martial artist
- Jan Engelbert Tatengkeng, Indonesian poet
- Jordi Amat, Indonesian footballer
- Mike Mohede, Indonesian singer
- Monty Tiwa, Indonesian composer and film director
- Sheva Sanggasi, Indonesian footballer
