= Mongondow language =

Austronesian language spoken in Sulawesi, Indonesia

Mongondow
- Bolaang Mongondow
- Native to: Indonesia
- Region: North Sulawesi
- Ethnicity: Mongondow people
- Native speakers: (230,000 cited 2000 census)
- Language family: Austronesian: Malayo-Polynesian; Philippine; Greater Central Philippine; Gorontalo–Mongondow; Mongondowic; Mongondow

Language codes
- ISO 639-3: mog
- Glottolog: mong1342
- Map of languages on the island of Sulawesi, Mongondowic languages is colored in pink along with Gorontalic languages.

Mongondow, or Bolaang Mongondow, is one of the Philippine languages spoken in Bolaang Mongondow Regency as well as Kotamobagu city and neighbouring regencies (North Bolaang Mongondow Regency, South Bolaang Mongondow Regency and East Bolaang Mongondow Regency) of North Sulawesi (Celebes) and Gorontalo Provinces, Indonesia. With more than 200,000 speakers, it is the major language of the regency. Historically, it served as the official language of the Bolaang Mongondow Kingdom.

There is some lexical influence from Malay and Ternate, as well as the Indonesian national language. It is a threatened language, with a shift to Manado Malay in the younger generation. The moribund Lolak language has borrowed much of its lexicon from Mongondow, but appears to be more closely related to Gorontalo.

== Phonology ==
Mongondow has the following phoneme inventory:

Vowels
	Front	Central	Back
Close	i		u
Mid	e		o
Open		a	

Consonants
		Labial	Alveolar	Palatal	Velar	Glottal
Nasal		m	n	ɲ	ŋ	
Plosive	voiceless	p	t		k	ʔ
Plosive	voiced	b	d	(d͡ʒ)	ɡ	
Fricative			s			h
Lateral			l			
Rhotic			r			
Approximant		w		j		

The lateral /l/ is pronounced as alveolar [l] when adjacent to the front vowels /e/, /i/. In all other environments, it is a retroflex [ɭ].

== Grammar ==
=== Pronouns ===
The personal pronouns are:

	nominative	genitive	oblique
1.sg.	akuoy	-ku	inako'
2.sg.	iko	-mu	inimu
3.sg.	sia	-ea/-nya	inia
1.pl.inclusive	kita	-naton	inaton
1.pl.exclusive	kami	-nami	inami
2.pl.	mo'iko kamu-*	-monimu -namu-*	imonimu -inamu-*
3.pl.	mosia taya-*	-monia -naya-*	imonia inaya-*
* kamu-, taya- etc. are used with suffixed numerals, e.g. taya-tolu 'the three of them'

=== Numerals ===
1	inta' / mita'
2	dua' / doyowa'
3	tolu'
4	opat
5	lima
6	onom
7	pitu
8	ualu
9	siow
10	mopulu'
11	mopulu' bo mita'
12 (...)	mopulu' bo doyowa'
20	doyowa no pulu'
21 (...)	doyowa no pulu' bo mita'
30	tolu no pulu'
40 (...)	opat no pulu'
100	mogatut
200 (...)	doyowa no gatut
1000	tongo ribu
2000 (...)	doyowa no ribu

== Bibliography ==
- Dunnebier, W. (1929a). "Spraakkunst van het Bolaang Mongondowsch" [Bolaang Mongondow Grammar]. Bijdragen tot de Taal-, Land- en Volkenkunde (in Dutch). 85 (1): 297–468. doi:10.1163/22134379-90001486.
- Dunnebier, W. (1929b). "Spraakkunst van het Bolaang Mongondowsch (Tweede gedeelte)" [Bolaang Mongondow Grammar (second part)]. Bijdragen tot de Taal-, Land- en Volkenkunde (in Dutch). 85 (1): 524–621. doi:10.1163/22134379-90001490.
- Dunnebier, W. (1930). "Spraakkunst van het Bolaang Mongondowsch (Slot)" [Bolaang Mongondow Grammar (final part)]. Bijdragen tot de Taal-, Land- en Volkenkunde (in Dutch). 86 (1): 42–177. doi:10.1163/22134379-90001466.
- Sneddon, J.N. (1989). "The North Sulawesi microgroups: In search of higher level connections". In Sneddon, J.N. (ed.). Studies in Sulawesi Linguistics I. NUSA 31. Jakarta: Badan Penyelenggara Seri NUSA. pp. 83–107.
- Sneddon, J.N. (1991). "The position of Lolak". In Harlow, Ray (ed.). VICAL 2. Western Austronesian and Contact Languages. Papers from the Fifth International Conference on Austronesian Linguistics. Auckland: Linguistic Society of New Zealand. pp. 299–318. ISBN 0-908928-00-9. OCLC 59606647.
- Usup, Hunggu Tadjuddin; Rompas, Henkie; Kuhon, J.; Moningkey-Rumambi, S.V.; Toding Datu, M.M.; Rattu, A.B.G. (1981). Morfologi dan Sintaksis bahasa Bolaang Mongondow (in Indonesian). Jakarta: Pusat Pembinaan dan Pengembangan Bahasa, Departemen Pendidikan dan Kebudayaan. OCLC 568558060.
- Babcock, Tim (1990). "History: Colonial Stronghold in the North". In Volkman, Toby Alice; Caldwell, Ian (eds.). Sulawesi: Island Crossroads of Indonesia. Lincolnwood: Passport Books. pp. 192–193. ISBN 0-8442-9906-5. OCLC 26056424.
