= Sate tuna =

Indonesian dish originally from Gorontalo

Sate Tuna
- Course: Main course
- Place of origin: Indonesia
- Region or state: Gorontalo, Sulawesi island
- Created by: Gorontalese cuisine
- Serving temperature: Hot
- Main ingredients: skipjack tuna

Sate tuna or tuna satay, also commonly referred as Gorontalese tuna satay is a speciality satay, originally from Gorontalese cuisine, Sulawesi island, Indonesia.

Sate tuna or sate Gorontalo founded by Gorontalese since early 19th Century and it is so popular because of the skipjack tuna fish quality from the Sulawesi Sea and Gulf of Tomini.

== Typical Gorontalo satay ==
Sate tuna made by Gorontalo people in Sulawesi from a fresh skipjack tuna cut into small cubes and served without peanut sauce or soy sauce. Unlike other satays, sate tuna is served with dabu-dabu malita (a spicy chili sauce).

== See also ==
- Satay
- Binte biluhuta
- Gorontalese cuisine
- Indonesia cuisine
