= Ponosakan language =

Austronesian language spoken in Sulawesi, Indonesia

Ponosakan
- Native to: Indonesia
- Region: Southeast Minahasa Regency, North Sulawesi
- Ethnicity: Ponosakan people
- Native speakers: 3 (2024)
- Language family: Austronesian: Malayo-Polynesian; Philippine; Greater Central Philippine; Gorontalo–Mongondow; Mongondowic; Ponosakan

Language codes
- ISO 639-3: pns
- Glottolog: pono1240
- Location within Sulawesi Location within Indonesia Location within Southeast Asia
- Coordinates: 0°55′N 124°43′E

Ponosakan is a moribund Austronesian language spoken in the vicinity of the district of Belang, Southeast Minahasa, North Sulawesi, Indonesia. This language is almost extinct, with only four fluent speakers left as of November 2014.

However, a decade later in November 2024, according to BBC News Indonesia, only three fluent speakers of Ponosakan are left, namely Erfie Liu, Rohana Nou, and Wasila Pua. Because of this, the local government has attempted to prevent its extinction by teaching it at elementary schools since 2024.

== Classification ==
The locals in North Sulawesi often falsely identify Ponosakan as a Minahasan language, due to the ethnic group's self-identification as a subgroup of Minahasan people. However, there is no doubt among scholars that this language actually belongs to the Gorontalo–Mongondow subgroup. The Gorontalo–Mongondow languages are commonly classified as a part of the Philippine subfamily; Robert Blust specifically includes it in the Greater Central Philippine languages, alongside—among others—Tagalog and Visayan languages.

In comparison to other Gorontalo–Mongondow languages, Ponosakan is relatively conservative in terms of phonology and structure.

== Demography and distribution ==
Ponosakan is spoken at the eastern end of Gorontalo–Mongondow languages' distribution. This language has been spoken by the Ponosakan people in and around Belang from at least the 17th century. Before World War II, Ponosakan was the most spoken language not only in Belang, but also in several other settlements around it. But even in the 1920s, its number of speakers was already in decline. (Note: Het Ponosakansch, thans reeds aan 't verdwijnen... [Ponosakan, now already disappearing]) Influx of migrants from other areas also altered the region's demography; when World War II started, already half of Belang residents were newcomers who did not speak Ponosakan. By the second half of the 20th century, "virtually no ethnic Ponosakans were learning the language anymore".

In November 2014, there were reportedly only four elderly people who could still speak Ponosakan fluently. Ponosakan has the fewest speakers among the Gorontalo–Mongondow languages.

== Phonology ==
There are 16 consonants and 5 vowels in Ponosakan. In addition, the phoneme /ʤ/ only occurs in loanwords.

1. Consonants
		Labial	Alveolar/ Palatal	Velar	Glottal
Nasal		m	n	ŋ	
Stop	voiceless	p	t	k	ʔ
Stop	voiced	b	d	ɡ	
Fricative			s		h
Lateral			l		
Trill			r		
Semivowel		w	j		

Consonants /w/, /r/, /h/ emerged from intervocalic and word-final lenition of earlier *(C)b, *Cd, and *(C)g (*C = any consonant). This type of lenition is still synchronic in Ponosakan: bohoyan "give (locative focus)", but mowohoy "give (active focus)"; dalom "depth", but moralom "deep". The lenited result of word-internal *d is less predictable though, as it became either /j/ and /h/ (but the former reflex is more common than the latter). Similar to Mongondow, the Ponosakan /l/ has an allophone (Note: Danie et al. proposes it as retroflex /𝼈/, noting it as "voiced prepalatal lateral flap" (bunyi lateral flap prepalatal bersuara), whereas Lobel argues that it is velar or uvular lateral approximant (/ʟ/ or /ʟ̠/).), which is usually pronounced when adjacent to the front vowels /e/, /i/, /a/, and /u/. However, due to the adjacency of both phonemes and the influence of Manado Malay usage since childhood (which notably only has /l/), both letters might have undergone a phonemic merger, though older people can still barely retain the distinction.

2. Vowels
	Front	Central	Back
Closed	i		u
Mid	e		o
Open		a	

In word-final positions, /h/ and /l/ go silent and leave compensatory lengthening on the vowels.

Non-past verb forms
Agent focus	mohanggel [mohaŋɡeː]	mohisoh [mohisoː]
Object focus	anggelon [aŋɡelon]	isohon [isohon]
Meaning	'slice (fish)'	'play'

Alongside this, there are isolated instances of long aa on words such as ginaa 'breath' and bulaan 'gold', which came from earlier sequences *-awa- (*ginawa, *bulawan).

== Grammar ==
=== Pronouns ===
As with other Philippine languages, pronouns in Ponosakan are distinguished by case (nominative, genitive, and oblique); number (singular and plural); and, for the first person plural pronouns, clusivity (inclusive and exclusive). Other than the contrast between the singular and plural forms, Ponosakan also exhibits "count forms" for second and third person pronouns. These forms are always followed by a number, as in siyatolu 'the three of them' and siya'opat 'the four of them'. In contrast, plural forms cannot be followed by a number. Both the count and plural forms can be used to represent any number of people, although there is a preference towards using the count forms for smaller numbers.

=== Case markers ===
There are three cases in Ponosakan: nominative, genitive, and oblique. Each case has its own marker, although the same marker is used for both nominative and genitive cases in common nouns.

3. Case markers
		Nominative	Genitive	Oblique
Common		in	in	kon
Personal	singular	si	i	ki/kongki
Personal	plural	say	nay	konay

=== Demonstratives ===
There are three root words for demonstratives in Ponosakan: (1) na’a 'near speaker (whether or not also near addressee)', (2) niyon 'near addressee (but not speaker)', and (3) tain or makota/takota 'far from both speaker and addressee'. Examples of usage:

Onu na'a? 'What's this? (near speaker, or near both speaker and addressee)'
Onu niyon? 'What's that? (near addressee but not speaker)'
Onu in tain? 'What's that? (far from both)'

=== Interrogatives ===
There are at least 16 interrogative words in Ponosakan. Most of them contain one of the following three roots: -onu, -onda, and -ʔene. The form -onu by itself means 'what', but this root form can also be found in mo’onu 'when', mongonu 'why', songonu 'how much', and kosongonu 'how many times'. The form -onda when used in isolation means 'where' (used after verbs only), but this base can also be found in ko’onda 'where', na’onda 'how (manner)', and ta’onda 'which'. The base -ʔene is prefixed with case markers for personal names to form personal interrogatives (see table 3): si’ene 'who (nominative)', i’ene 'who (genitive)', and ki’ene 'to whom (oblique)'; or, for the plural forms, say’ene, nay’ene, and konay’ene. The only interrogative word which doesn't show any of the above base forms is oyo 'why'.

=== Negators ===
Negation in Ponosakan is found in several forms. The word deya' 'no' negates verbs, adjectives, existence or location. The word dika 'don't!' is used to negate commands. The word di’iman 'not' negates nouns and equational sentences. There are also doi’ which means 'don't like, doesn't like' and ta’awe which means 'I don't know'.
