= Bonda script =

Bonda Script Suwawa Script Suwawa-Gorontalo Script
- Script type: Alphabet
- Period: Unknown
- Languages: Suwawa, Gorontalo

Bonda script, also known as the Suwawa script or Suwawa-Gorontalo script, is a writing system originating from the Suwawa region in the province of Gorontalo, Indonesia.

This script was traditionally used by the Suwawa people to write in the Suwawa language and Gorontalo language.

The Bonda script is no longer in active use and is now only known by some members of the inland Suwawa community (Al-Idrus, 2019).

== Script forms ==
Bonda script (Suwawa-Gorontalo script)
Vowel characters
Consonant characters
Syllable examples
