= Sangir language =

Austronesian language spoken in Indonesia

Sangir
- Sangihé, Sangil, Sangihẹ̌, Sangér
- Native to: Indonesia; Philippines
- Region: North Sulawesi; North Maluku; Davao del Sur; Davao Occidental; Davao Oriental; Sarangani
- Ethnicity: Sangir
- Native speakers: Sangir: 170,000 (2010); Sangil: 15,000 (1996)
- Language family: Austronesian: Malayo-Polynesian; Philippine; Sangiric; North; Sangir
- Writing system: Latin

Language codes
- ISO 639-3: Either: sxn – Sangir snl – Sangil
- Glottolog: nort2871
- Map of languages on the island of Sulawesi, Sangiric languages is colored in orange with Sangir is in number 2.

Sangir, also known as Sangihé, Sangi, Sangil, or Sangih, is an Austronesian language spoken on the islands linking northern Sulawesi, Indonesia, with Mindanao, Philippines by the Sangir people. It belongs to the Philippine group within the Austronesian language family.

Some lexical influence comes from Ternate and Spanish, as well as Dutch and Malay. Many of the Sangirese have migrated to areas outside of the Sangihe archipelago, including mainland Sulawesi, as well as the Philippines, where the language remains vigorous, most of them living in Balut Island in Davao Occidental. Sangir is also spoken by Sangirese migrants in North Maluku, Indonesia.

Manado Malay is commonly used among the Sangirese, sometimes as a first language. Manado Malay is particularly influential in Tahuna and Manado.

== Phonology ==
=== Consonants ===
| | | Labial | Alveolar | Retroflex | Palatal | Velar | Glottal |
|---|---|---|---|---|---|---|---|
| Plosive | voiceless | p | t | | | k | ʔ |
| Plosive | voiced | b | d | | | ɡ | |
| Nasal | | m | n | | | ŋ | |
| Fricative | | β | s | | | ɣ | h |
| Rhotic | | | ɾ | | | | |
| Lateral | | | l | 𝼈 | | | |
| Approximant | | w | | | j | | |

/ɣ/ is mainly heard in the Sangihé dialect.

=== Vowels ===
| | Front | Central | Back |
|---|---|---|---|
| Close | i | ɨ | u |
| Mid | e | | o |
| Open | | a | |

- Vowels /i, e, a, o, u/ may also be heard as [ɪ, ɛ, ə, ɔ, ʊ] within syllables.
- /ɨ/ can be heard as [ɨ], [ɯ], [ə].
