= Bantik language =

Austronesian language spoken in Sulawesi, Indonesia

Bantik
- Native to: Indonesia
- Region: North Sulawesi
- Native speakers: 1,200 (2010)
- Language family: Austronesian: Malayo-Polynesian; Philippine; Sangiric; South; Bantik

Language codes
- ISO 639-3: bnq
- Glottolog: bant1286

Bantik is an endangered Austronesian language, perhaps a Philippine language, of North Sulawesi, Indonesia. It is the traditional language of the Bantik people (a subgroup of Minahasans), who are now switching to Manado Malay (the local variety of Malay) as their language for everyday communication. While using Indonesian for formal and religious occasions. Though Bantik is still used as a marker of ethnic identity.

Bantik is regarded as a men's language, used by men in private, and it is considered improper to speak to women in Bantik. Very few women under the age of 30 know how to speak it.

== Phonology ==
=== Vowels ===
Bantik vowels
	Front	Back
High	i	u
Mid	e	o
Low	a	

=== Consonants ===
Bantik consonants
		Bilabial	Alveolar	Velar	Glottal
Stop	voiceless	p	t	k	ʔ
Stop	voiced	b	d	ɡ	
Nasal		m	n	ŋ	
Fricative			s		h
Flap			ɾ		

== Grammar ==
=== Morphology ===
Bantik is agglutinative.

=== Syntax ===
The basic sentence orders of Bantik are subject–verb–object and verb–object–subject. The former is used when introducing a new object, the latter when introducing a new subject.
