= Buol language =

Austronesian language spoken in Sulawesi, Indonesia

Buol
- Apadu Vuolo
- Pronunciation: ['apadu 'βuɔʎɔ]
- Native to: Indonesia
- Region: Buol Regency, Central Sulawesi
- Ethnicity: Buol people
- Native speakers: (96,000 cited 2000 census)
- Language family: Austronesian: Malayo-Polynesian; Philippine; Greater Central Philippine; Gorontalo–Mongondow; Gorontalic; Buol

Language codes
- ISO 639-3: blf
- Glottolog: buol1237
- Map of languages on the island of Sulawesi, Gorontaloic languages is colored in pink with Buol in number 5.

Buol (Apadu Buol, Bual, Bwo’ol, Bwool, Dia) is an Austronesian language spoken by the Buol people in Buol Regency (Central Sulawesi Province), northwestern Sulawesi, Indonesia. Buol is a Philippine language, its related to the Gorontalo language spoken in Gorontalo province.

== Phonology ==
The vowels of Buol are /a e i o u/. Stress falls on penultimate syllable, with sequence of like vowels counting as one syllable.

The consonants are as follows:

Buol Consonants
		Labial	Apical	Palatal	Velar	Glottal
Nasal		m	n		ŋ	
Plosive/ Affricate	voiceless	p	t̪		k	(ʔ)
Plosive/ Affricate	voiced	b	d	(dʒ)	ɡ	
Fricative		β	(s)			(h)
Approximant			l	j	w	
Trill			r			

/dʒ/ occurs in loans. /h/, /s/, /ʔ/ are found in loans and a small number of native words, such as /buahaŋa/ 'k.o. cricket', /sio/ 'nine', /naʔal/ 'bark slippers'.

/β/ only occurs before /u/, but there are near-minimal pairs such as /βuŋo/ 'fruit', /buŋol/ 'leaf'.

/l/ is pronounced [l] after a front vowel, as in [dila] 'tongue'; [ɽ] if not preceded, but followed by a front vowel, as in [aɽe] 'chin'; and [ʎ] elsewhere. However, there is an exception with the sequences /lala, lola, lolo/, where the first /l/ is pronounced [l], as in /lolo/ [loʎo] 'face'.
