= James Sneddon =

Australian linguist

- Born: James Neil Sneddon
- Occupation: Linguist

Academic background
- Education: Australian National University
- Thesis: Tondano Phonology and Grammar (1974)

Academic work
- Institutions: Griffith University
- Main interests: Indonesian language
- Notable works: Colloquial Jakartan Indonesian; The Indonesian Language: Its History and Role in Modern Society

James Neil Sneddon is an Australian linguist who specializes in Indonesian and languages of Sulawesi.

== Education ==
He studied Linguistics and Indonesian at the University of Sydney. In 1974, he obtained a doctorate from the Australian National University, where he completed his dissertation Tondano Phonology and Grammar. He was an associate professor at Griffith University in Queensland.

== Career ==
Sneddon has written numerous works on the Indonesian language, including grammar textbooks. He is the author of the book Colloquial Jakartan Indonesian, which describes the Jakarta dialect. In the book The Indonesian Language: Its History and Role in Modern Society, he presents the history of the Indonesian language and its function in modern Indonesia.

Sneddon's proto-language reconstructions include Proto-Minahasan and Proto-Sangiric.

== Books ==
- Indonesian Reference Grammar (1996)
- Indonesian: A Comprehensive Grammar (1996)
- Understanding Indonesian Grammar: A Student’s Reference And Workbook. (2000)
- The Indonesian Language: Its History and Role in Modern Society (2003)
- Colloquial Jakartan Indonesian (2006)
