= Kotamobagu Barat =

- Interactive map of Kotamobagu Barat

Kotamobagu West (or Kotamobagu Barat ) is a district in Kotamobagu, North Sulawesi, Indonesia
