= Bondara =

Adult store in the UK

- Type: Private
- Industry: Retail
- Founder: Chris Simms
- Headquarters: Saffron Walden, Essex, United Kingdom
- Products: Lingerie, sex toys, sex aids and bondage gear
- Website: bondara.com

Bondara is one of the UK's largest adult retailers, specialising in the sale of sex toys, lingerie, bondage and erotic gifts.

== History ==
The e-commerce website was launched in 2006 by ex-investment banker Chris Simms, with just a £60,000 investment. Bondara now has an annual turnover of over £10 million with more than 1.5 million orders shipped every year from its 20,000 sq ft warehouse in Saffron Walden, Essex.

== Retail ==
It stocks a wide range of international brands, such as Durex and Fleshlight, as well as its own designs.

Bondara sub-brands include Glacier glass sex toys, Bondara Babes realistic Sex Dolls, Bondara Essentials sex aids and Bondara Flirt lingerie, amongst others.

== Timeline ==
- 2006 – Bondara is launched by ex-investment banker Chris Simms with just a £60,000 investment.
- 2011 – Bondara relocates to a new 20,000 sq ft warehouse in Saffron Walden, Essex, to keep up with growing demand and popularity
- 2012 – Bondara starts stocking packers for transgender inclusivity, with the range later expanding to include breast forms and packer pants.
- 2014 – Bondara features in an episode of ITV2's 'The Office Xmas Party'
- 2014 – Bondara releases information about plans for the 'SexFit'; a wearable cock ring that tracks stamina and sexual performance
- 2015 – In time for the UK's general election, Bondara runs a "General Erection" and creates inflatable sex doll replicas of party leaders David Cameron, Ed Miliband, Nick Clegg, Nigel Farage and Natalie Bennett
- 2015 – Bondara stars in Channel 4's 'Sex Toy Secrets', a six-part miniseries
- 2015 – Bondara builds the "Rubber Throne", a parody of Game of Thrones Iron Throne made from dildos, to celebrate the release of their new 'Game of Bones' range.
- 2015 – Bondara releases a report entitled the 'Future of Sex', in partnership with FuturistDr Ian Pearson
- 2017 – Bondara sponsors the FemDom Ball; an annual, UK-based BDSM event. Bondara continues to sponsor the FemDom Ball in 2018 and 2019.
- 2017 – Bondara becomes one of the first UK retailers to stock its own range of life-size, realistic sex dolls, named the 'Bondara Babes'.
- 2017 – Bondara is the first in the industry to release a Sex Toy Advent Calendar.
- 2018 – Bondara releases a limited-edition rainbow rabbit vibrator for Pride, with 10% of proceeds donated to the LGBT Foundation.
- 2018 – Bondara launches a national survey looking into the UK's sexual fantasies and fetishes.
- 2019 – BBC Radio 1 visits Bondara as one of its 'Approved Workplaces'. Presenter Arielle Free interviews staff and Bondara features on Scott Mills' and Chris Stark's afternoon show.
- 2019 – Bondara and LGBT Foundation collaborate again as Bondara releases a limited-edition rainbow dildo alongside a 'Pride Shop', with 10% of all proceeds donated to charity.
- 2019 – Bondara features in Channel 5's 'The Lesbian Guide to Straight Sex'
- 2020 – Bondara are to sponsor the UK's first Fetish Awards, held in London

== Awards ==
- 2012 Winner– 'Erotic Trade Only' Magazine Best Online Retailer.
- 2015 Winner– 'Erotic Trade Only' Magazine Best Online Retailer.
- 2016 Nominated – 'Erotic Trade Only' Magazine Best Online Retailer.
- 2017 Nominated – 'Erotic Trade Only' Magazine Best Online Retailer.
- 2018 Nominated – 'Erotic Trade Only' Magazine Best Online Retailer.
- 2019 Nominated – 'Erotic Trade Only' Magazine Best Online Retailer.
- 2020 Nominated – 'Erotic Trade Only' Magazine Best Online Retailer.
