= Limboto, Gorontalo =

Coordinates: 0°38′N 122°58′E

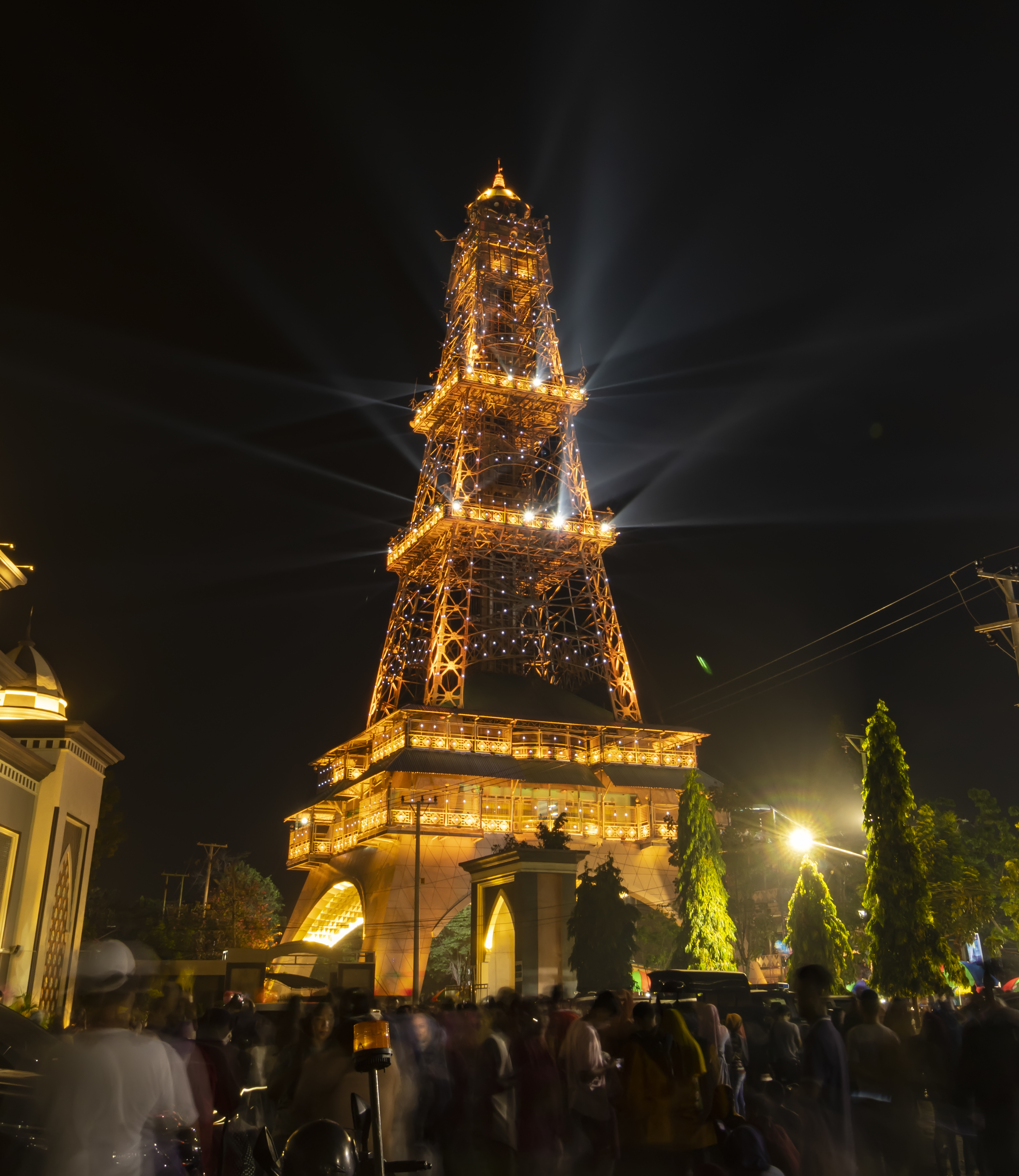
Tower of Majesty at Limboto

Limboto is a town in Indonesia and the administrative centre of Gorontalo Regency.
