= Bintauna language =

Language of North Sulawesi

Bintauna
- Native to: Indonesia
- Region: Bintauna, North Sulawesi
- Native speakers: (11,200 cited 2000 census)
- Language family: Austronesian: Malayo-Polynesian; Philippine; Greater Central Philippine; Gorontalo–Mongondow; Gorontalic; Bintauna

Language codes
- ISO 639-3: bne
- Glottolog: bint1245
- Coordinates: 0.75°N 123.49°E

Bintauna is a Philippine language spoken in North Sulawesi (Celebes), Indonesia.
