= Suwawa language =

Austronesian language spoken in Sulawesi, Indonesia

Suwawa
- Bonda
- Native to: Indonesia
- Region: Gorontalo, North Sulawesi
- Native speakers: 5,000 (2012)
- Language family: Austronesian: Malayo-Polynesian; Philippine; Greater Central Philippine; Gorontalo–Mongondow; Gorontalic; Suwawa
- Writing system: Latin (present); Bonda, Jawi (sometimes)

Language codes
- ISO 639-3: swu
- Glottolog: suwa1241

Suwawa is a Philippine language spoken in Gorontalo and North Sulawesi (Celebes), Indonesia. It is also known as Bonda, Bone, Bunda, Bune, Suvava, and Toewawa. It is spoken by the Suwawa people. The language mostly spoken in Suwawa District, Regency of Bone Bolango.
