= Bolango language =

Austronesian language spoken in Sulawesi, Indonesia

Bolango
- Bulanga-Uki, Diu
- Native to: Indonesia
- Region: Gorontalo, North Sulawesi
- Native speakers: 5,800 (2010)
- Language family: Austronesian: Malayo-Polynesian; Philippine; Greater Central Philippine; Gorontalo–Mongondow; Gorontalic; Bolango
- Dialects: Atinggola

Language codes
- ISO 639-3: bld
- Glottolog: bola1252

Bolango is a Philippine language spoken in North-eastern Sulawesi Indonesia. In 1981 it was spoken by some 20,000 people, 5,000 in Bolango and 15,000 in Atinggola.
