= Kotamobagu =

City in North Sulawesi, Indonesia

- City
- City of Kotamobagu; Kota Kotamobagu
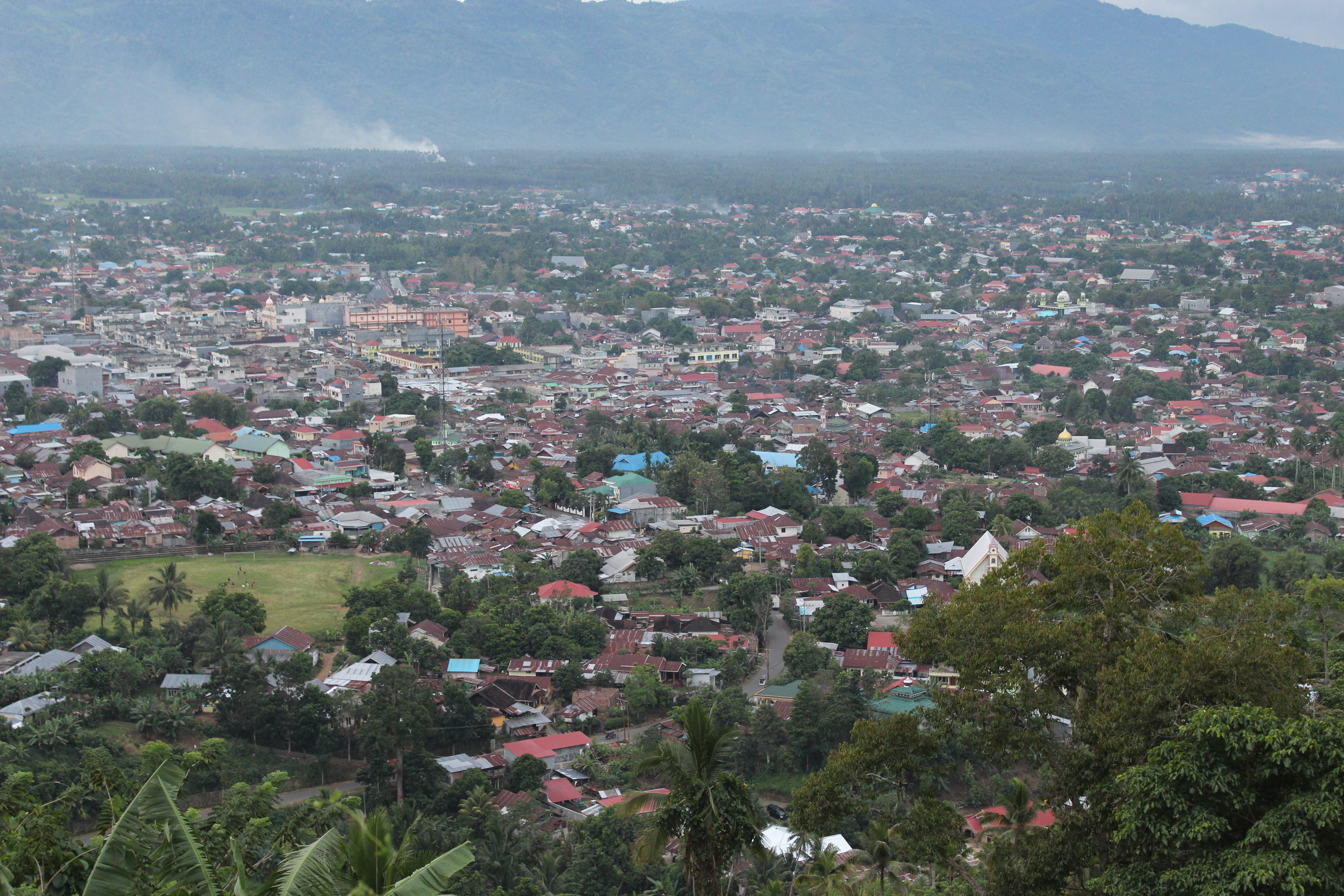
- Aerial view of Kotamobagu

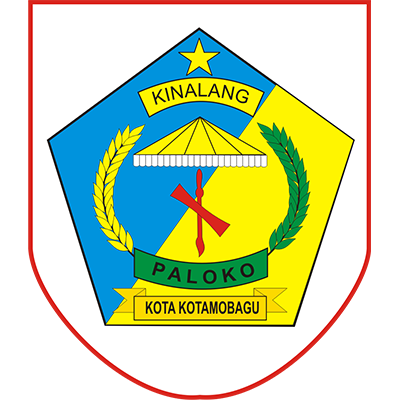
- Coat of arms

- Location within North Sulawesi
- Interactive map of Kotamobagu
- Location in Sulawesi and Indonesia Kotamobagu (Indonesia)
- Coordinates: 0°44′N 124°19′E
- Country: Indonesia
- Province: North Sulawesi

Government
  - Mayor: Weny Gaib
  - Vice Mayor: Rendi Mangkat

Area
  - Total: 108.89 km^{2} (42.04 sq mi)

Population (mid 2025 estimate)
  - Total: 121,756
  - Density: 1,118.2/km^{2} (2,896.0/sq mi)
- Time zone: UTC+8 (Indonesia Central Time)
- Area code: (+62) 434
- Website: kotamobagukota

Kotamobagu is a landlocked city in North Sulawesi, Indonesia. Having previously been a town within the Bolaang Mongondow Regency, Kotamobagu was separated from that regency on 2 January 2007 to become an autonomous city. It is the principal centre of the southern part of the province, the Bolaang Mongondow region, which has been under consideration by the Indonesian government to be separated from the rest of North Sulawesi and formed into a separate province. The city covers an area of 108.89 km^{2}, and had a population of 107,459 at the 2010 Census, rising to 123,722 at the 2020 Census; the official estimate as at mid 2025 was 121,756 (comprising 62,396 males and 59,360 females).

Under consideration by the Indonesian Government since 2013 (but all such new creations have been held in abeyance since then) is the formation of a new province that would re-unite those territories which were part of the original Bolaang Mongondow Regency before 2007; it was intended that once the Province of "Bolaang Mongondow Raya" (Greater Bolaang Mongondow) is created, Kotamobagu will be approved as the new provincial capital.

== Administrative districts ==
The city is divided into four districts (kecamatan) tabulated below with their areas and their population as at the 2010 Census and the 2020 Census, together with the official estimates as at mid 2025. The table also includes the location of the district centres, the number of administrative villages in each district (18 classed as urban kelurahan and 15 as rural desa), and its postal codes.

Kode Wilayah	Name of District (kecamatan)	Area in km^{2}	Pop'n Census 2010	Pop'n Census 2020	Pop'n Estimate mid 2025	Admin centre	No. of villages	Post codes
71.74.03	Kotamobagu Selatan (South Kotamobagu)	56.87	28,030	33,353	33,594	Poyowa Besar	9 ^{(a)}	95717
71.74.02	Kotamobagu Timur (East Kotamobagu)	26.56	26,355	30,904	30,523	Kotobangon	10 ^{(b)}	95712 - 95719
71.74.04	Kotamobagu Barat (West Kotamobagu)	15.97	37,678	41,843	40,289	Mongkonai Barat	6 ^{(c)}	95711 - 95716
71.74.01	Kotamobagu Utara (North Kotamobagu)	9.49	15,396	17,622	17,350	Bilalang 1	8 ^{(d)}	95713 - 95714
	Totals	108.89	107,459	123,722	121,756		33	

Notes: (a) including 3 kelurahan - Mongondow, Motoboi Kecil and Pobundayan. (b) including 6 kelurahan - Kobo Besar, Kotabangun, Matali, Motoboi Besar, Sinindia and Tumbui.
(c) all 6 are kelurahan - Gogagoman, Kotamobagu, Molinow, Mogolaing, Mongkonai and Mongkonai Barat. (d) including 3 kelurahan - Biga, Genggulang and Upai.

== Autonomy ==
As an autonomous city, in 2011 Kotamobagu was judged the best autonomous area from among 57 autonomous areas which have been formed by central government since 2007.

== Climate ==
Kotamobagu has a tropical rainforest climate (Af) with moderate rainfall in August and September and heavy rainfall in the remaining months.

Climate data for Kotamobagu
Month	Jan	Feb	Mar	Apr	May	Jun	Jul	Aug	Sep	Oct	Nov	Dec	Year
Mean daily maximum °C (°F)	28.8 (83.8)	28.8 (83.8)	29.1 (84.4)	29.8 (85.6)	29.7 (85.5)	29.6 (85.3)	29.4 (84.9)	30.0 (86.0)	30.4 (86.7)	30.5 (86.9)	30.1 (86.2)	29.3 (84.7)	29.6 (85.3)
Daily mean °C (°F)	25.0 (77.0)	24.9 (76.8)	25.2 (77.4)	25.6 (78.1)	25.7 (78.3)	25.6 (78.1)	25.3 (77.5)	25.5 (77.9)	25.5 (77.9)	25.6 (78.1)	25.7 (78.3)	25.3 (77.5)	25.4 (77.7)
Mean daily minimum °C (°F)	21.2 (70.2)	21.1 (70.0)	21.4 (70.5)	21.4 (70.5)	21.8 (71.2)	21.6 (70.9)	21.3 (70.3)	21.1 (70.0)	20.7 (69.3)	20.8 (69.4)	21.4 (70.5)	21.4 (70.5)	21.3 (70.3)
Average rainfall mm (inches)	216 (8.5)	179 (7.0)	186 (7.3)	201 (7.9)	211 (8.3)	174 (6.9)	134 (5.3)	93 (3.7)	94 (3.7)	136 (5.4)	204 (8.0)	197 (7.8)	2,025 (79.8)
Source: Climate-Data.org
