= Kaidipang language =

Austronesian language spoken in Sulawesi, Indonesia

Kaidipang
- Native to: Indonesia
- Region: North Sulawesi
- Native speakers: (27,000 cited 2000 census)
- Language family: Austronesian: Malayo-Polynesian; Philippine; Greater Central Philippine; Gorontalo–Mongondow; Gorontalic; Kaidipang
- Dialects: Bolaang Itang

Language codes
- ISO 639-3: kzp
- Glottolog: kaid1239

Kaidipang is a Philippine language spoken in North Sulawesi (Celebes), Indonesia.
