= Lolak language =

Austronesian language spoken in Sulawesi, Indonesia

Lolak
- Native to: Indonesia
- Region: North Sulawesi
- Native speakers: < 50 (2017)
- Language family: Austronesian: Malayo-Polynesian; Philippine; Greater Central Philippine; Gorontalo–Mongondow; Gorontalic; Lolak

Language codes
- ISO 639-3: llq
- Glottolog: lola1250
- ELP: Lolak

Lolak is a Philippine language spoken in Lolak town, Bolaang Mongondow Regency, North Sulawesi (Celebes), Indonesia. There are fewer than 50 speakers.
