= Gorontalo–Mongondow languages =

Subgroup of the Austronesian language family

Gorontalo–Mongondow
- Geographic distribution: Gorontalo, parts of North Sulawesi and Central Sulawesi provinces, Indonesia
- Linguistic classification: Austronesian: Malayo-Polynesian; Philippine; Greater Central Philippine; Gorontalo–Mongondow
- Proto-language: Proto-Gorontalo–Mongondow
- Subdivisions: Gorontalic; Mongondowic

Language codes
- Glottolog: goro1257
- Map of languages on the island of Sulawesi, Gorontalic languages is colored in pink along with Mongondowic languages.

The Gorontalo–Mongondow languages are a group of Austronesian languages spoken in northern Sulawesi, Indonesia.

== Languages ==
The Gorontalo–Mongondow languages are divided into two branches:

- Gorontalo–Mongondow
  - Gorontalic
    - Atinggola
    - Bolango
    - Buol
    - Bintauna
    - Gorontalo
      - Limboto
      - Tilamuta
    - Kaidipang
    - Lolak
    - Suwawa
  - Mongondowic
    - Mongondow
    - Ponosakan

== Classification ==
Similarities between Mongondow and the languages of the Philippines were already recognized in the first half of the 20th century. Noorduyn (1982) presented phonological and morphological evidence for a close connection between Gorontalo and Mongondow, while the full extent of the subgroup including all other Gorontalic languages was established by Usup (1986). Blust (1991) has shown that the Gorontalo–Mongondow languages link up with many languages of the central and southern Philippines in the Greater Central Philippine subgroup. The following table exemplifies the close relationship, listing Greater Central Philippine innovations which are found in Mongondow (representing the Gorontalo–Mongondow languages) and Tagalog (the northernmost member of the Greater Central Philippine subgroup):

Mongondow	Tagalog	Meaning
modaliʔ-daliʔ	madalíʔ	'quick'
modolom	madilím	'dark'
duguʔ	dugóʔ	'blood'
obuʔ	ubó	'cough'
pugad	púgad	'nest'
tapaʔ	sápaʔ	'brook'
tubig	túbig	'water'

== Reconstruction ==
Proto-Gorontalo–Mongondow
- Reconstruction of: Gorontalo–Mongondow languages
- Reconstructed ancestors: Proto-Austronesian: Proto-Malayo-Polynesian; Proto-Philippine

The lexicon and phonology of Proto-Gorontalo-Mongondow has been reconstructed by Usup (1986). Proto-Gorontalo-Mongondow pronouns have been reconstructed by Lobel (2011).

=== Sound changes ===
Initial sound changes from Proto-Greater Central Philippine:

- *ə > *o
- *N[-hom.]P > *N[+hom.]P
- in reduplications *C¹C² > *C²
- *a > *o in the first syllable of reduplications

Modern outcomes in Gorontalo-Mongondowic languages
Gorontalic							Mongondowic	
Gorontalo	Buol	Kaidipang	Suwawa	Atinggola	Bolango	Bintauna	Mongondow	Ponosakan
*ay > e							*ay > oy	
*aw > o							*aw > ow	
*iw > i							*iw > uy	
*C# > Co								
*b / _*u > h	*b / _*u > v							
*a / _# > o								
*n# > ∅, lo, ngo	*n# > ∅, n, ng	*n# > ∅						
*o > u / {*b, *d, *g}_								
*a > o / *b_	*a > o / {*b, *d, *g}_							
*a > e / {*d, *g}_	*a > o / {*b, *d, *g}_							
*mb, *nd > m, n								
	*ŋg > ng							
*s > t			*s > t				*s > t	
*P[-voice] > P[+voice] / *N_								
*#V > wV			*#V > wV	*#V > wV				
*#i > yi			*#i > yi	*#V > wV				
*k > ʔ			*k > ʔ					
*r > l		*r > h						
*n > l								
*s > d / *N_		*s > j / *N_						
*g > h						*g > k		*g > h
						*b > v, *d > r		*b > w, *d > r

== See also ==
- Languages of Sulawesi
- Minahasan languages
- Sangiric languages
