= North Bolaang Mongondow Regency =

Regency in North Sulawesi, Indonesia

Coordinates: 0.8938°N 123.3357°E

North Bolaang Mongondow Regency Kabupaten Bolaang Mongondow Utara
- Regency
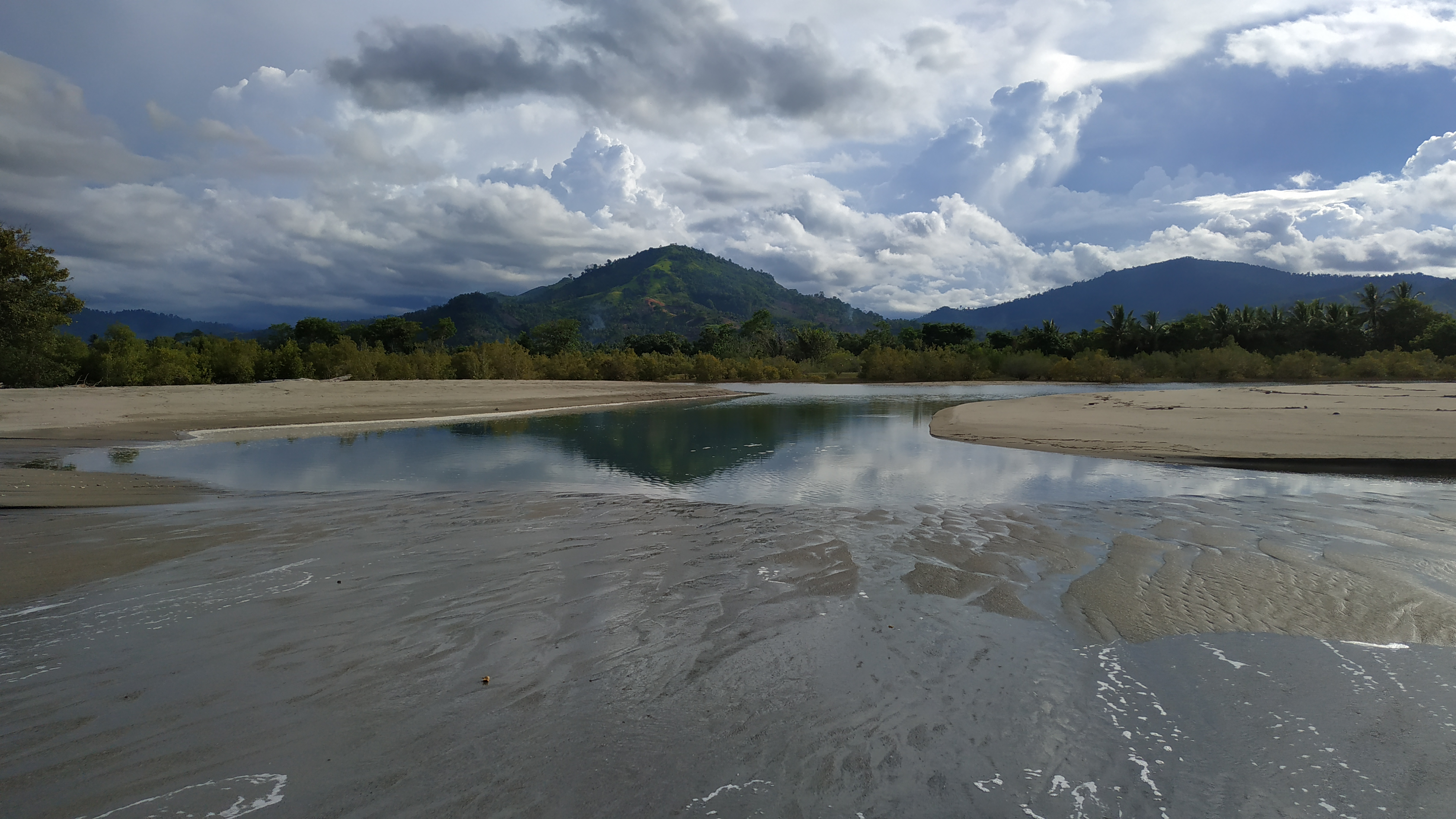
- Panagu Beach in North Bolaang Mongondow Regency

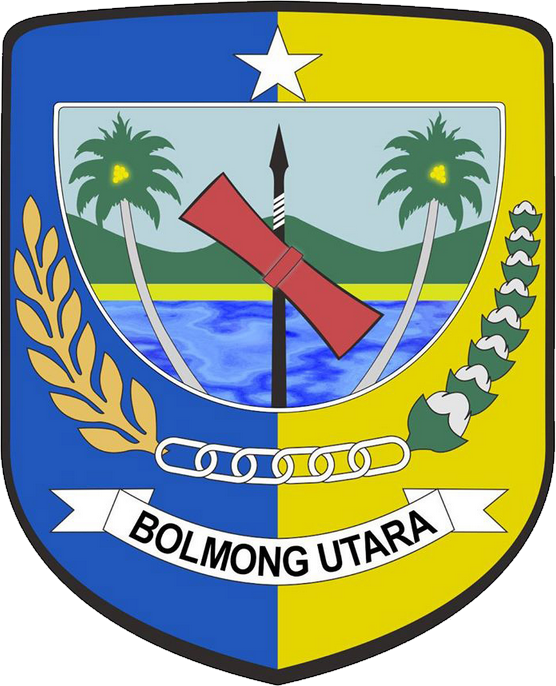
- Coat of arms

- Location in North Sulawesi
- Country: Indonesia
- Province: North Sulawesi
- Capital: Boroko

Government
  - Regent: Sirajudin Lasena
  - Vice Regent: Mohammad Aditya Pontoh

Area
  - Total: 1,643.86 km^{2} (634.70 sq mi)

Population (mid 2025 estimate)
  - Total: 88,993
  - Density: 54.137/km^{2} (140.21/sq mi)
- Time zone: UTC+7 (WIB)
- Website: bolmutkab.go.id

North Bolaang Mongondow Regency is a regency of North Sulawesi Province of Indonesia. It was created on 2 January 2007 by splitting off districts which had previously been the western part of Bolaang Mongondow Regency. The regency covers a land area of 1,643.86 km^{2} and had a population of 70,693 at the 2010 Census and 83,112 at the 2020 Census; the official estimate as at mid 2025 was 88,993 (comprising 45,673 males and 43,320 females). Bitauna is the only official town (kelurahan) in the regency, but the regency's administrative centre is in the village of Boroko.

== Administration ==
The Regency is divided into six districts (kecamatan), which are tabulated below with their areas and their populations at the 2010 Census and 2020 Census, together with the official estimates as at mid 2025. The table also includes the locations of the district administrative centres, the number of administrative villages in each district (a total of 106 rural desa and a single urban kelurahan), and its postal codes.

Kode Wilayah	Name of District (kecamatan)	Area in km^{2}	Pop'n Census 2010	Pop'n Census 2020	Pop'n Estimate mid 2025	Admin centre	No. of villages	Post codes
71.08.01	Sangkub	354.85	8,906	11,100	11,214	Sangkub 1	16	95762
71.08.02	Bitauna	348.94	11,253	14,858	15,346	Bitauna ^{(a)}	16	95763
71.08.03	Bolang Itang Timur ^{(b)} (East Bolong Itang)	293.75	12,859	15,027	16,344	Bohabak 1	20	95767
71.08.04	Bolong Itang Barat (West Bolong Itang)	445.64	14,042	16,038	17,148	Bolangitang	18	95764
71.08.05	Kaidipang ^{(c)}	85.09	12,334	14,714	16,167	Boroko	15	95765
71.08.06	Pinogaluman ^{(d)}	115.59	9,898	11,646	12,774	Buko	22	95766
	Totals	1,643.86	70,693	83,112	88,993		107	

Notes: (a) the town of Bitauna is the sole kelurahan in the regency. (b) Bolang Itang Timur District includes the offshore island of Pulau Nunuka.
(c) Kaidipang District includes two offshore islands - Pulau Damar and Pulau Tikus. (d) Pinogaluman District includes three offshore islands - Pulau Anuling, Pulau Bongkil and Pulau Keramat.
