= Greater Central Philippine languages =

Subgroup of the Austronesian language family

Greater Central Philippine
- Geographic distribution: Philippines; Indonesia (Northern Sulawesi and northern coastal parts of North Kalimantan); Malaysia (Sabah)
- Linguistic classification: Austronesian: Malayo-Polynesian; Philippine?; Greater Central Philippine
- Proto-language: Proto-Greater Central Philippine
- Subdivisions: Central Philippine; South Mangyan; Palawanic; Subanen; Danao; Manobo; Gorontalo–Mongondow

Language codes
- Glottolog: grea1284

The Greater Central Philippine languages are a proposed subgroup of the Austronesian language family, defined by the change of Proto-Malayo-Polynesian *R to *g. They are spoken in the central and southern parts of the Philippines and in northern Sulawesi, Indonesia. This subgroup was first proposed by Robert Blust (1991) based on lexical and phonological evidence, and is accepted by most specialists in the field.

Most of the major languages of the Philippines belong to the Greater Central Philippine subgroup: Tagalog, the Visayan languages Cebuano, Hiligaynon, Waray; Central Bikol, the Danao languages Maranao and Magindanaon. On the island of Sulawesi, Indonesia, Gorontalo is the third-largest language by number of speakers.

== History ==
According to Blust, the current distribution of the Greater Central Philippine languages is the result of an expansion that occurred around 500 B.C. and which led to levelling of much of the linguistic diversity in the central and southern Philippines.

Remnants of this earlier diversity can still be found in relic areas within the Greater Central Philippine area, viz. Manide in southern Luzon, Ati on Panay, the North Mangyan languages on Mindoro, the Kalamian languages in northern Palawan and the South Mindanao languages.

== Classification ==
The Greater Central Philippine subgroup comprises the following microgroups:

- Central Philippine languages (including Tagalog, Bikol languages, and Bisayan languages)
- South Mangyan languages
- Palawanic languages
- Subanen languages
- Danao languages (including Maranao and Magindanao)
- Manobo languages
- Gorontalo–Mongondow languages (including Gorontalo and Mongondow)
- Umiray Dumagat

== See also ==
- Philippine languages
