= Manado Malay =

Creole language spoken in Manado

- Bahasa Manado
- Native to: Indonesia
- Region: North Sulawesi
- Native speakers: (850,000 cited 2001)
- Language family: Malay Creole: Eastern Indonesia Malay; Manado Malay
- Writing system: Latin

Language codes
- ISO 639-3: xmm
- Glottolog: mala1481

Manado Malay, Manadonese, or simply the Manado language, is a creole language spoken in Manado, the capital of North Sulawesi province in Indonesia, and the surrounding area. The local name of the language is bahasa Manado, and the name Minahasa Malay is also used, after the main ethnic group speaking the language. Since Manado Malay is used primarily for spoken communication, there is no standard orthography.

Manado Malay differs from standard Malay in having numerous Portuguese, Dutch, Spanish, and Ternate loan words, as well as having traits such as its use of kita as a first person singular pronoun, rather than as a first person inclusive plural pronoun. It is derived from North Moluccan Malay (Ternate Malay), which can be evidenced by the number of Ternate loanwords in its lexicon. For example, the pronouns ngana ('you', singular) and ngoni ('you', plural) are of Ternate–Tidore origin. Manado Malay has been displacing the indigenous languages of the area.

== Phonology ==
=== Vowels ===
The vowel system of Manado Malay consists of five vowel phonemes.

Manado Malay vowels
	Front	Central	Back
High	i		u
Mid	e	ə (Note: Used in Indonesian loanwords, or the product of weakened unstressed vowels in some dialect.)	o
Low		a	

=== Consonants ===
Manado Malay has nineteen consonants and two semivowels.

Manado Malay consonants
	Labial	Alveolar	Palatal	Velar	Glottal
Nasal	m	n	ɲ	ŋ	
Plosive	p b	t d	c	k ɡ	ʔ
Fricative	f v	s			h
Lateral		l			
Trill		r			
Semivowel	w		j		

=== Letter-to-sound correspondences ===
==== Consonants ====
Non-digraphs
Letter	IPA	Examples	Word meaning
b	[b]	budo'	(adj., adv.) light-skinned
c	[t͡ʃ]	cokodidi	(adj., v.) hyperactive person — in the sense of "could not sit still"
d	[d]	dodu'	(n., v.) hiccup
f	[f]	falo-falo	(n.) water dipper
v (interchangeable with f)	[f]	veto	(v.) to rebuke
g	[ɡ]	goro	(n.) rubber (material), rubber band
h	[h]	haga	(v.) to stare
j	[d͡ʒ]	jatung	(v.) to fall down
k	[k]	karlota	(adj., n., v.) gossipy, gossip, or to gossip — a slang that emerged in the 1990s, thanks to Carlota, a gossipy servant in María la del Barrio.
l	[l]	li'u	(v.) to trip on one foot only
m	[m]	mner	(n.) mister, sir
n	[n]	nae	(adj., v.) to go up, to move up
p	[p]	parampuang	(n., adj., v.) female, feminine
r	[r]	rabu-rabu	(adj., v., adv.) quick in a hurried manner
s	[s]	s'hal	(n.) bowl, basin
t	[t]	tindis	(v.) to press
w	[w]	wowo'	(adj., v.) mute person
y	[j]	yaki	(n.) Celebes crested macaque — having the connotation of "stupid" or "dirty" if used in comparison with a person
z (usually used in loanwords)	[z]	zigzag	(adj., v.) zigzag
' (very rarely written)	[ʔ]	nyanda'	(det.) no

Digraphs
Letter sequence	IPA	Examples	Word meaning
kh (very rare, mostly realized as [k])	[x]	khas	(adj.) special, unique to
kw	[kʷ]	kwa'	(int.) particle that is used to express pity, frustration, or assertion when one didn't follow the locutor's suggestions or commands (ex. So bilang akang kwa' mar ngana cuma jba kabal! "I told you but you just won't listen!")
ky	[c]	kyapa	(adv., int.) why
ng	[ŋ]	ngale-ngale	(adj., adv.) leisurely slow
ny	[ɲ]	nyong	(n.) boy
sy (starting to become outdated), sh (modern)	[ʃ]	syalom / shalom	(int.) Shalom

==== Vowels ====
Non-diphthong
Letter	IPA	Examples	Word meaning	Note
a	[a]	aju	(v.) to mockingly mimic someone	
e	[e]	enteru	(adj., adv.) all, whole	Often realized as /ɛ/
e	[ə]	empedu	(n.) bile	Must be a loanword (either from Indonesian, English, or other languages) to be truly realized as /ə/, otherwise would disappear or shift to /a/ or /o/. Some accent (like Tomohon or Tondano) tend to preserve the sound from loanwords when compared to the others (such as Manado) where it would shift. But given the nationalization of Indonesian, the younger generation starts to implement more /ə/ in their speech, fully or partially decreolizing the words.
i	[i]	iyo	(det.) yes	
o	[o]	ofor	(v.) to pass or hand something over	
u	[o]	uba	(n.) medicine	

=== Stress ===
Most words in Manado Malay have stress on the pre-final syllable:

kadera	'chair'
stenga	'half'
doi	'money'

However, there are also many words with final stress:

butúl	'right, correct, true'
tolór	'egg; testicle'
capát	'fast'

Note that the accents is not used in everyday writing; just to indicate the stressed syllable.

== Grammar ==
=== Pronouns ===
==== Personal ====
Pronoun	Standard Indonesian	Manado Malay
First singular	aku	kita
First plural	kami/kita	torang
Second singular	kamu	ngana
Second plural	kalian	ngoni
Third singular	dia	dia
Third plural	mereka	dorang

==== Possessives ====
Possessives are built by adding pe to the personal pronoun or name or noun, then followed by the 'possessed' noun. Thus pe has the function similar to English "'s" as in "the doctor's uniform".

English	Manado Malay
My friend	kita pe tamáng / ta pe tamáng
Your (sing.) friend	ngana pe tamáng / nga pe tamáng
His/her book	dia pe buku / de pe buku
This book is yours (sing.)	ini ngana pe buku

=== Interrogative words ===
The following are the interrogative words or "w-words" in Manado Malay:

English	Manado Malay
why	kyapa
where	(di) mana
who	sapa
which one(s)	tu mana, yang mana

=== Grammatical aspect ===
Ada ('to be') can be used in Manado Malay to indicate the perfective aspect, e.g.:

- Dorang ada turung pigi ka Wenang = 'They already went down to Wenang (the indigenous name for Manado)'
- Torang so makang = 'We ate already' or 'We have eaten already'

=== Nasal final ===
The final nasals /m/ and /n/ in Indonesian are replaced by the "-ng" group in Manado Malay, similar to the Terengganu dialect of Malaysia (as well as other languages in Sulawesi such as Buginese and Makassarese), e.g.:

- makang (Indonesian makan) = 'to eat',
- jalang (Indonesian jalan) = 'to walk',
- sirang (Indonesian siram) = 'to shower', etc.

=== Prefix ===
==== "ba-" prefix ====
The ber- prefix in Indonesian, which serves a function similar to the English -ing, is modified into ba- in Manado Malay. E.g.: bajalang (berjalan, 'walking'), batobo (berenang, 'swimming'), batolor (bertelur, 'laying eggs')

==== "ma(°)-" prefix ====
° = ng, n, or m depending on phonological context.

The me(°)- prefix in standard Indonesian, which also serves a function to make a verb active, is modified into ma(°)- in Manado Malay. E.g.: mangael (mengail, 'hooking fish'), manari (menari, 'dancing'), mancari (mencari, 'searching'), mamasa (memasak, 'cooking'), manangis (menangis, 'crying').

== Influences ==
=== Foreign loanwords ===
Due to the historical presence of the Dutch and the Portuguese in eastern Indonesia, several Manado Malay words originate from their languages. However, there is little influence from the local Minahasan languages, and borrowings from Spanish are not very prominent either – in spite of the historical Spanish dominance – suggesting that Manado Malay was transplanted from outside the Minahasa region. On the other hand, Portuguese influence is comparatively significant, considering that the Portuguese presence in the area was relatively limited. There is also some influence of loanwords from another Austronesian language group called Gorontalo–Mongondow languages. There is also a layer of loanwords from the non-Austronesian language of Ternate, which was controlled by the Portuguese in the period 1512–1655.

Standard Indonesian	Manado Malay loanword	Source language	Source word	English
topi	capeo	Portuguese	chapéu	cap, hat
bosan	fastiu, pastiu	Portuguese	fastio	bored
untuk	for, por	Dutch	voor	for
garpu	fork, forok	Dutch	vork	fork
tenggorokan	gargantang	Portuguese	garganta	throat
kursi	kadera	Portuguese	cadeira	chair
bendera	bandera	Portuguese	bandeira	flag
saputangan	lenso	Portuguese	lenço	handkerchief
tapi	mar	Dutch	maar	but
jagung	milu	Portuguese	milho	corn, maize
sudah	klar	Dutch	klaar	finished
paman	om	Dutch	oom	uncle
nenek	oma	Dutch	oma	grandmother
kakek	opa	Dutch	opa	grandfather
teduh	(ba)sombar	Portuguese	sombra	shade
keringat	suar	Portuguese	suar	sweat
bibi	tante	Dutch	tante	aunt
dahi	testa	Portuguese	testa	forehead, temple
penyu	tuturuga, tuturaga	Portuguese	tartaruga	turtle
sepatu	chapatu, sapatu, spatu	Portuguese	sapato	shoe(s)
kebun	kintál	Portuguese	quintal	(agricultural) field or garden

=== Indonesian loanwords from Manado Malay ===
Several words in Manado Malay are loaned to standard Indonesian:

- baku (which indicates reciprocality) e.g.: baku hantam ('to punch each other'), baku ajar ('to hit each other'), Originally a loanword from Ternate, it has spread through Manado Malay into other regions of Indonesia.

== Examples ==
Examples :

- Kita or ta = I
- Ngana or na = you
- Torang or tong = we
- Dorang or dong = they
- Io = yes
- Nyanda’, nda' = no (' = glottal stop)

Sentences :

- Kita/ta pe mama da pi ka pasar : My mother went to the market
- Nyanda’/Nda’ makang Ngana dari kalamareng. : You haven't eaten since yesterday.
- Jang badusta ngana pa kita! : Don't lie to me!

Note that the apostrophe (') is not used in everyday writing; just to indicate the glottal stop.

== Works cited ==
- Allen, Robert B. Jr.; Hayami-Allen, Rika (2002). "Orientation in the Spice Islands" (PDF). In Macken, Marlys (ed.). Papers from the Tenth Annual Meeting of the Southeast Asian Linguistics Society. Tempe: Program for Southeast Asian Studies, Arizona State University. pp. 21–38. ISBN 1-881044-29-7. OCLC 50506465. Archived from the original (PDF) on 2022-12-25.
- Bowden, John (2005). "Language Contact and Metatypic Restructuring in the Directional System of North Maluku Malay" (PDF). Concentric: Studies in Linguistics. 31 (2): 133–158. doi:10.6241/concentric.ling.200512_31(2).0006.
- Henley, David (1996). Nationalism and regionalism in a colonial context: Minahasa in the Dutch East Indies. Leiden: KITLV Press.
- Prentice, Jack (1994). "Manado Malay: Product and agent of language change". In Dutton, Tom; Tryon, Darrell T. (eds.). Language Contact and Change in the Austronesian World. Berlin: Walter de Gruyter. pp. 411–442. doi:10.1515/9783110883091.411. ISBN 978-3-11-012786-7.
- Schouten, M. J. C. (1998). Leadership and social mobility in a Southeast Asian society: Minahasa, 1677–1983. Leiden: KITLV Press. pp. 39–40.
- Stoel, Ruben (2007). "The Intonation of Manado Malay". In van Heuven, Vincent J.; van Zanten, Ellen (eds.). Prosody in Indonesian Languages. LOT Occasional Series, Vol. 9. Utrecht: LOT, Netherlands Graduate School of Linguistics. pp. 117–150. CiteSeerX 10.1.1.464.9608. ISBN 978-90-78328-44-5.
- Warouw, Martha Salea (1985). Kamus Manado-Indonesia (PDF). Jakarta: Pusat Pembinaan dan Pengembangan Bahasa.
