= List of current senators of the Regional Representative Council =

Composition of the Regional Representative Council between 2024 and 2029 (DPD) (Note: Each member of the Regional Representative Council (DPD), despite having close affiliations with political parties, are elected on a non-partisan basis, as members are barred from affiliating with political parties.)

The Regional Representative Council of Indonesia is the upper house of the People's Consultative Assembly, the legislative branch of the Indonesian government. Following the 2019 Indonesian legislative election, there were 136 seats within the assembly, all of which consisted of non-partisan members, each representing a province; 4 members were elected from each province. The total increased to 152 members for the 2024 Indonesian legislative election, due to the creation of an additional 4 provinces in 2022. The leader of the DPD is the Speaker, a position which is currently held by Sultan Bachtiar Najamudin. In addition, the speaker is joined with three deputy speakers, namely Gusti Kanjeng Ratu Hemas, Yorrys Raweyai, and Tamsil Linrung.

Members of the DPD are known as senators, and are elected in a general election once every five years. Each province of Indonesia elects 4 senators to the DPD on a non-partisan basis, as the DPD represents the interests of their provinces rather than that of the parties, although many candidates had former affiliations with political parties. The following is a complete list of currently serving senators in the DPD, following the 2024 Indonesian general election, consisting of 152 senators, representing 38 provinces.

== Current leadership ==
Speaker	Deputy Speaker	Deputy Speaker	Deputy Speaker
Sultan Bachtiar Najamudin Bengkulu	Gusti Kanjeng Ratu Hemas Yogyakarta	Yorrys Raweyai Central Papua	Tamsil Linrung South Sulawesi
Source: Regional Representative Council

== Current senators ==
=== Sumatra ===
==== Aceh ====
#	Portrait	Name	Votes received
1		Tgk Ahmada	207,464
2		Azhari Cage	150,934
3		Darwati Abdul Gani	184,528
4		Sudirman Haji Uma	1,060,991
Source: Regional Representative Council

==== North Sumatra ====
#	Portrait	Name	Votes received
1		Badikenita Sitepu	553,752
2		Dedi Iskandar Batubara	1,081,487
3		Muhammad Nuh	618,241
4		Penrad Siagian	642,165
Source: Regional Representative Council

==== West Sumatra ====
#	Portrait	Name	Votes received
1		Cerint Iralloza Tasya	283,020
2		Irman Gusman	176,987
3		Jelita Donal	187,765
4		Muslim M. Yatim	199,919
Source: Regional Representative Council

==== Riau ====
#	Portrait	Name	Votes received
1		Abdul Hamid	189,171
2		Arif Eka Saputra	271,518
3		Muhammad Mursyid	262,889
4		Sewitri	219,168
Source: Regional Representative Council

==== Riau Islands ====
#	Portrait	Name	Votes received
1		Dharma Setiawan	172,868
2		Dwi Ajeng Sekar Respaty	111,920
3		Ismeth Abdullah	132,563
4		Ria Saptarika	162,400
Source: Regional Representative Council

==== Jambi ====
#	Portrait	Name	Votes received
1		Abu Bakar Jamalia (Note: Replaced M. Syukur, who resigned 18 September 2024 to run for Merangin regent.)	140,945
2		Elviana	291,334
3		Ivanda Awalina Firdausi Sukandar	272,892
4		M. Sum Indra	166,140
Source: Regional Representative Council

==== South Sumatra ====
#	Portrait	Name	Votes received
1		Amaliah	528,749
2		Eva Susanti	508,540
3		Jialyka Maharani	549,140
4		Ratu Tenny Leriva	833,799
Source: Regional Representative Council

==== Bangka Belitung Islands ====
#	Portrait	Name	Votes received
1		Bahar Buasan	102,065
2		Darmansyah Husein	80,188
3		Dinda Rembulan	86,813
4		Zuhri M. Syazali	116,051
Source: Regional Representative Council

==== Bengkulu ====
#	Portrait	Name	Votes received
1		Destita Khairilisani	201,888
2		Elisa Ermasari	325,842
3		Leni Haryati John Latief	129,045
4		Sultan Bachtiar Najamudin	129,495
Source: Regional Representative Council

==== Lampung ====
#	Portrait	Name	Votes received
1		Abdul Hakim	448,702
2		Ahmad Bastian	484,996
3		Almira Nabila Fauzi (Note: Replaced Jihan Nurlela, who resigned 29 August 2024 to run for Lampung vice governor.)	404,579
4		Bustami Zainudin	431,702
Source: Regional Representative Council

=== Java ===
==== Banten ====
#	Portrait	Name	Votes received
1		Abdi Sumaithi	568,577
2		Ade Yuliasih	443,036
3		Andiara Aprilia Hikmat	1,049,928
4		Ali Alwi	488,317
Source: Regional Representative Council

==== Jakarta ====
#	Portrait	Name	Votes received
1		Achmad Azran	456,247
2		Dailami Firdaus	613,721
3		Fahira Idris	745,841
4		Happy Djarot	656,815
Source: Regional Representative Council

==== West Java ====
#	Portrait	Name	Votes received
1		Aanya Rina Casmayanti	1,976,561
2		Agita Nurfianti	1,168,837
3		Alfiansyah Komeng	5,399,699
4		Jihan Fahira	1,823,907
Source: Regional Representative Council

==== Central Java ====
#	Portrait	Name	Votes received
1		Abdul Kholik	2,160,469
2		Casytha Arriwi Kathmandu	3,567,338
3		Denty Eka Widi Pratiwi	1,929,267
4		Muhdi (Note: Replaced Taj Yasin Maimoen, who resigned 28 August 2024 to run for Central Java vice governor.)	1,628,507
Source: Regional Representative Council

==== Yogyakarta ====
#	Portrait	Name	Votes received
1		Ahmad Syauqi Soeratno	398,903
2		Gusti Kanjeng Ratu Hemas	777,912
3		Hilmy Muhammad	323,080
4		Yashinta Sekarwangi Mega	470,211
Source: Regional Representative Council

==== East Java ====
#	Portrait	Name	Votes received
1		La Nyalla Mattalitti	3,132,076
2		Ahmad Nawardi	3,281,105
3		Kondang Kusumaning Ayu	2,542,036
4		Lia Istifhama	2,739,123
Source: Regional Representative Council

=== Lesser Sunda Islands ===
==== Bali ====
#	Portrait	Name	Votes received
1		I Komang Merta Jiwa	363,440
2		Ida Bagus Rai Dharmawijaya Mantra	494,698
3		Niluh Djelantik	377,152
4		Arya Wedakarna	378,300
Source: Regional Representative Council

==== West Nusa Tenggara ====
#	Portrait	Name	Votes received
1		Evi Apita Maya	315,007
2		Ibnu Halil	328,713
3		Mirah Midadan Fahmid	265,104
4		Muhammad Rifki Farabi	284,126
Source: Regional Representative Council

==== East Nusa Tenggara ====
#	Portrait	Name	Votes received
1		Abraham Liyanto	279,392
2		Angelius Wake Kako	362,645
3		Hilda Manafe	267,195
4		Maria Stevi Harman	405,579
Source: Regional Representative Council

=== Kalimantan ===
==== West Kalimantan ====
#	Portrait	Name	Votes received
1		Daud Yordan	527,697
2		Erlinawati	369,961
3		Maria Goreti	276,562
4		Syarif Melvin	399,273
Source: Regional Representative Council

==== Central Kalimantan ====
#	Portrait	Name	Votes received
1		Agustin Teras Narang	366,226
2		Erni Daryanti	168,413
3		Habib Said Abdurrahman	169,599
4		Siti Aseanti	118,892
Source: Regional Representative Council

==== South Kalimantan ====
#	Portrait	Name	Votes received
1		Gusti Hasan Aman	301,738
2		Habib Hamid Abdullah	269,903
3		Habib Zakaria Bahasyim	415,223
4		Muhammad Hidayattollah	314,979
Source: Regional Representative Council

==== East Kalimantan ====
#	Portrait	Name	Votes received
1		Aji Mirni Mawarni	188,193
2		Andi Sofyan Hasdam	179,346
3		Sinta Rosma Yenti	219,819
4		Yulianus Henock Samual	140,044
Source: Regional Representative Council

==== North Kalimantan ====
#	Portrait	Name	Votes received
1		Hasan Basri	51,725
2		Herman	55,198
3		Larasati Moriska	45,559
4		Marthin Billa	45,119
Source: Regional Representative Council

=== Sulawesi ===
==== North Sulawesi ====
#	Portrait	Name	Votes received
1		Adriana Charlotte Dondokambey	202,652
2		Cherish Harriette	234,333
3		Maya Rumantir	394,153
4		Stefanus B.A.N Liow	216,126
Source: Regional Representative Council

==== Gorontalo ====
#	Portrait	Name	Votes received
1		Fadel Muhammad	242,732
2		Jasin Usman Dilo	63,904
3		Rahmijati Jahja	85,146
4		Syarif Mbuinga	101,992
Source: Regional Representative Council

==== Central Sulawesi ====
#	Portrait	Name	Votes received
1		Abcandra Muhammad Akbar Supratman	181,655
2		Andhika Mayrizal Amir	130,859
3		Febriyanthi Hongkiriwang	183,470
4		Rafiq Al-Amri	162,585
Source: Regional Representative Council

==== South Sulawesi ====
#	Portrait	Name	Votes received
1		Al Hidayat Samsu	496,609
2		Andi Abd. Waris Halid	504,201
3		Andi Muhammad Ihsan	390,146
4		Tamsil Linrung	455,789
Source: Regional Representative Council

==== Southeast Sulawesi ====
#	Portrait	Name	Votes received
1		La Ode Umar Bonte	214,999
2		Leni Andriani Surunuddin	156,916
3		Mazaat Amirul Tamim	94,530
4		Wa Ode Rabia Al Adawia Ridwan	119,728
Source: Regional Representative Council

==== West Sulawesi ====
#	Portrait	Name	Votes received
1		Almalik Pababari	56,225
2		Andi Ian Masdar	55,090
3		Andri Prayoga Putra Singkarru	150,633
4		Jupri Mahmud	112,289
Source: Regional Representative Council

=== Maluku ===
==== Maluku ====
#	Portrait	Name	Votes received
1		Anna Ruswan Latuconsina	126,595
2		Bisri As Shiddiq Latuconsina	110,163
3		Nono Sampono (Note: Replaced Mirati Dewaningsih, who resigned 28 May 2024 to run for Central Maluku regent.)	84,660
4		Novita Anakotta	180,335
Source: Regional Representative Council

==== North Maluku ====
#	Portrait	Name	Votes received
1		Hasby Yusuf	73,980
2		Namto Roba	75,689
3		R. Graal Taliawo	103,783
4		Sultan Hidayat Mudaffar Sjah	95,030
Source: Regional Representative Council

=== Papua ===
==== Southwest Papua ====
#	Portrait	Name	Votes received
1		Agustinus R. Kambuaya	48,619
2		Hartono	35,014
3		Mamberob Rumakiek	52,542
4		Paul Finsen Mayor	63,416
Source: Regional Representative Council

==== West Papua ====
#	Portrait	Name	Votes received
1		Abdullah Manaray	39,583
2		Filep Wamafma	57,482
3		Lamek Dowansiba	57,973
4		Yance Samonsabra	31,178
Source: Regional Representative Council

==== Central Papua ====
#	Portrait	Name	Votes received
1		Eka Kristina Yeimo	146,004
2		Lis Tabuni	246,693
3		Yorrys Raweyai	179,828
4		Wilhelmus Pigai	139,260
Source: Regional Representative Council

==== South Papua ====
#	Portrait	Name	Votes received
1		Adib Fuad	44,527
2		Frits Tobo Wakasu	28,224
3		Rudy Tirtayana	30,711
4		Sularso	28,130
Source: Regional Representative Council

==== Highland Papua ====
#	Portrait	Name	Votes received
1		Arianto Kogoya	341,084
2		Matias Heluka	200,432
3		Nelson Wenda	219,751
4		Sopater Sam	171,205
Source: Regional Representative Council

==== Papua ====
#	Portrait	Name	Votes received
1		Carel Simon Petrus Suebu	115,036
2		David Harold Waromi	98,520
3		Henock Puraro (Note: Replaced Regina Muabuay, who died 17 June 2024.)	49,807
4		Lalita	52,087
Source: Regional Representative Council
