= List of deputy speakers of the Regional Representative Council of Indonesia =

Deputy Speakers of the Regional Representative Council

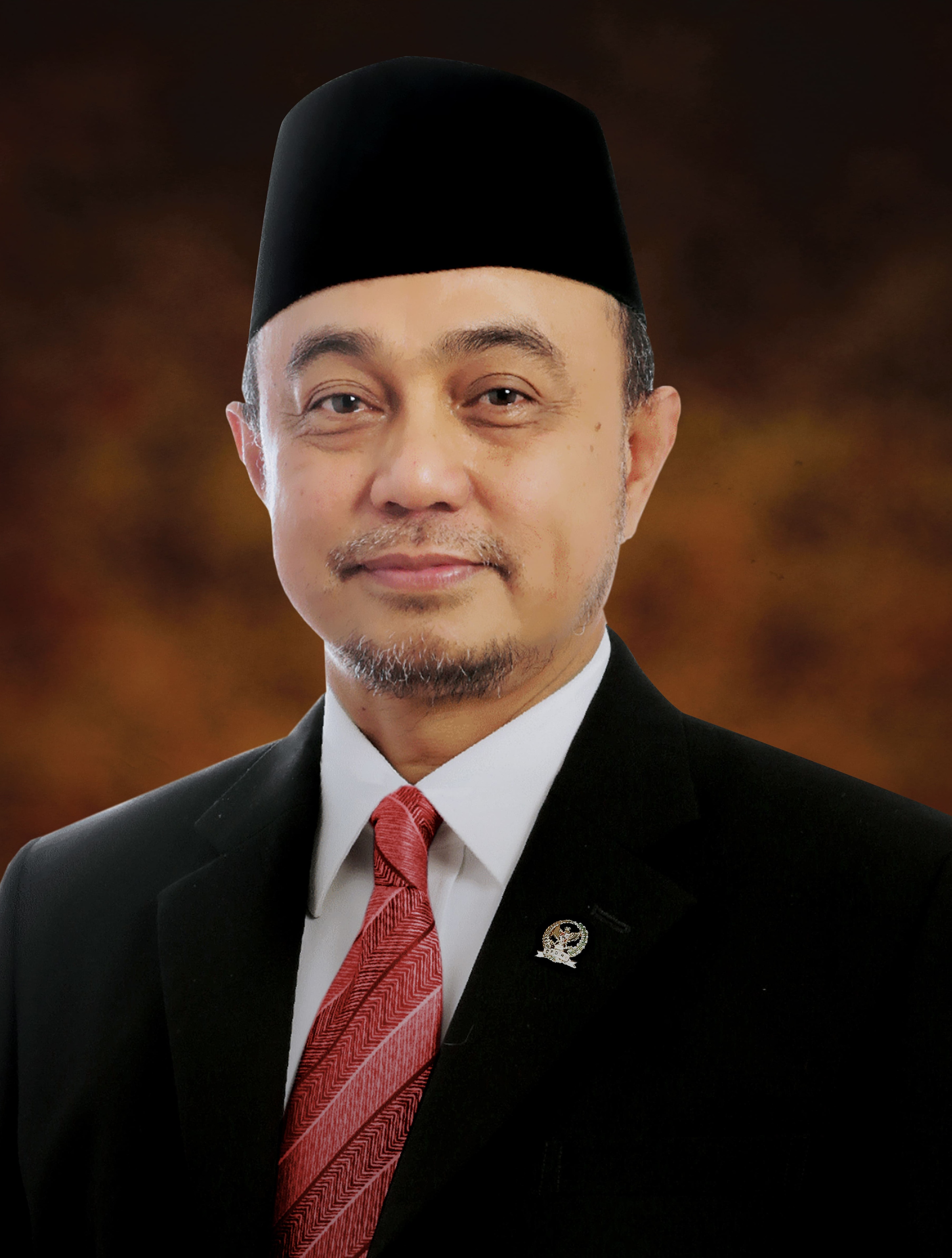
- Incumbent; GKR Hemas; Yorrys Raweyai; Tamsil Linrung since 2 October 2024
- Formation: 6 October 2004

This is a list of deputy speakers of the Regional Representative Council, the upper house of Indonesia. This list includes preceding bodies, such as the deputy speaker of the Senate of the United States of Indonesia.

== Preceding bodies ==
=== Deputy Speaker of the Senate of the United States of Indonesia ===
Term	Portrait	Name	Assumed office	Left office	Constituency	Notes	Speaker
1		Teuku Muhammad Hasan	27 February 1950	15 August 1950	Republic of Indonesia		M. A. Pellaupessy ( East Indonesia)

== Deputy speakers of the Regional Representative Council ==
Term	Portrait	Name	Assumed office	Left office	Constituency	Notes	Speaker
1		Irman Gusman	6 October 2004	1 October 2009	West Sumatra		Ginandjar Kartasasmita (West Java)
1		La Ode Ida	6 October 2004	1 October 2009	Southeast Sulawesi		Ginandjar Kartasasmita (West Java)
2		Gusti Kanjeng Ratu Hemas	2 October 2009	1 October 2014	Yogyakarta		Irman Gusman (West Sumatra)
2		La Ode Ida	2 October 2009	1 October 2014	Southeast Sulawesi		Irman Gusman (West Sumatra)
3		Gusti Kanjeng Ratu Hemas	2 October 2014	4 April 2017	Yogyakarta		Irman Gusman (West Sumatra) (2014-2016)
3		Farouk Muhammad	2 October 2014	4 April 2017	West Nusa Tenggara		Irman Gusman (West Sumatra) (2014-2016)
3	nirbing	Nono Sampono	4 April 2017	1 October 2019	Maluku		Mohammad Saleh (Bengkulu) (2016-2017)
3		Darmayanti Lubis	4 April 2017	1 October 2019	North Sumatra		Mohammad Saleh (Bengkulu) (2016-2017)
3		Akhmad Muqowam	26 July 2018	1 October 2019	Central Java		Oesman Sapta Odang (West Kalimantan) (2017-2019)
4		Nono Sampono	2 October 2019	Incumbent	Maluku		La Nyalla Mattalitti (East Java)
4		Mahyudin	2 October 2019	Incumbent	East Kalimantan		La Nyalla Mattalitti (East Java)
4		Sultan Bachtiar Najamudin	2 October 2019	Incumbent	Bengkulu		La Nyalla Mattalitti (East Java)

== See also ==
- Regional Representative Council
- List of speakers of the Regional Representative Council of Indonesia

== Bibliography ==
- Tim Penyusun Sejarah (1970), Seperempat Abad Dewan Perwakilan Rakyat Republik Indonesia [A Quarter Century of the People's Representative Council of the Republic of Indonesia] (PDF) (in Indonesian), Jakarta: Sekretariat DPR-GR
