= Politics of Indonesia =

Politics of Indonesia Politik Indonesia
- National emblem of Indonesia
- Polity type: Unitary presidential constitutional republic
- Constitution: Constitution of Indonesia

Legislative branch
- Name: People's Consultative Assembly
- Type: Bicameral
- Meeting place: Parliamentary Complex
- Presiding officer: Ahmad Muzani, Speaker
- Upper house
- Name: Regional Representative Council
- Presiding officer: Sultan Bachtiar Najamudin, Speaker
- Lower house
- Name: House of Representatives
- Presiding officer: Puan Maharani, Speaker

Executive branch
- Head of state and government
- Title: President of Indonesia
- Currently: Prabowo Subianto
- Appointer: Direct popular vote
- Cabinet
- Name: Cabinet of Indonesia
- Leader: President
- Deputy leader: Vice President
- Headquarters: Merdeka Palace

Judicial branch
- Name: Judiciary of Indonesia
- Supreme Court
- Chief judge: Sunarto
- Constitutional Court
- Chief judge: Suhartoyo

The politics of Indonesia take place in the framework of a presidential representative democratic republic whereby the President of Indonesia is both head of state and head of government and of a multi-party system. Executive power is exercised by the government. Legislative power is vested in both the government and the bicameral People's Consultative Assembly. The judiciary is independent of the executive and the legislature.

The 1945 constitution provided for a limited separation of executive, legislative and judicial power. The governmental system has been described as "presidential with parliamentary characteristics". Indonesia was democratic upon independence, but became authoritarian in 1957 under Sukarno. It remained authoritarian under his successor Suharto until the Indonesian riots of May 1998 and the resignation of President Suharto, which led to the restoration of democracy in Indonesia.

== Overview ==
The Economist Intelligence Unit rated Indonesia a "flawed democracy" in 2023. According to the V-Dem Democracy indices, in 2023, Indonesia was the 11th most electoral democratic country in Asia. Indonesia's political parties have been characterized as cartel parties with extensive power-sharing among parties and limited accountability to voters.

According to the American think tank Freedom House, Indonesia fails to meet many of the civil requirements for a consolidated, or maximalist, democracy. The court system often has many instances of corruption, and there is no due process in many civil and criminal matters.

== History ==
=== Old Order: Liberal Democracy and Guided Democracy ===
The "Old Order" (1950–1965) in Indonesia has long been understood to be a period of turmoil and crisis, characterized by rebellions and political unrest. The weakness of Indonesia's democracy and its gradual transition to authoritarianism during the Old Order can be attributed to conventional modernization theory, which suggests that without strong socioeconomic structures, successful transitions to democracy are unlikely. Indeed, it was not until the late 1960s when urbanization took place that the Indonesian government began to build a stronger democracy.

During the "Liberal Democracy" period (1950–1957), Indonesia aspired to renew its global status and achieve modernity as a newly independent country. In line with this vision, it sought to establish a democratic parliamentary system, bringing forth a "multi-party system, cabinet government under a prime minister, and a ceremonial president". However, the economic instability inherited from colonial rule significantly hindered their democratic nation-building vision: the Indonesian economy struggled to recover from the hardships of colonial occupation, with economic growth being stagnant and inflation reaching over 600% between the 1950s-1960s. Indonesia's economy heavily relied on the agricultural sector, but without diversification and industrialization, the government became vulnerable to polarization and instability.

Moreover, Indonesia's abundance of natural resources, such as coffee, rubber, and cocoa, made it susceptible to the political resource curse: Indonesia's resource wealth led to corruption, inequality, and political instability, hindering economic and social progress; the concentration of wealth and power in the hands of a few elites with a monopoly over these resources worsened the country's economic and political problems. This ultimately led to rising political tensions and the government's loss of control.

"Guided Democracy", which was in place from 1957 to 1966, aimed to bring about political stability, modernization, and development under the leadership of President Sukarno. Initially, Sukarno sought to build political institutions to bolster representation and resolve conflicts of regionalism, social class, and religion that plagued the Parliament during the Liberal Democracy era. However, power became increasingly centralized to the executive branch in the latter half of Guided Democracy, with Sukarno assuming a dictator-like role in the government. Indonesia's gradual transition to authoritarianism during the Guided Democracy period exemplifies the failure of the democratic project in the country due to weak socio-economic structures and the political resource curse that undermined its democratic development.

=== Transition to the New Order ===
The transition to the "New Order" in the mid-1960s, ousted Sukarno after 22 years in the position. One of the most tumultuous periods in the country's modern history, it was the commencement of Suharto's three-decade presidency. Described as the great dhalang ("puppet master"), Sukarno drew power from balancing the opposing and increasingly antagonistic forces of the army and the Communist Party of Indonesia (PKI).

By 1965, the PKI extensively penetrated all levels of government and gained influence at the expense of the army. On 30 September 1965, six of the military's most senior officers were killed in an action (generally labelled an "attempted coup") by the so-called 30 September Movement, a group from within the armed forces. Within a few hours, Major General Suharto mobilised forces under his command and took control of Jakarta. Anti-communists, initially following the army's lead, went on a violent purge of communists throughout the country, killing an estimated half million people and destroying the PKI, which was officially blamed for the crisis.

The politically weakened Sukarno was forced to transfer key political and military powers to General Suharto, who had become head of the armed forces. In March 1967, the Provisional People's Consultative Assembly (MPRS) named General Suharto acting president. He was formally appointed president one year later. Sukarno lived under virtual house arrest until his death in 1970. In contrast to the stormy nationalism, revolutionary rhetoric, and economic failure that characterised the early 1960s under the left-leaning Sukarno, Suharto's pro-Western "New Order" stabilised the economy but continued the official state philosophy of Pancasila.

=== New Order ===
Sukarno-Indonesia's first national figure and president-dissolved the elected assembly, introduced a concept known as Guided Democracy, and reinstated the 1945 constitution in 1959. The period of Guided Democracy was marked by the creation of a plethora of ministries, by the rise of the Indonesia Communist Party (Partai Komunis Indonesia; PKI) to a position of political dominance, and by the emergence of the army as a major anticommunist political force. The structure collapsed with an attempted coup d'état in 1965, which led to the downfall of Sukarno. Under Suharto, Sukarno's successor, Indonesia entered a new political era, officially called the New Order

The New Order (Indonesian: Orde Baru) is the term coined by President Suharto to characterise his regime as he came to power in 1966. He used this term to contrast his rule with that of his predecessor, Sukarno (dubbed the "Old Order," or Orde Lama). The term "New Order" in more recent times has become synonymous with the Suharto years (1966–1998).

Immediately following the attempted coup in 1965, the political situation was uncertain, but the New Order found much popular support from groups wanting a separation from Indonesia's problems since its independence. The 'generation of 66' (Angkatan 66) epitomised talk of a new group of young leaders and new intellectual thought. Following communal and political conflicts, and economic collapse and social breakdown of the late 1950s through to the mid-1960s, the New Order was committed to achieving and maintaining political order, economic development, and the removal of mass participation in the political process. The features of the New Order established from the late 1960s were thus a strong political role for the military, the bureaucratisation and corporatisation of political and societal organisations, and selective but effective repression of opponents. Strident anti-communism remained a hallmark of the regime for its subsequent 32 years.

Within a few years, however, many of its original allies had become indifferent or averse to the New Order, which comprised a military faction supported by a narrow civilian group. Among much of the pro-democracy movement which forced Suharto to resign in 1998 and then gained power, the term "New Order" has come to be used pejoratively. It is frequently employed to describe figures who were either tied to the New Order, or who upheld the practises of his authoritarian regime, such as corruption, collusion and nepotism (widely known by the acronym KKN: korupsi, kolusi, nepotisme).

=== Reform era ===
Map showing the parties/organisations with the largest vote share per province in Indonesia's elections from 1971 to 2019

The Post-Suharto era began with the fall of Suharto in 1998 during which Indonesia has been in a period of transition, an era known as Reformasi (English: Reform). This period has seen a more open and liberal political-social environment.

Indonesia's transition to democracy was a key part of the broader reform era. Democratic transitions tend to be grouped into two categories: bottom-up transitions where people rise up and overthrow an existing regime, and top-down transitions where an authoritarian ruler introduces liberalizing reforms leading to democratic transition. Indonesia experienced a transition toward democratic rule that involved both bottom-up and top-down forces after the fall of the authoritarian regime in 1998, thus altering the political structure of the country. Differences in democratization across developing countries, including Indonesia, is common and may be explained by different theoretical models. While Indonesia has been considered a democracy since the fall of the authoritarian regime in 1998, democratic consolidation has not completely been achieved.

A process of constitutional reform lasted from 1999 to 2002, with four amendments producing major changes. Among these were term limits of up to two five-year terms for the president and vice president and measures to institute checks and balances. The highest state institution is the People's Consultative Assembly (Indonesian: Majelis Permusyawaratan Rakyat, MPR), whose functions previously included electing the president and vice-president (since 2004 the president has been elected directly by the people), establishing broad guidelines of state policy, and amending the constitution. The 695-member MPR includes all 550 members of the House of Representatives (Indonesian: Dewan Perwakilan Rakyat, DPR) plus 130 members of Regional Representative Council (Indonesian: Dewan Perwakilan Daerah, DPD) elected by the 26 provincial parliaments and 65 appointed members from societal groups.

The DPR, which is the premier legislative institution, originally included 462 members elected through a mixed proportional/district representational system and thirty-eight appointed members of the Indonesian Armed Forces (TNI) and police (POLRI). TNI/POLRI representation in the DPR and MPR ended in 2004. Societal group representation in the MPR was eliminated in 2004 through further constitutional change. Having served as rubberstamp bodies in the past, the DPR and MPR have gained considerable power and are increasingly assertive in oversight of the executive branch. Under constitutional changes in 2004, the MPR became a bicameral legislature, with the creation of the DPD, in which each province is represented by four members, although its legislative powers are more limited than those of the DPR. Through his/her appointed cabinet, the president retains the authority to conduct the administration of the government.

A general election in June 1999 produced the first freely elected national, provincial and regional parliaments in over 40 years. In October 1999, the MPR elected a compromise candidate, Abdurrahman Wahid, as the country's fourth president, and Megawati Sukarnoputri—a daughter of Sukarno—as the vice-president. Megawati's PDI-P party had won the largest share of the vote (34%) in the general election, while Golkar, the dominant party during the New Order, came in second (22%). Several other, mostly Islamic parties won shares large enough to be seated in the DPR. Other nationwide democratic elections took place in 2004, 2009, 2014, and 2019.

The Indonesian political system before and after the constitutional amendments

In Indonesia, while free and fair elections have been held and a constitution guaranteeing certain rights and freedoms exists, corruption and involvement of money in politics persists. Corruption in regional government is often revenue-related, involving bribery and theft of public goods for personal gain, and identifies political corruption, such as fraudulent behavior and deviant lobbying techniques, as the type committed by government officials. Additionally, one of the primary reasons Indonesia may not be considered a consolidated democracy is due to their lack of “civilian control over the military”. Indonesia has created democratic institutions, but there is still progress that must be made to address the challenges the country currently faces in order to consolidate democracy.

After the Reformasi, Indonesia became a patronage democracy, where state resources are distributed among political parties. While patronage weakens democratic institutions and accountability, it serves as a powerful incentive for compromise and cooperation. Parties get into governing coalitions regardless of ideology to access state resources. This cut across identity-based cleavages. President Susilo Bambang Yudhoyono's leadership contained social conflict by mediating between conflicting forces and accommodating potential opposition. Yudhoyono's presidency was a period of democratic stagnation but also of peace, stability, and absence of political polarization. The 2014 Indonesian presidential election marked a rise of polarization, with an Islamist-pluralist divide, which continued in the 2017 Jakarta gubernatorial election and the 2019 Indonesian presidential election.

Currently, scholars are conflicted about the strength and durability of Indonesia's democracy. Indonesia scores well on certain characteristics of democracy, such as political rights, classifying it as a democracy in the minimalist interpretation of the word. However, the country lacks other aspects of democracy that are usually required for a regime to reach democratic consolidation, such as adequate civil rights protections.

A minimalist view of democracy classifies political regimes purely in terms of their institutions and procedures rather than the outcomes they produce. Specifically, a regime must implement free and fair elections. In Indonesia, the president is directly elected and can serve up to two five-year terms. There are limited voting irregularities, and international election monitors consider the elections free and fair. Additionally, in 2019, the Constitutional Court rejected claims of widespread voter fraud. The right to organize competing political parties is respected, and the system allows for the competition of several political parties. Thus, according to the minimalist definition, Indonesia is a democracy.

However, a maximalist approach to democracy claims that free and fair elections are insufficient to consider a regime a democracy. Maximalists argue that these countries must also guarantee other social, political, and economic rights, often those found in consolidated democracies. These include human rights protections, civil rights, egalitarianism, judicial independence, and more.

== Civil society in Indonesia ==
Civil society is a term that has been coined by both sides of the political spectrum for their respective interests. It is defined broadly by David Rieff as the wide range of organizations operating outside the governmental and business sectors. It has taken on ambiguous connotations as Robert Putnam has associated it with the strengthening of Democratic government while Sheri Berman has demonstrated how civil associations helped to collapse Weimar Germany. As with any other country, Indonesian civil society spans an array of organizations including professional, religious, intermediary, and mass-based. Under Suharto, civil society organizations (CSOs) often fought for democracy and human rights.

Under Suharto, civil society in Indonesia was massively contained. The mass murders of the left limited CSOs to advocacy relating to human rights and democracy. After his fall, civil society established itself in the reformed era. CSOs in Indonesia are reflective of the unique politics of the country. They exist on a spectrum of opinion on Islam's proper role in the government. For example, in 2017, the Indonesian government prohibited the Indonesian Chapter of Hizb ut-Tahrir. Using the Mass-Based Organizations (ORMAS) Act. Some CSOs condemned the action as a violation of human rights while others saw the move as a necessity in curbing extremist ideology. ORMAS represents new bureaucratic regulations and restrictions on CSOs. The passage of this law has been associated with the Indonesian government's continued crackdown on free speech and expression.

Humanprogress.org provides a Civil Society Participation Index which measures whether “major CSOs routinely consulted by policymakers; how large is the involvement of people in CSOs; are women prevented from participating;” among a variety of other factors. Indonesia's Civil Society Index has fluctuated throughout the 20th century. During the period of liberal democracy before Sukarno, Indonesia reached a Civil Society Participation score of 0.74. During the presidencies of Sukarno and Suharto, the score plunged to 0.12. As Indonesia entered its Reform Era, the score climbed to 0.95; however in recent years Indonesia's Civil Society Participation Index has declined to 0.82. Compared to its neighbors in Southeast Asia, Indonesia has been hailed as a champion for free expression in the region. Other tools to measure civil society are the CSO Sustainability Index Explorer by csosi.org and the Civil Society Index provided by the United Nations Development Programme.

== Executive branch ==
Main office-holders
Office	Name	Party	Since
President	Prabowo Subianto	Gerindra	20 October 2024
Vice President	Gibran Rakabuming Raka	Independent	20 October 2024

The executive branch of Indonesia is headed by a president, who is head of government and head of state. The president is elected by general election and can serve up to two five-year terms if re-elected. The executive branch also includes a vice-president and a cabinet. All bills need joint approval between the executive and the legislature to become law, meaning the president has veto power over all legislation. The president also has the power to issue presidential decrees that have policy effects, and is also in charge of Indonesia's foreign relations, although treaties require legislative approval. Prior to 2004, the president was selected by the MPR, but following the third amendment to the constitution, enacted in 2001, the president is now directly elected. The last election was held in February 2024, and Prabowo was elected and inaugurated on 20 October 2024.

== Legislative branch ==
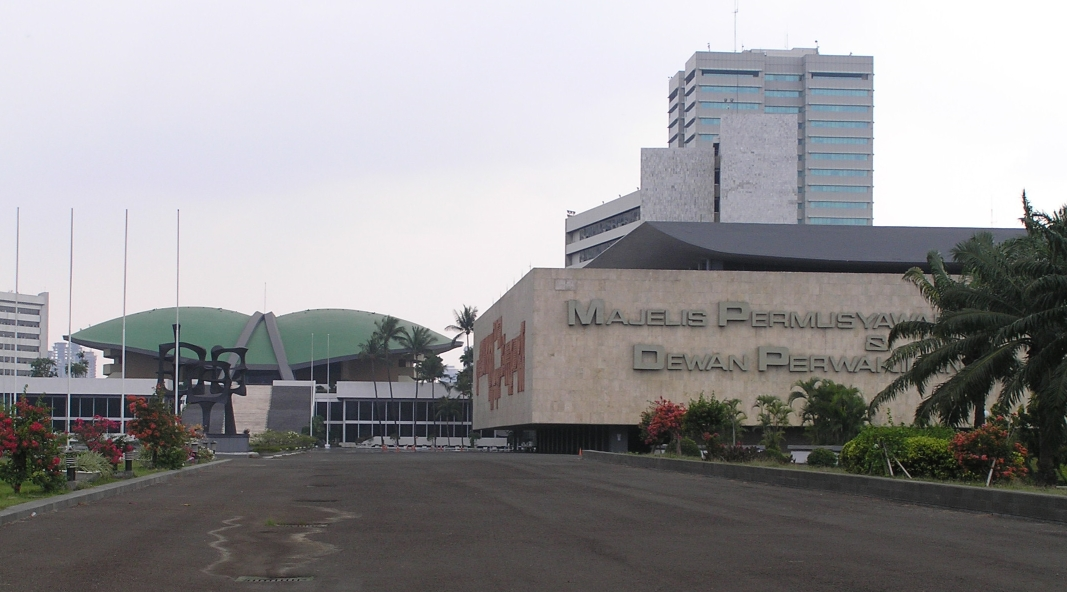
The legislative building complex.

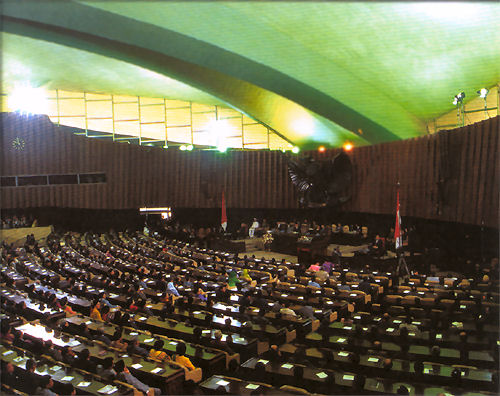
The House of Representatives.

The MPR is the Supreme legislative branch of Indonesia's political system. The MPR is composed of two houses: the DPR, which is commonly called the House of Representatives, and the DPD, which is called the Regional Representative Council. The 575 DPR members are elected through multi-member electoral districts, whereas 4 DPD senators are elected in each of Indonesia's 34 provinces. The DPR holds most of the legislative power because it has the sole power to pass laws. The DPD acts as a supplementary body to the DPR; it can propose bills, offer its opinion and participate in discussions, but it has no legal power. The MPR itself has power outside of those given to the individual houses. It can amend the constitution, inaugurate the president and conduct impeachment procedures. When the MPR acts in this function, it does so by simply combining the members of the two houses.

== Political parties and elections ==
The General Elections Commission (Indonesian: Komisi Pemilihan Umum, KPU) is the body that is responsible for running both parliamentary and presidential elections. Article 22E(5) of the Constitution rules that the KPU is national, permanent, and independent. Prior to the 2004 elections, the KPU was made up of members who were also members of political parties. However, members of KPU must now be non-partisan.

=== Latest election ===
==== President ====
Candidate	Running mate	Party	Votes	%
Prabowo Subianto	Gibran Rakabuming Raka (Ind.)	Gerindra Party	96,214,691	58.59
Anies Baswedan	Muhaimin Iskandar (PKB)	Independent	40,971,906	24.95
Ganjar Pranowo	Mahfud MD (Ind.)	Indonesian Democratic Party of Struggle	27,040,878	16.47
Total			164,227,475	100.00
Valid votes			164,227,475	97.51
Invalid/blank votes			4,194,536	2.49
Total votes			168,422,011	100.00
Registered voters/turnout			204,421,612	82.39
Source: KPU

=== House of Representatives ===
Party	Votes	%	+/–	Seats	+/–
Indonesian Democratic Party of Struggle	25,387,279	16.72	–2.61	110	–18
Golkar	23,208,654	15.29	+2.98	102	+17
Gerindra Party	20,071,708	13.22	+0.65	86	+8
National Awakening Party	16,115,655	10.62	+0.93	68	+10
NasDem Party	14,660,516	9.66	+0.61	69	+10
Prosperous Justice Party	12,781,353	8.42	+0.21	53	+3
Democratic Party	11,283,160	7.43	–0.34	44	–10
National Mandate Party	10,984,003	7.24	+0.40	48	+4
United Development Party	5,878,777	3.87	–0.65	0	–19
Indonesian Solidarity Party	4,260,169	2.81	+0.92	0	0
Perindo Party	1,955,154	1.29	–1.38	0	0
Gelora Party	1,281,991	0.84	New	0	New
People's Conscience Party	1,094,588	0.72	–0.82	0	0
Labour Party	972,910	0.64	New	0	New
Ummah Party	642,545	0.42	New	0	New
Crescent Star Party	484,486	0.32	–0.47	0	0
Garuda Party	406,883	0.27	–0.23	0	0
Nusantara Awakening Party	326,800	0.22	New	0	New
Total	151,796,631	100.00	–	580	+5
Source: KPU

=== Regional House of Representatives ===
Party	DPRD I (Provinces)		DPRD II (Regencies and cities)	
Party	Seats	Speakers	Seats	Speakers
Indonesian Democratic Party of Struggle	389	12	2810	153
Golkar	365	14	2521	122
Gerindra Party	323	4	2120	43
NasDem Party	265	3	1849	54
National Awakening Party	220	1	1833	39
Prosperous Justice Party	210	2	1312	21
Democratic Party	206	0	1479	18
National Mandate Party	160	1	1236	27
United Development Party	83	0	850	11
People's Conscience Party	42	0	486	4
Indonesian Solidarity Party	33	0	149	2
Perindo Party	31	0	349	4
Crescent Star Party	12	0	164	2
Nusantara Awakening Party	4	0	52	0
Garuda Party	3	0	34	0
Gelora Party	1	0	72	0
Ummah Party	0	0	20	0
Labour Party	0	0	11	0
Aceh Party	20	1	116	7
Aceh Just and Prosperous Party	3	0	16	0
Nanggroe Aceh Party	1	0	21	1
Aceh Abode Party	1	0	7	0
Independent Solidity of the Acehnese Party	0	0	3	0
Total	2372	38	17510	508

== Judicial branch ==
Both the Supreme Court of Indonesia (Mahkamah Agung) and the Constitutional Court (Mahkamah Konstitusi) are the highest level of the judicial branch. The Constitutional Court listens to disputes concerning legality of law, general elections, dissolution of political parties, and the scope of authority of state institution. It has 9 judges appointed by the DPR, the President and the Supreme Court. The Supreme Court of Indonesia hears final cessation appeals and conducts case reviews. It has 51 judges divided into 8 chambers. Its judges are nominated by the Judicial Commission of Indonesia and appointed by the President. Most civil disputes appear before the State Court (Pengadilan Negeri); appeals are heard before the High Court (Pengadilan Tinggi). Other courts include the Commercial Court, which handles bankruptcy and insolvency; the State Administrative Court (Pengadilan Tata Usaha Negara) to hear administrative law cases against the government; and the Religious Court (Pengadilan Agama) to deal with codified Islamic personal law (sharia) cases. Additionally, the Judicial Commission (Indonesian: Komisi Yudisial) monitors the performance of judges.

== Foreign relations ==
During the regime of president Suharto, Indonesia built strong relations with the United States and had difficult relations with the People's Republic of China owing to Indonesia's anti-communist policies and domestic tensions with the Chinese community. It received international denunciation for its annexation of East Timor and the related genocide against the East Timorese in 1978. Indonesia is a founding member of the Association of South East Asian Nations, and thereby a member of both ASEAN+3 and the East Asia Summit.

Since the 1980s, Indonesia has worked to develop close political and economic ties between Southeast Asian countries, and is also influential in the Organisation of Islamic Cooperation. Indonesia was heavily criticised between 1975 and 1999 for allegedly suppressing human rights in East Timor, and for supporting violence against the East Timorese following the latter's secession and independence in 1999. Since 2001, the government of Indonesia has co-operated with the US in cracking down on Islamic fundamentalism and terrorist groups.

== See also ==
- Constitution of Indonesia
- Administrative divisions of Indonesia
- List of presidents of Indonesia
- List of vice presidents of Indonesia
- Foreign relations of Indonesia
- Censorship in Indonesia
- Corruption in Indonesia
