= Fadel Muhammad =

Indonesian politician

Fadel Muhammad Al-Haddar
- فاضل محمد الهدار

Deputy Speaker of People's Consultative Assembly
- In office 3 October 2019 – 1 October 2024 Serving with List: Ahmad Basarah; Ahmad Muzani; Lestari Moerdijat; Hidayat Nur Wahid; Jazilul Fawaid; Zulkifli Hasan; Syarief Hasan; Arsul Sani
- Speaker: Bambang Soesatyo
- Preceded by: Oesman Sapta Odang
- Succeeded by: Abcandra Muhammad Akbar Supratman
- Parliamentary group: Regional Representative Council

Senator for Gorontalo
- Incumbent
- Assumed office 1 October 2019 Serving with List: Abdurrahman Abubakar Bahmid (2019–24); Dewi Sartika Hemeto (2019–24); Rahmijati Jahja (2019–); Syarif Mbuinga (2024–); Jasin U. Dilo (2024–)
- Speaker: La Nyalla Mattalitti; Sultan Bachtiar Najamudin
- Preceded by: Hana Hasanah Shahab
- Constituency: Gorontalo
- Majority: 166,043 (2019); 242.732 (2024)

Member of House of Representatives
- In office 1 October 2014 – 1 October 2019
- Speaker: Setya Novanto; Ade Komarudin; Bambang Soesatyo
- Parliamentary group: Golkar
- Constituency: Gorontalo
- Majority: 163,054

5th Minister of Maritime and Fisheries of Indonesia
- In office 22 October 2009 – 19 October 2011
- President: Susilo Bambang Yudhoyono
- Preceded by: Freddy Numberi
- Succeeded by: Sharif Cicip Sutardjo

1st Governor of Gorontalo
- In office 12 September 2001 – 21 October 2009
- President: Megawati Soekarnoputri; Susilo Bambang Yudhoyono
- Preceded by: Tursandy Alwi (acting)
- Succeeded by: Gusnar Ismail

Personal details
- Born: Fadel Muhammad; 20 May 1952 (age 74) Ternate, North Maluku, Indonesia
- Party: Independent (2019–present)
- Other political affiliations: Golkar (1989–2019)
- Spouses: Astrid Fadel Muhammad (divorced); Hana Hasanah Shahab
- Children: 6
- Parents: Salamah binti Salim (mother); Muhammad bin Muchsin Al Hadar (father)
- Education: Bandung Institute of Technology (1973–1978); Gadjah Mada University (2006–2007)
- Occupation: Politician; businessman; intellectual
- Awards: Satyalancana Pembangunan
- Organization: Alkhairaat

Fadel Muhammad Alhaddar (Arabic: فاضل محمد الهدار, romanized: Fāḍel Muḥammad al-Haddār) is a senator for the Regional Representative Council and was appointed governor of the then-newest Indonesian province, Gorontalo, from 2001–2006. In 2006, he won the first Gorontalo gubernatorial election, making him governor until 2011. From 22 October 2009 – 19 October 2011, he was the Minister of Maritime Affairs and Fisheries in President Susilo Bambang Yudhoyono's cabinet.

== Early life and education ==
During his study at the department of engineering physics, Bandung Institute of Technology (ITB), he was actively involved in various student bodies and was honored with an Outstanding Student award in 1975.

== Business career ==
After obtaining his degree in 1978, he entered the business world and together with a few fellow graduates set up a pioneering engineering company, PT Bukaka Teknik Utama, Tbk.. The company, which first manufactured fire trucks and construction equipment, has expanded and diversified to become a leader in the Indonesian engineering and manufacturing industry. And today, the company, which became a publicly listed company in 1994, is concentrating on infrastructure sectors, especially in the field of energy, transportation, and telecommunication.

After having completely resigned his presidency from Bukaka Group in 1997, he became the owner of GEMA Group holding some joint venture companies such as PT Bayer Urethanes Indonesia (polyol manufacturer), PT Gema SemCorp Engineering (steel fabricator), PT Dowell Anadrill Schlumberger (cementing services and rental equipment for drilling on oil and gas), plus the publishing companies Warta Ekonomi and Mobil Motor. He was also President Commissioner of INTAN Group (Insurances).

He has attended various seminars and conferences on management, finance, economics, engineering, in Indonesia and overseas. He was also a vice president of the Indonesian Chamber of Commerce and Industry (KADIN).

== Political career ==
Since 1992, he has been appointed a member of MPR-RI (People's Consultative Assembly of the Republic of Indonesia), and he was also elected as the Chief Treasurer of Golkar Party.

On December 10, 2001, he was appointed the governor of Gorontalo Province for the period 2001–2006, and in 2006 he won the Gorontalo gubernatorial election, making him governor until 2011. After his inauguration as Minister of Maritime Affairs and Fisheries by President Susilo Bambang Yudhoyono on October 22, 2009, he appointed Deputy Governor Gusnar Ismail to replace him as Governor of Gorontalo until 2011.

In 2007 he accomplished his doctorate in public administration, magna cum laude, from University of Gadjah Mada, Yogyakarta. From 2009 to 2011, he was appointed Minister of Maritime and Fisheries Affairs.

== Personal life ==
Fadel Muhammad Alhaddar was born in Ternate, North Maluku on 20 May 1952 of Arab-Indonesian descent. He was married to Hana Hasanah, a former senator from Gorontalo (member of the Regional Representative Council) from 2009 to 2014 and 2014–2019. From his marriage to Hana, he has a daughter named Nayla Salsabila Fadel. Fadel has four other children from a marriage to his former wife Astrid Fadel Muhammad, namely Fikri Fadel Muhammad, Faiz Fadel Muhammad, Jehan Nabila Fadel, and Fauzan Fadel Muhammad.

Political offices
| Preceded by Freddy Numberi | Minister of Maritime Affairs and Fisheries; 2009–2011 | Succeeded by Sharif Cicip Sutardjo |
| Preceded by Tursandy Alwi (acting) | Governor of Gorontalo; 2001–2009 | Succeeded by Gusnar Ismail (acting) |
