= 2012 Special Honours =

British government recognitions

The Special Honours are issued at the Queen's pleasure at any given time.

== Most Honourable Order of the Bath ==
=== Knight Grand Cross of the Order of the Bath (GCB) ===
Honorary

- His Highness Sheikh Sabah Al-Ahmad Al-Jaber Al-Sabah. The Amir of the State of Kuwait.
- His Excellency Dr Susilo Bambang Yudhoyono, President of the Republic of Indonesia.

== Order of Merit (OM) ==
- The Honourable John Winston Howard, A.C.
- David Hockney C.H.

== Most Distinguished Order of St Michael and St George ==
=== Knight Commander of the Order of St Michael and St George (KCMG) ===
Honorary

- His Excellency Marzuki Ali. Speaker of the House of Representatives of Indonesia.
- His Excellency Irman Gusman. Speaker of the House of Regional Representatives of Indonesia.
- Efthimios Elias Mitropoulos. For services to international maritime safety, security and protection of the marine

environment.

- His Excellency Dr R M Marty M Natalegawa. Minister of Foreign Affairs of Indonesia.
- His Excellency Sudi Silalahi. Minister of the State Secretariat of Indonesia.

=== Companion of the Order of St Michael and St George (CMG) ===
Honorary

- His Excellency Sheikh Ahmad Humoud Al-Jaber Al-Sabah. Interior Minister and First Deputy Prime Minister of Kuwait.
- His Excellency Sheikh Sabah Al-Khalid Al-Sabah. Foreign Minister and Deputy Prime Minister of Kuwait.
- His Excellency Dr Nayef Falah Al-Hajraf. Minister of Education and Minister of Finance of Kuwait.
- His Excellency Anas Khalid Al-Saleh. Minister of Commerce and Industry and Minister of State for Housing Affairs of Kuwait.
- His Excellency Khaled Sulaiman Al-Jarallah. Undersecretary, Ministry of Foreign Affairs of Kuwait.
- His Excellency Sheikh Ali Jarrah Al-Sabah. Deputy Minister of The Amiri Diwan Affairs.
- His Excellency Ahmed Fahad Al-Fahad. Director of the Amir of Kuwait's Office.
- Sheikh Khaled Al-Abdullah Al-Sabah. Chief of Amiri Protocol and Chamberlain.
- His Excellency Ambassador Mohammed Abdulla Abo-Al-Hassan. Foreign Policy Adviser to the Amir of Kuwait.

== Royal Victorian Order ==
=== Knight Commander of the Order of the Royal Victorian Order (KCVO) ===
Honorary

- His Excellency T M Hamzah Thayeb. Indonesian Ambassador to the UK.

=== Commander of the Order of the Royal Victorian Order (CVO) ===
Honorary

- Henry R W Kaitjily. Deputy Director, Directorate General of Protocol and Consular, Indonesian Government.
- Harry R J Kandou. Deputy Chief of Mission, Indonesian Embassy.
- Kustanto Widiatmoko. Private Secretary to the President of Indonesia.

=== Lieutenant of the Order of the Royal Victorian Order (LVO) ===
Honorary

- Yousef Hamad Al-Roumi. Undersecretary for Information and Cultural Affairs, Amiri Diwan.
- His Excellency Sheikh Fawaz Saud Al-Sabah. Under-Secretary for Economic and Political Affairs, Amiri Diwan.
- Harris Nugroho. Minister Counsellor (Political Affairs), Indonesian Embassy.

=== Member of the Order of the Royal Victorian Order (MVO) ===
Honorary

- Mohammed AL-Arjan. Second Secretary, Kuwait Embassy.
- Mona N. Behbehani. Third Secretary, Kuwait Embassy.
- Heni Hamidah. Media, Indonesian Embassy.
- Billy Wibisono. Second Secretary (Information & Socio-Cultural Affairs), Indonesian Embassy.

== Most Excellent Order of the British Empire ==
=== Dame Commander of the Order of the British Empire (DBE) ===
Honorary

- Professor Uta Frith. For services to clinical science.

=== Knight Commander of the Order of the British Empire (KBE) ===
Honorary

- Bernard Jean Etienne Arnault. For services to business and the wider community in the UK.
- Mr Kotaro Ono. For services to British charities and institutions.
- Mark Charles Pigott. For services to the arts, education, employment and philanthropy
- Timothy Bartel Smit KBE – Honorary appointment in 2011 to be made Substantive.

=== Commander of the Order of the British Empire (CBE) ===
Honorary

- Jiří Bělohlávek. For services to music
- Robert Lee Boyett. For services to drama
- Bob Collins. For public service
- Philippe Vincent Jacques Léon Marie De Rivaz. For services to the electricity and gas industries.
- Suzan Sabanci Dinçer. For services to UK/Turkey relations and bilateral business interests.
- Dr William Hall Janeway. For services to education in support of Cambridge University and to UK/US relations.
- Mr Michael Kahn. For services to UK/US cultural relations.
- Dr William Martin Kelso. For services to archaeology.
- Sanford Lieberson. For services to the film industry.

=== Officer of the Order of the British Empire (OBE) ===
Honorary
Military division

- Colonel Tolhas Sininta Nauli Basana Hutabarat. ADC to the President of Indonesia.
- Colonel Jonni Mahroza. Defence Attaché, Indonesian Embassy.

Civil division

- Whalid Al-Khabazi. Director General Europe, Ministry of Foreign Affairs of Kuwait.
- Sean Francis Brennan. For services to local government.
- Henry Arthur Crosbie. For services to British/Irish cultural relations.
- Professor Marianne Hester. For services to the prevention of domestic violence.
- Professor François Kersaudy. For services to contemporary history and UK/France cultural relations
- Eddie Jordan. For services to charity and motor racing.
- Sara Theresa Celine McKenna. For services to education in Northern Ireland.
- Oliver Peyton. For services to the hospitality industry.
- Murdaya Widyawimarta Po. For services to British interests in Indonesia.
- Susanne Brigitte Rauprich. For services to industry.
- Katsuhiko Waza. For services to British business and culture in Japan.

=== Member of the Order of the British Empire (MBE) ===
Honorary
Military division

- 1st Lieutenant Okti Cahyandari. ADC to the First Lady of Indonesia.

Civil division

- Majdi Mohammed Fawzi Al Massaied.For services to the British Embassy, Muscat.
- Erik Mugerdich Baloyán. For services to UK-Mexico relations.
- Raja Bel Ghazi. For services to the British Embassy in Rabat.
- David Eugene Crean. For services to the community in Luton, Bedfordshire.
- F Michael Distasio. For services to British education in South Korea.
- Ahmed Mostafa Elhawary. For services to the British community and British Embassy in Cairo.
- Rolf Hestness. For services to British interests in Norway.
- Masayo Kidani. For charitable services in the UK.
- Masao Kumori. For services to foreign investment in North East England.
- Julie Marie Meyer. For services to entrepreneurship.
- Catherine Ann Pollak Moss. For services to young people.
- Mbacke Niang. For services to Oxfam.
- Camellia Panjabi. For services to the hospitality industry.
- Tameshwarlal Ramdat. For services to British interests.
