= Ginandjar Kartasasmita =

Indonesian politician (born 1941)

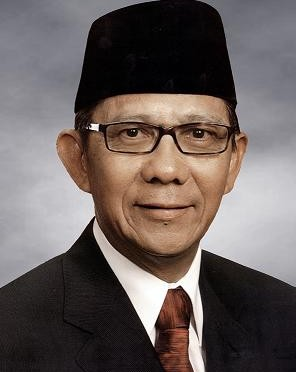

1st Speaker of the Regional Representative Council
- In office 1 October 2004 – 1 October 2009
- President: Megawati Sukarnoputri; Susilo Bambang Yudhoyono
- Preceded by: Office created
- Succeeded by: Irman Gusman

6th Minister of National Development Planning of Indonesia
- In office 14 March 1998 – 21 May 1998
- President: Suharto
- Preceded by: Saleh Afif
- In office 23 May 1998 – 27 September 1999
- President: B. J. Habibie
- Succeeded by: Kwik Kian Gie

Member of Indonesia's Presidential Advisory Board
- In office 25 January 2010 – 20 October 2014
- President: Susilo Bambang Yudhoyono
- Chairman of the Board: Emil Salim

5th Coordinating Minister for Economic Affairs
- In office 17 March 1993 – 21 May 1998
- President: Suharto
- Preceded by: Saleh Afif
- Succeeded by: Boediono

8th Minister of Energy and Mineral Resources
- In office 21 March 1988 – 17 March 1993
- President: Suharto
- Preceded by: Soebroto
- Succeeded by: Ida Bagus Sujana

Personal details
- Born: 9 April 1941 (age 85) Bandoeng, Dutch East Indies
- Party: Independent
- Spouse: Yultin Harlotina
- Children: Gita Kartasasmita; Agus Gumiwang Kartasasmita; Galih Dimuntur Kartasasmita; Gaya Ratna Mustika Arum Kartasasmita
- Education: Bandung Institute of Technology; Tokyo University of Agriculture and Technology; College of Administrative Sciences Institute of Public Administration; Officer Elementary School; Air Force Command and Staff College
- Occupation: Soldier; Politician

Military service
- Allegiance: Indonesia
- Branch/service: Indonesian Air Force
- Years of service: 1967–1994
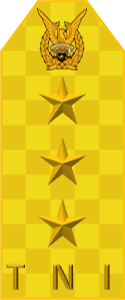
- Rank: Air Marshal
- Unit: Technical corps

Ginandjar Kartasasmita (born 9 April 1941 in Bandung, West Java) is an Indonesian politician. He served a five-year term (2004–2009) as Speaker of Indonesia Regional Representative Council (DPD-RI).

== Background ==
Ginandjar attended Kanisius College in Jakarta. His frequent association with students of other nationalities and religious backgrounds fueled his nationalism. After one year of studying at the Bandung Institute of Technology (ITB) in West Java, he was awarded a scholarship to Tokyo University of Agriculture and Technology, where he studied chemical engineering (industrial chemistry) from 1960 to 1965.

Upon returning to Indonesia on 15 October 1965 in the aftermath of a failed military coup, Ginandjar worked for the military's Supreme Operations Command (KOTI) for one year. In 1967, he served as General Director of Research and Development at the Indonesian Air Force, and from 1968–1971 he was head of the Analysis and Legislation Research Bureau at the Cabinet Secretariat. He is a visiting professor at Waseda University.

== Political career ==
Ginandjar has been active in politics since the 1970s when he sat in Suharto's cabinet. He has always called himself a nationalist, due to the influence of his parents who were both National Party of Indonesia (PNI) activists before World War II.

Ginandjar served as Minister of Mining, and Energy and State Minister of PPN/Head of the Indonesian National Development Planning Agency Bappenas.

He has been attacked as a part of the New Order, but argued that his membership in the cabinet was professional. Ginandjar commented, "I'm a part of the system, but I'm a professional in the cabinet".

Ginandjar played a role in encouraging Suharto to resign in May 1998 when he and other ministers refused to sit in the Development Reform Cabinet to be formed by president Suharto. When it became clear to Suharto that it would be hard for him to form a cabinet, he chose to stand down in favor of his vice president B. J. Habibie.

In October 2004, Ginandjar was elected the first speaker of the newly formed DPD. He won 72 of 128 votes in a run-off against Irman Gusman, who together with La Ode Ida became his deputies. He completed his five-year term on 1 October 2009 and was succeeded by Irman Gusman.

== Corruption arrest ==
In late March 2001, state prosecutors issued an arrest warrant for Ginandjar for alleged corruption that caused state losses of $24.8 million. His arrest was delayed because he was hospitalized for tests on his stomach. He was arrested on 6 April 2001 at a Jakarta hospital and held at the detention center at the Attorney General's Office compound. He denied any wrongdoing and said his arrest was politically motivated and ordered by then-president Abdurrahman Wahid. Ginandjar challenged the arrest warrant and tried to sue the Attorney General's Office for wrongful arrest.

He was a suspect in a case involving PT Ustraindo Petro Gas, a company owned by Suharto's middle son Bambang Trihatmodjo and state oil and gas firm Pertamina. Ginandjar was the mines and energy minister when Pertamina paid for Ustraindo’s costs in developing four oil fields, whereas Ustraindo was contractually required to cover the costs. The arrangement caused the state losses of $18 million. State prosecutors said the terms of the government-company production sharing contract were altered to Ustraindo's benefit, inflicting additional state losses.

Ginandjar was released after a month. He acknowledged it was difficult to shake off corruption allegations because he was part of the Suharto regime. "Saying that I'm not corrupt is a bit like the saying: 'I'm not beating my wife.' No one ever believes you", he said in 2001.

== Honours ==
=== National ===
- Indonesia
  - Star of the Republic of Indonesia (3rd Class) (Indonesian: Bintang Republik Indonesia Utama) (1998)
  - Star of Mahaputera (2nd Class) (Indonesian: Bintang Mahaputera Adipradana) (1987)
  - Star of Service (2nd Class) (Indonesian: Bintang Jasa Pratama) (1982)

=== Foreign honours ===
- Austria :
  - Grand Decoration of Honour in Gold of the Decoration of Honour for Services to the Republic of Austria (1986)
- Egypt :
  - Commander of the Order of the Republic (1978)
- France :
  - Commander of the National Order of Merit (1987)
- Japan :
  - Grand Cordon of the Order of the Rising Sun (2008)
- Kuwait :
  - Order of Kuwait 4th Class (1978)
- South Korea :
  - Gwanghwa Medal of the Order of Diplomatic Service Merit (1988)
- Venezuela :
  - Grand Cordon of the Order of the Liberator (1988)

== Bibliography ==
- Pembangunan untuk Rakyat (Development for the People, 1996
- Administrasi Pembangunan: Perkembangan Pemikiran dan Praktiknya di Indonesia
- Developmental Administration:Development of Its Thought and Practice in Indonesia, 1997)

| Preceded by office created | Speaker of Indonesia Regional Representative Council; 2004-2009 | Succeeded by Irman Gusman |
