= List of temporary speakers and deputy speakers of the Regional Representative Council =

Temporary Speaker and Deputy Speaker of Regional Representative Council
- Ketua dan Wakil Ketua Sementara Dewan Perwakilan Daerah

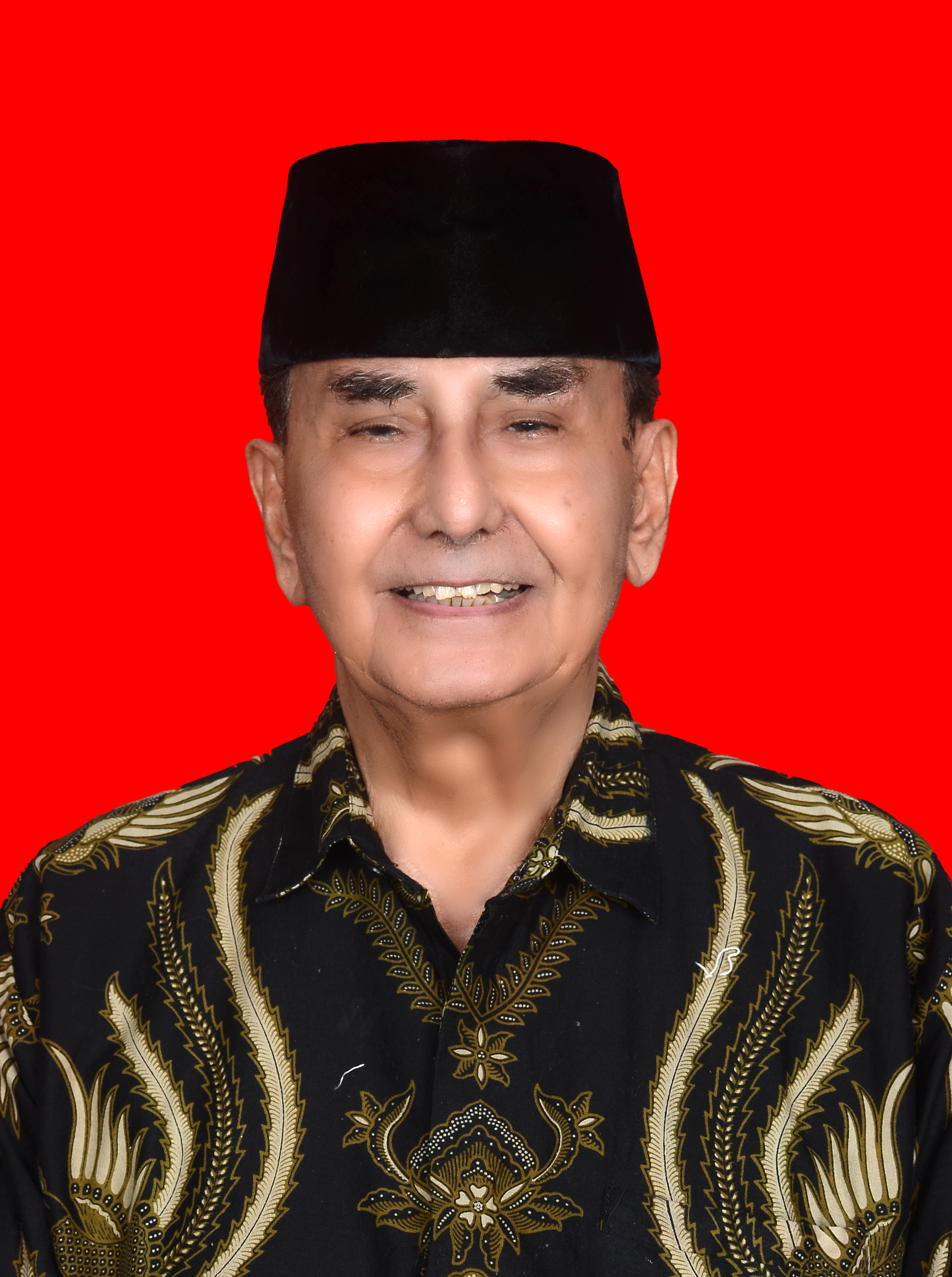
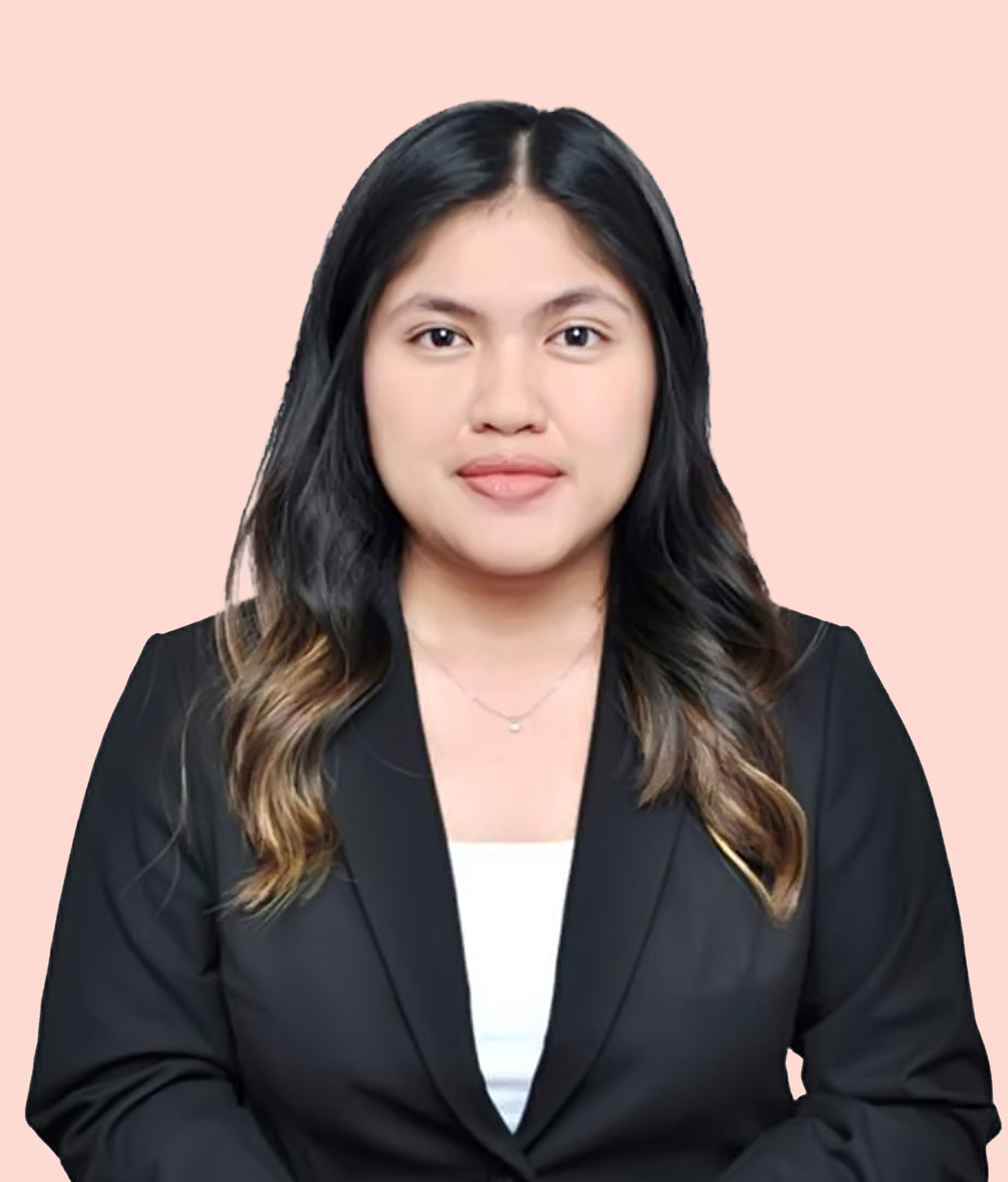
- Most recent officeholder Ismeth Abdullah (Temporary Speaker); Larasati Moriska (Temporary Deputy Speaker); 1 October 2024
- Member of: Regional Representative Council
- Inaugural holder: Mooryati Soedibyo; Muhammad Nasir
- Formation: 1 October 2004; 22 years ago

This article lists temporary speakers and deputy speakers who lead the meeting of the Regional Representative Council of the term before the definitive speaker and deputy speaker for the term is elected.

According to the tradition, since 1950, the position of temporary speakers is held by the youngest and oldest member of the council.

This article also includes the temporary speakers from the Senate of the United States of Indonesia.

Term	Meetings	Temporary Speaker Oldest				Temporary Deputy Speaker Youngest				Notes
Term	Meetings	Photo	Name	Age	Constituency	Photo	Name	Age	Constituency	Notes
Senate
1	17-27 February 1950		Sujadi	62 years, 1 month	East Java	none				
Regional Representative Council
1	1 October 2004		Mooryati Soedibyo	76 years, 8 months	Jakarta		Muhammad Nasir	28 years, 1 month	Jambi	
2	1 October 2009		Mudaffar Sjah	74 years, 5 months	North Maluku		Percha Leanpuri	23 years, 3 months	South Sumatra	
3	1 October 2014		Mudaffar Sjah	79 years, 5 months	North Maluku		Riri Damayanti	24 years, 7 months	Bengkulu	
4	1 October 2019		Sabam Sirait	82 years, 11 months	Jakarta		Jialyka Maharani	22 years	South Sumatra	
5	1 October 2024		Ismeth Abdullah	78 years	Riau Islands		Larasati Moriska	22 years, 9 months	North Kalimantan	

== Bibliography ==
- Tim Penyusun Sejarah (1970), Seperempat Abad Dewan Perwakilan Rakyat Republik Indonesia [A Quarter Century of the Regional Representative Council of the Republic of Indonesia] (PDF) (in Indonesian), Jakarta: Sekretariat DPR-GR
