= Hana Hasanah Shahab =

Indonesian politician

Hana Hasanah Fadel Muhammad
- هناء حسنة شهاب
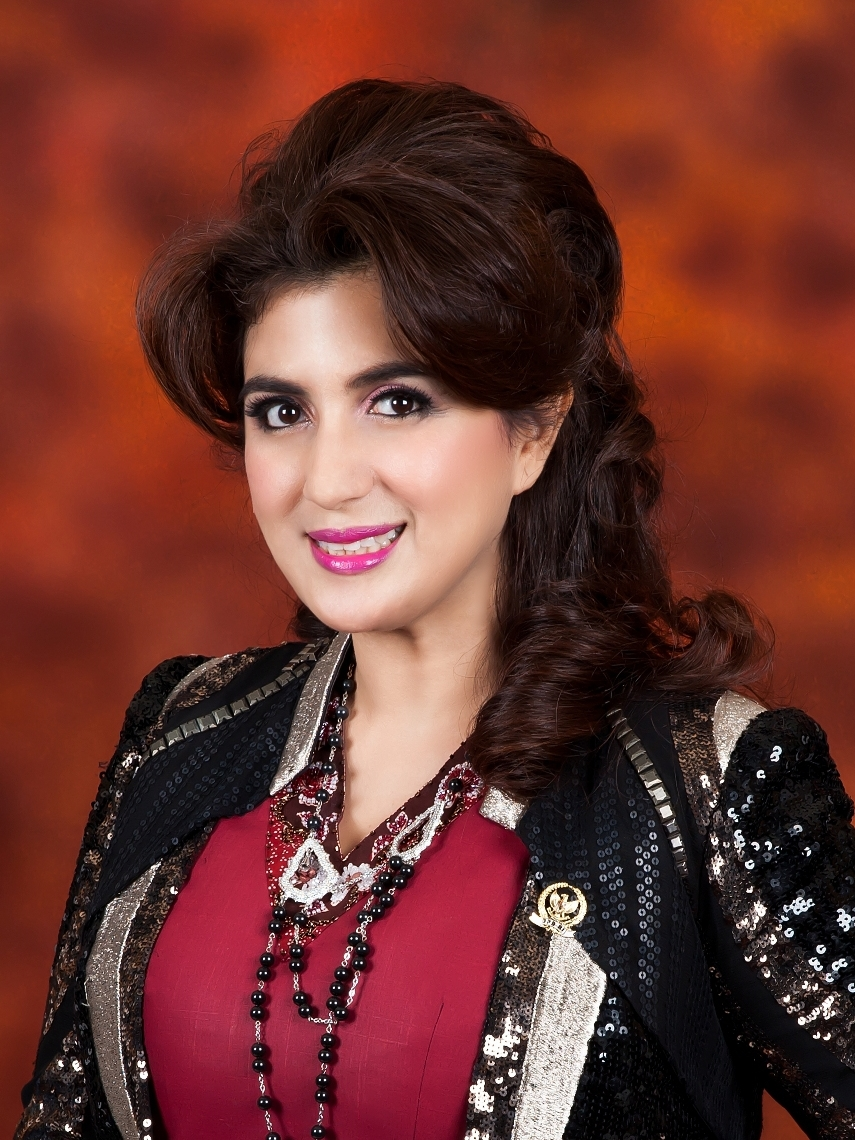
- Portrait of Hana in 2014 as member of Regional Representative Council (Senator of RI)

Senator of the Republic of Indonesia from Gorontalo
- In office October 1, 2009 – October 27, 2016 Serving with List: Rahmiyati Jahja (2009–2019); Elnino Mohi (2009–2014); Budi Doku (2009–2014); Abdurrahman Abubakar Bahmid (2014–2019); Dewi Sartika Hemeto (2014–2019)
- Preceded by: 2004–2009 period: Nani Tuloli; Amir Adam; Roeland Niode; A.D. Khaly
- Succeeded by: A.D. Khaly
- Majority: 158,904 (2009); 185,079 (2014)

Personal details
- Education: SMA Negeri 34 Jakarta (1985–1988); Institute of Social and Political Science Jakarta (1989)
- Occupation: Politician; socialite; senator; businessperson

Indonesian Democratic Party of Struggle candidate for Governor of Gorontalo
- Election date February 15, 2017
- Running mate: Tonny S. Junus
- Opponent(s): Rusli Habibie (Golkar); Zainuddin Hasan (PAN)
- Incumbent: Rusli Habibie

Personal details
- Born: Hana Hasanah Shahab; September 1, 1969 (age 56) Jakarta, Indonesia
- Party: United Development Party (2018–present)
- Other political affiliations: Indonesian Democratic Party of Struggle (until 2018)
- Spouses: Salim Reza Alatas (divorced); Fadel Muhammad
- Hana Hasanah Shahab on Instagram

Hana Hasanah Shahab (Arabic: هناء حسنة شهاب, romanized: Hanā’ Ḥasanah Šahāb, Arabic pronunciation: [hanaːʔ ħasanah ʃahaːb], or also known as Hana Hasanah Fadel Muhammad after marrying the politician Fadel Muhammad; born September 1, 1969) is an Indonesian politician and socialite who had served as an Indonesian senator from Gorontalo (member of the Regional Representative Council of the Republic of Indonesia) from 2009 to 2014. In the 2014 Indonesian legislative election, she was re-elected as senator from Gorontalo for the 2014–2019 period. However, in 2016 she resigned from her position to run for Gorontalo governor candidate from Indonesian Democratic Party of Struggle (PDI-P) in the 2017 Gorontalo gubernatorial election.

After losing the Gorontalo gubernatorial election in 2017, in 2018, he left the PDI-P and register as a member of the United Development Party (PPP) to move forward as a candidate for the member of the People's Representative Council of the Republic of Indonesia in the 2019 Indonesian general election. However, by only getting 54,901 votes, Hana failed to advance as a member of the Indonesian Parliament representing PPP in the Gorontalo electoral district.

== Early life and education ==
Hana Hasanah Shahab was born in Jakarta to an Arab Betawi married couple from the Ba 'Alawi sada clan named Thahir Shahabuddin and Aisyah Syarif Shahab.

Hana began her education at the elementary school level in one of Muhammadiyah Elementary Schools in Jakarta in 1976–1982. Then in 1982, she continued her studies at SMP Negeri 12 Jakarta in Kebayoran Baru, South Jakarta, and graduated in 1985. At the high school level, she graduated in 1989 from SMA Negeri 34 Jakarta. Then in 1989, she continued her education at the Institute of Social and Political Science Jakarta majoring in public relations. In addition, she also studied at STIMA IMMI Jakarta in management.

== Personal life ==
Hana is the wife of former Golkar party politician Fadel Muhammad. From her marriage to Fadel, she has a daughter named Nayla Salsabila Fadel. In addition, before marrying Fadel, Hana was the wife of Salim Reza Alatas. From her marriage to Salim, she has a daughter named Fatimah Tania Nadira. From Tania's marriage to her first husband, Tommy Kurniawan, Hana has two grandchildren named Muhammad Al Fatih Fabrizio and Naira Syabila Azzahra Kurniawan.

Hana has four stepchildren from Fadel Muhammad's marriage to his first wife, Astrid. They are Fikri Fadel Muhammad, Faiz Fadel Muhammad, Jehan Nabila Fadel, and Fauzan Fadel Muhammad.
