= Government of Indonesia =

- Pemerintah Indonesia
- National emblem of Indonesia
- Formation: 17 August 1945
- Founding document: Constitution of Indonesia
- Jurisdiction: Indonesia
- Website: indonesia.go.id

Legislative branch
- Legislature: People's Consultative Assembly
- Meeting place: Parliamentary Complex

Executive branch
- Leader: President
- Appointer: Elections
- Headquarters: Merdeka Palace
- Main organ: Cabinet
- Departments: 49

Judicial branch
- Court: Supreme Court; Constitutional Court
- Seat: Jakarta

The term Government of the Republic of Indonesia (Indonesian: Pemerintah Republik Indonesia), sometimes also referred to as Government of Indonesia (Pemerintah Indonesia) or the Central Government (Pemerintah Pusat; especially in laws) can have a number of different meanings. At its widest measure, it can refer collectively to the three traditional branches of government – the executive branch, legislative branch and judicial branch. The term is also used colloquially to mean the executive and legislature together, as these are the branches of government responsible for day-to-day governance of the nation and lawmaking. At its narrowest, the term is used to refer to the executive branch in the form of the President of Indonesia, as assisted by the Vice President and the Cabinet, as this is the branch of government responsible for day-to-day governance.

== History ==
=== Liberal democracy phase ===
An era of Liberal Democracy (Indonesian: Demokrasi Liberal) in Indonesia began on August 17, 1950, following the dissolution of the federal United States of Indonesia less than a year after its formation, and ended with the imposition of martial law and President Sukarno's decree regarding the introduction of Guided Democracy on July 5, 1959. It saw a number of important events, including the 1955 Bandung Conference, Indonesia's first general and Constitutional Assembly elections, and an extended period of political instability, with no cabinet lasting as long as two years.

=== Guided Democracy era ===
Guided Democracy (Indonesian: Demokrasi Terpimpin) was the political system in place in Indonesia from 1959 until the New Order began in 1966. It was the brainchild of President Sukarno, and was an attempt to bring about political stability. Sukarno believed that Western-style democracy was inappropriate for Indonesia's situation. Instead, he sought a system based on the traditional village system of discussion and consensus, which occurred under the guidance of village elders.

=== Transition to the New Order ===
Indonesia's transition to the "New Order" in the mid-1960s, ousted the country's first president, Sukarno, after 22 years in the position. One of the most tumultuous periods in the country's modern history, it was the commencement of Suharto's 31-year presidency.

Described as the great dhalang ("puppet master"), Sukarno drew power from balancing the opposing and increasingly antagonistic forces of the army and Indonesian Communist Party (PKI). By 1965, the PKI extensively penetrated all levels of government and gained influence at the expense of the army.

On 30 September 1965, six of the military's most senior officers were killed in an action (generally labelled an "attempted coup") by the so-called 30 September Movement, a group from within the armed forces. Within a few hours, Major General Suharto mobilised forces under his command and took control of Jakarta. Anti-communists, initially following the army's lead, went on a violent purge of communists throughout the country, killing an estimated half million people and destroying the PKI, which was officially blamed for the crisis.

The politically weakened Sukarno was forced to transfer key political and military powers to General Suharto, who had become head of the armed forces. In March 1967, the Indonesian parliament (MPRS) named General Suharto acting president. He was formally appointed president one year later. Sukarno lived under virtual house arrest until his death in 1970. In contrast to the stormy nationalism, revolutionary rhetoric, and economic failure that characterised the early 1960s under the left-leaning Sukarno, Suharto's pro-Western "New Order" stabilised the economy but continued the policies of Pancasila.

=== New order era ===
The New Order (Indonesian: Orde Baru) is the term coined by the second Indonesian President Suharto to characterise his regime as he came to power in 1966. Suharto used this term to contrast his rule with that of his predecessor, Sukarno (dubbed the "Old Order", or Orde Lama). The term "New Order" in more recent times has become synonymous with the Suharto years (1966–1998).

Immediately following the attempted coup in 1965, the political situation was uncertain, but Suharto's New Order found much popular support from groups wanting a separation from Indonesia's post-independence problems. The 'generation of 66' (Angkatan 66) epitomised talk of a new group of young leaders and new intellectual thought. Following Indonesia's communal and political conflicts, and the economic collapse and social breakdown from the late 1950s through to the mid-1960s, the "New Order" was committed to achieving and maintaining political order, economic development, and the removal of mass participation in the political process. The features of the "New Order" established from the late 1960s were thus a strong political role for the military, the bureaucratisation and corporatisation of political and societal organisations, and selective but effective repression of opponents. Strident anti-communism remained a hallmark of the regime for its subsequent 32 years.

Within a few years, however, many of its original allies had become indifferent or averse to the New Order, which comprised a military faction supported by a narrow civilian group. Among much of the pro-democracy movement which forced Suharto to resign in the 1998 Indonesian Revolution and then gained power, the term "New Order" has come to be used pejoratively. It is frequently employed to describe figures who were either tied to the Suharto period, or who upheld the practises of his authoritarian regime, such as corruption, collusion and nepotism (widely known by the acronym KKN: korupsi, kolusi, nepotisme).

=== Reform era ===
Map showing the parties/organisations with the largest vote share per province in Indonesia's elections from 1971 to 2019

The Post-Suharto era in Indonesia began with the fall of Suharto in 1998 during which Indonesia has been in a period of transition, an era known in Indonesia as Reformasi (English: Reform). A more open and liberal political-social environment ensued following the resignation of authoritarian President Suharto, ending the three decades of the New Order period.

A constitutional reform process lasted from 1999 to 2002, with four constitutional amendments producing important changes.

The Indonesian political system before and after the constitutional amendments

Among these are term limits of up to two five-year terms for the President and Vice-President, and measures to institute checks and balances. The highest state institution is the People's Consultative Assembly (MPR), whose functions previously included electing the president and vice-president (since 2004 the president has been elected directly by the people), establishing broad guidelines of state policy, and amending the constitution. The 695-member MPR includes all 550 members of the House of Representatives (People's Representative Council, the DPR) plus 130 "regional representatives" elected by the twenty-six provincial parliaments and sixty-five appointed members from societal groups.

The DPR, which is the premier legislative institution, originally included 462 members elected through a mixed proportional/district representational system and thirty-eight appointed members of the armed forces (TNI) and police (POLRI). TNI/POLRI representation in the DPR and MPR ended in 2004. Societal group representation in the MPR was eliminated in 2004 through further constitutional change.

Having served as rubberstamp bodies in the past, the DPR and MPR have gained considerable power and are increasingly assertive in oversight of the executive branch. Under constitutional changes in 2004, the MPR became a bicameral legislature, with the creation of the Dewan Perwakilan Daerah (DPD), in which each province is represented by four members, although its legislative powers are more limited than those of the DPR. Through his appointed cabinet, the president retains the authority to conduct the administration of the government.

A general election in June 1999 produced the first freely elected national, provincial and regional parliaments in over forty years. In October 1999 the MPR elected a compromise candidate, Abdurrahman Wahid, as the country's fourth president, and Megawati Sukarnoputri—a daughter of Sukarno, the country's first president—as the vice-president. Megawati's PDI-P party had won the largest share of the vote (34%) in the general election, while Golkar, the dominant party during the Soeharto era, came in second (22%). Several other, mostly Islamic parties won shares large enough to be seated in the DPR. Further democratic elections took place in 2004 and 2009.

== Branches ==
=== Executives ===
Office-holders
| Office | Name | Political affiliation | Since | Prior position |
|---|---|---|---|---|
| President of Indonesia | Prabowo Subianto | Gerindra | 20 October 2024 | Minister of Defense |
| Vice President of Indonesia | Vacant | | 12 November 2026 | |

The president and vice-president are selected by vote of the citizens for five-year terms. Prior to 2004, they were chosen by the People's Consultative Assembly. The last election was held on 14 February 2024.

The President of Indonesia is directly elected for a maximum of two five-year terms and is the head of state, commander-in-chief of the armed forces and responsible for domestic governance and policy-making and foreign affairs. The president appoints a cabinet, members of which do not have to be elected members of the legislature.

=== Legislatures ===
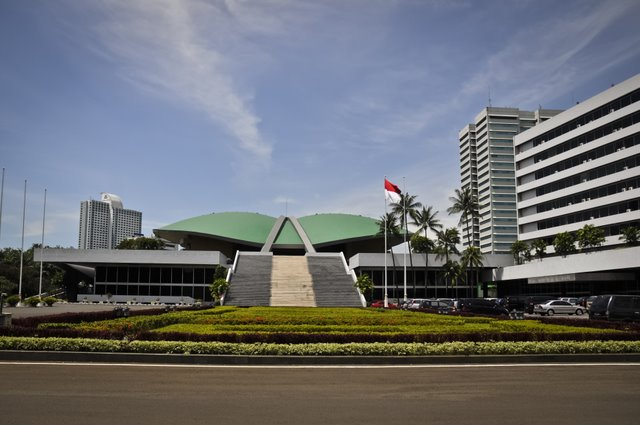
The legislative building complex

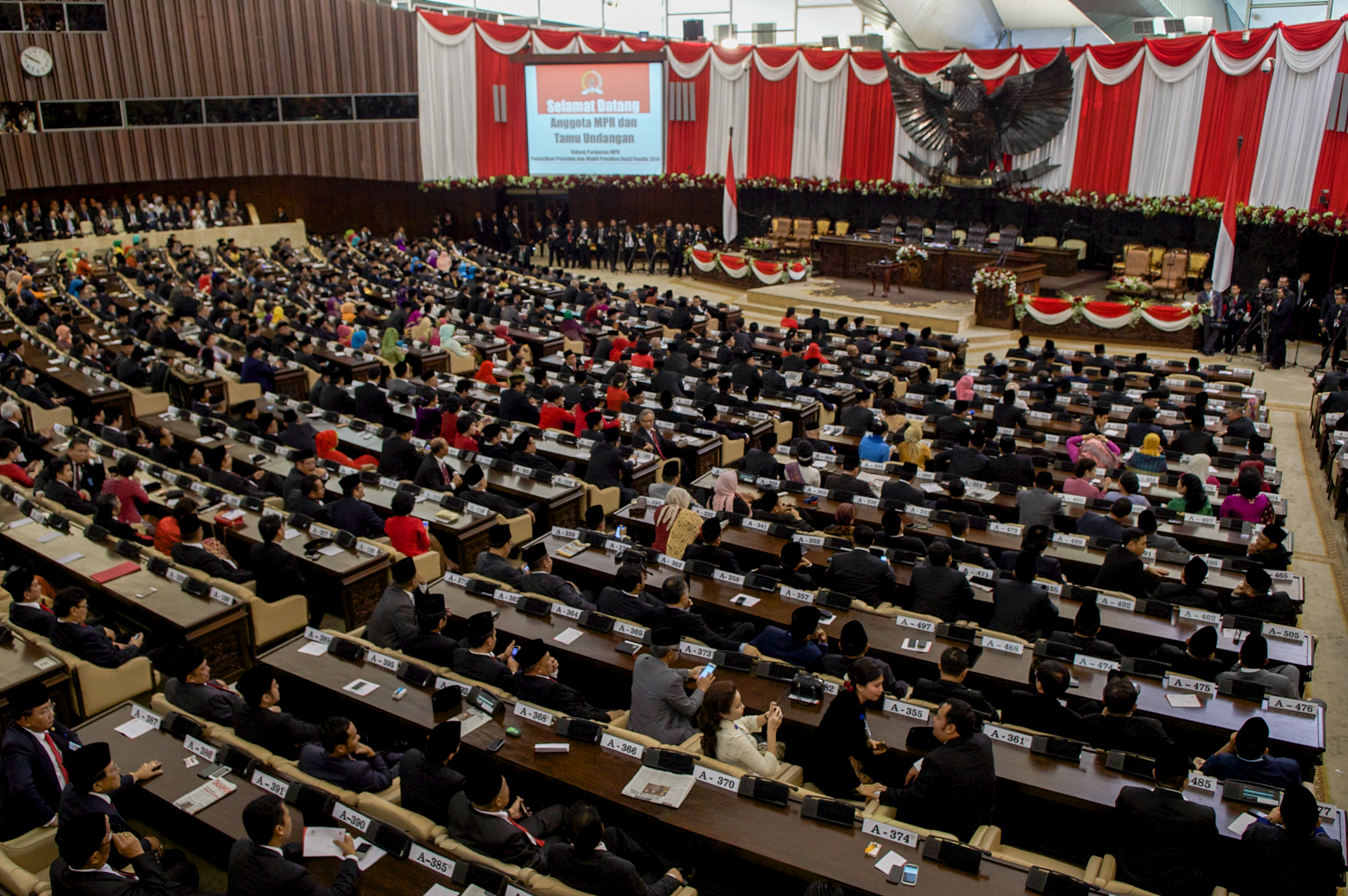
House of Representatives

Office-holders
| Office | Name | Since | Legislative Level |
|---|---|---|---|
| Speaker of the People's Consultative Assembly | Ahmad Muzani | 3 October 2024 | Supreme legislative body |
| Speaker of the Regional Representative Council | Sultan Bachtiar Najamudin | 2 October 2024 | Upper legislative body |
| Speaker of the House of Representatives | Puan Maharani | 1 October 2019 | Lower legislative body |

The MPR is the legislative branch of Indonesia's political system. The MPR is composed of two houses: the lower house, which is commonly called the People's Representative Council (Indonesian: Dewan Perwakilan Rakyat or DPR) and the upper house, which is called the Regional Representative Council (Indonesian: Dewan Perwakilan Daerah or DPD). The DPR parliamentarians are elected through multi-member electoral districts, whereas 4 DPD senators are elected in each of Indonesia's 38 provinces. The DPR holds most of the legislative power because it has the sole power to pass laws. The DPD acts as a supplementary body to the DPR; it can propose bills, offer its opinion and participate in discussions, but it has no legal power. The MPR itself has power outside of those given to the individual houses. It can amend the constitution, inaugurate the president and conduct impeachment procedures. When the MPR acts in this function, it does so by simply combining the members of the two houses.

=== Judiciary ===
The Indonesian Supreme Court (Indonesian: Mahkamah Agung) is the highest level of the judicial branch. Its judges are appointed by the president. The Constitutional Court rules on constitutional and political matters (Indonesian: Mahkamah Konstitusi), while a Judicial Commission (Indonesian: Komisi Yudisial) oversees the judges.

=== Audit Board of Indonesia ===
The Audit Board of Indonesia (Indonesian: Badan Pemeriksa Keuangan) is the high state body responsible for checking the management and accountability of state finances conducted by the central government, local government, other state institutions such as Bank Indonesia, state- and municipally owned enterprises, Public Service Boards, and institutions or other entities that manage state finances.

== See also ==
- Law enforcement in Indonesia
- Constitution of Indonesia
- Flag of Indonesia
- Administrative divisions of Indonesia
- List of presidents of Indonesia
- List of vice presidents of Indonesia
- List of government ministries of Indonesia
- Foreign relations of Indonesia
- Corruption in Indonesia
