= Gusman =

Gusman is both a surname and a given name. Notable people with the name include:

- Irman Gusman (born 1962), Indonesian politician and businessman
- Martina Gusmán (born 1978), Argentine actress and film producer
- Yuli Gusman (born 1943), Russian film director and actor
- Gusman Kosanov (1935–1990), Soviet Russian sprinter
