= Maya Rumantir =

Indonesian singer, actress and politician

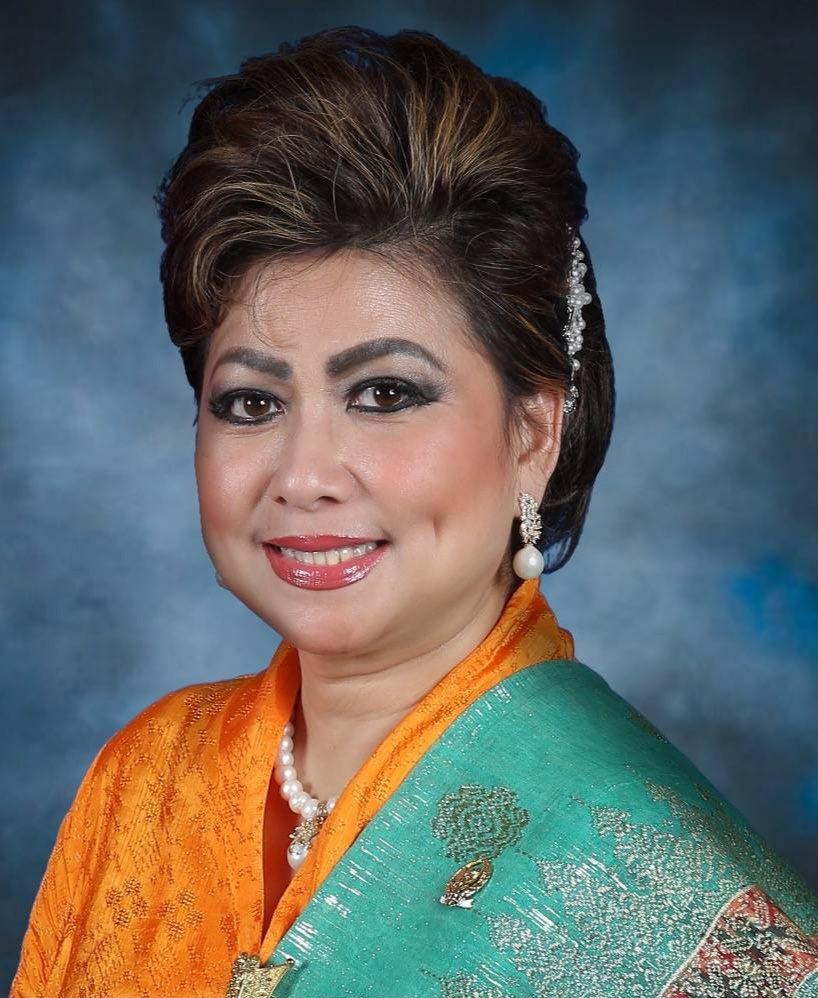
- Official portrait

Senator for North Sulawesi
- Incumbent
- Assumed office 1 October 2014

Personal details
- Born: Maya Olivia Rumantir; 2 April 1964 (age 62) Ujung Pandang, South Sulawesi, Indonesia
- Party: Prosperous Peace Party
- Spouse: Takala Gerald Manumpak Hutasoit (m. 2004)
- Education: University of America (DBA); Pacific Western University (PhD); Columbia University (DPA)
- Occupation: Model, actress, singer and politician
- Musical career
- Genres: Pop and gospel
- Instrument: Vocals
- Labels: Aroma Records; DS Record; Mentari Records; Purnama Records

Maya Olivia Rumantir (born 2 April 1964) is an Indonesian model, actor, singer and politician of Minahasa descent who is among the elected members of the House of Representatives (DPR) for North Sulawesi since 2014. Notably, she is also a businesswoman and church activist who has written multiple spiritual songs.

== Education ==
Maya received two honorary Doctorates in the fields of business administration (DBA) from the University of America in New Orleans, and human resource development (PhD-HRM) from Pacific Western University in Los Angeles. She also holds a doctorate in public administration (DPA) in human communication from Columbia State University, Louisiana.

== Career ==
=== Music career ===
Maya began singing in Ujung Pandang, where she went on to win the 1976 Favourite Child Singer Award and the third place in the South Sulawesi Singer Pop Festival. She put out a lot of albums throughout her peak, which made her a popular vocalist in the 1980s. Her debut record was called Rindunya Hatiku. Subsequently, she put out several albums, including Karnamu (1983), Hatiku Masih Rindu (1982), Daun-Daun Kering (1982), Terlena (1983), Manis Dibibir Pahit Dihati (1984), Bukan Salahku Bukan Juga Salahmu (1984), and Mengapa Kau Lakukan (1986). She stepped away from the entertainment industry and was more involved in politics. In addition to her work, her personal life is frequently in the news.

=== Political career ===
In addition to being a mother and a wife in that period of time, Maya was a vocal politician. Maya was a candidate for the Regional Representative Council (DPD) in the 2014 Legislative Election, running for the North Sulawesi electoral district. She was elected to the DPD for the 2014–2019 term. As a candidate for governor of North Sulawesi, senior artist Maya Rumantir participated in the Golkar Party's fit and proper examination. Rene Manembu stated that the screening team conducted an interview with Maya Rumantir, the North Sulawesi resident now holding the position of DPD member, on a number of topics. Including what, should he be appointed regional head, will be done for North Sulawesi. With 206,496 votes, she qualified for Senayan and was elected as a DPD member for the 2014–2019 term.

In 2015, Maya contends that moral decay has a significant impact on societal attitudes and conduct as a result of globalization. The future of the inhabitants of North Sulawesi is becoming more and more threatened by a variety of crimes, including prostitution, gambling, drinking, and other moral transgressions. Therefore, in North Sulawesi, advancements in morality and spirituality are regarded as strategic issues. Priorities will include a variety of matters, such as initiatives aimed at fostering the growth of North Sulawesi's youth, such as the elimination of drug use, unrestrained sexual behavior, and the culture of intoxication, as well as conflicts between villages that further marginalize the region's residents.

Then, in the 2019 election, Maya came in second among the candidates running for DPD members from North Sulawesi's electoral district (Dapil). She was receiving 168,086 votes at that point. During her visit to the North Sulawesi Province Governor's Office, she stated that she was working in the Electoral District of North Sulawesi during the recess period to make the most of Law No. 17 of 2003 concerning State Finance.

== Personal life ==
Maya was born in Ujung Pandang of South Sulawesi on 2 April 1964. She became President Director of the Maya Gita Human Resources Development Institute and launched the Maya Bhakti Pertiwi Foundation.

Maya and Hutomo Mandala Putra (Tommy Suharto), were said to be close, but things did not work out well in their relationship with rumours about Tommy's mother, Siti Hartinah, did not give him her blessing because of differing religious views. Maya Rumantir and Takala Gerald Manumpak Hutasoit tied the knot in 2004. Kiara Oliveralda Tiurnauli Hutasoit, their daughter, was the only child born of their marriage.

== Filmography ==
Year	Title	Role	Notes
1980	Nostalgia di SMA		Debuting film
1984	Cinta di Balik Noda	As Saskia	

== Discography ==
Her known albums is as follows;

- Bukan Salahku Bukan Juga Salahmu (1981)
- Hatiku Masih Rindu (1982)
- Daun-Daun Kering (1982)
- Rindunya Hatiku (1982)
- Terlena (1983)
- Karnamu (1983)
- Manis Dibibir Pahit Dihati (1984)
- Tak Sendiri Lagi (1984)
- Bukan Salahku Bukan Juga Salahmu (1984)
- Kau Yang Di Sana (1984)
- Manis di Bibir, Pahit di Hati (1984)
- Mengapa Kau Lakukan (1986)
- Indonesia Bersinar, Dunia Bersinar (2012)

== Awards ==
Maya was honoured with numerous national and international honours in the political, social, educational, and artistic domains.

- Favourite Child Singer Award (1976)
- The Best Indonesian Photo Model (1988)
