= Jialyka Maharani =

Indonesian politician

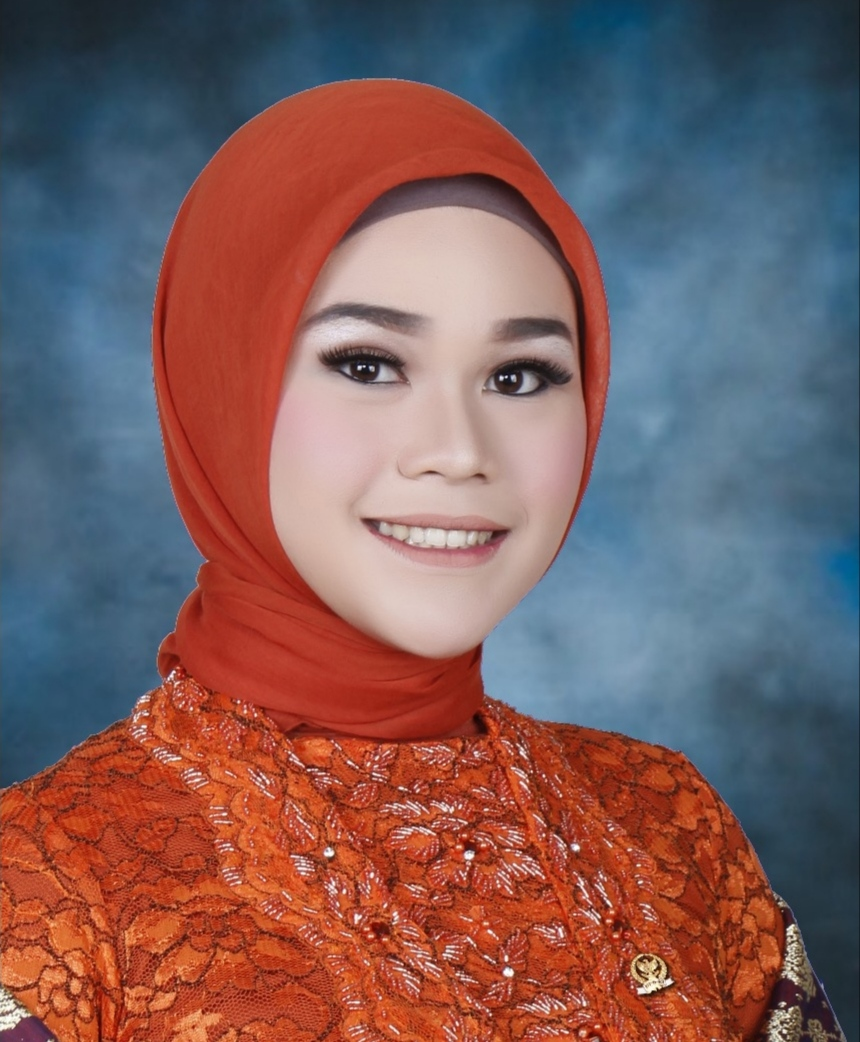
- Official portrait

Senator for South Sumatra
- Incumbent
- Assumed office 1 October 2019

Personal details
- Born: Jialyka Maharani; 20 September 1997 (age 29) Palembang, Indonesia
- Spouse: Fahat Bafadal (m. 2021)
- Education: University of Indonesia; Bina Darma University (BSc)
- Occupation: Politician

Jialyka Maharani (/jɪəˈliː.kɑː/; born 20 September 1997) is an Indonesian politician who is among the elected members of the 2019–2024 Regional Representative Council (DPD) and the youngest member of the People's Consultative Assembly (MPR) of the Republic of Indonesia (RI) from South Sumatra. Becoming the youngest senator elected for the 2019–2024 term, allowed her to receive media attention.

== Education ==
Jialyka received her early education at Sekolah Menengah Pertama Negeri 17 Palembang from 2009 to 2012, Sekolah Menengah Atas Negeri 17 Palembang 2012 to 2015, and Sekolah Dasar Islam Al-Azhar Palembang from 2003 to 2009). She majored in D3 public relations communication throughout her time in the University of Indonesia Vocational Education Program from 2015 to 2018. After joining DPD RI, Jialyka went on to study S1 communication science at Bina Darma University, where she eventually earned a bachelor's degree in 2021.

== Career ==
Soon after receiving her degree, Jialyka was elected to the DPD RI. Since Jialyka and Sabam Sirait were the DPD's youngest and oldest members, they were chosen to serve as the organization's temporary leaders in October 2019. After garnering 337,954 votes in the South Sumatra Electoral District (Dapil), she was able to become a senator.

On 1 October 2019, just 113 senators out of the 136 elected DPD members were present, with Jialyka headed the meeting. She then asked for consent from all present DPD members, and the session was adjourned for five minutes. After that, she read the planned DPD agenda to carry on with the trial. Senators' interruptions, with some went so far as to call Jialyka by name without mentioning the chairman of the court. As per Tribunnews on 28 October 2021, Jialyka urged the younger generation to get involved in politics and contribute to the growth of Indonesia during Youth Pledge Day. She thinks that being young does not prevent someone from entering the political field.

Jialyka called on nations to act diplomatically right now to put an end to the conflict between Israel and Palestine via her social media accounts in October 2023. Before the DPR RI plenary session, she expressed his opinions while donning a Palestinian scarf. She specifically brought to the Indonesian people's attention their struggle for independence.

== Personal life ==
Jialyka was born in Palembang on 20 September 1997, daughter to Ilyas Panji Alam, the former Regent of Ogan Ilir. At 23 years old in June 2021, she wed National Police member Fahat Bafadal.

== Awards ==
Jialyka was given the Bumi Sriwijaya Local Youth Lantern Award on 28 October 2022, as she was regarded as an accomplished and inspirational young woman on both a local and national level. She claims that receiving this honour is a sign of the public's confidence in her and would be reminded to work for Indonesia at all times by this.

- Moeslim Choice Award's Democracy Award
- Bumi Sriwijaya Local Youth Lantern Award (2022)
