= Farouk Muhammad =

Indonesian politician (1949–2021)

Farouk Mohammad
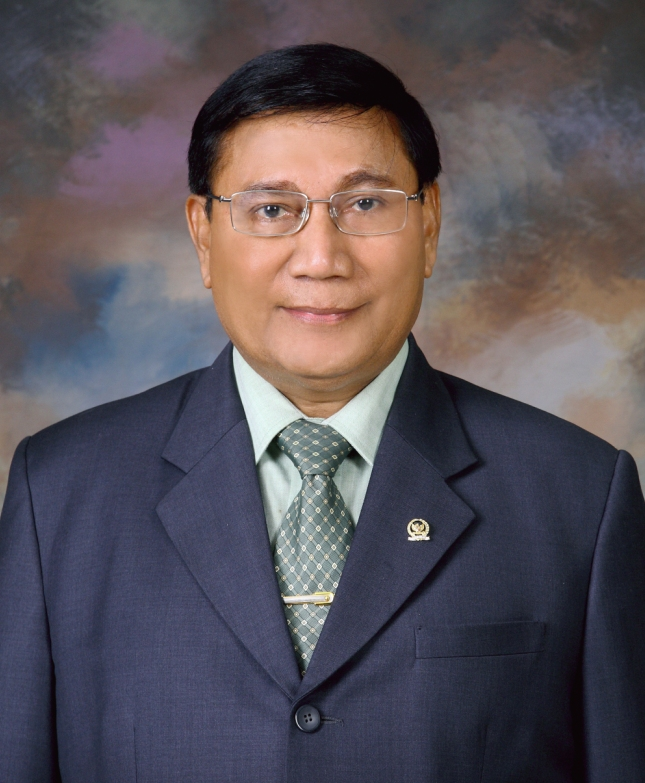
- Born: October 17, 1949; Bima, West Nusa Tenggara, Dutch East Indies
- Died: February 18, 2021 (aged 71); Jakarta, Indonesia
- Education: Akademi Kepolisian (1972)
- Occupation: Police
- Political party: Independent

Farouk Muhammad (Bima, West Nusa Tenggara, 17 October 1949 – Jakarta, 18 February 2021) was an Indonesian police officer and politician. He was Deputy Chair of the Regional Representative Council for the 2014–2017 period from the electoral district of West Nusa Tenggara. He was a Polri officer with his last position as Governor of the Police Science College.
