= Larasati Moriska =

Indonesian politician (born 2002)

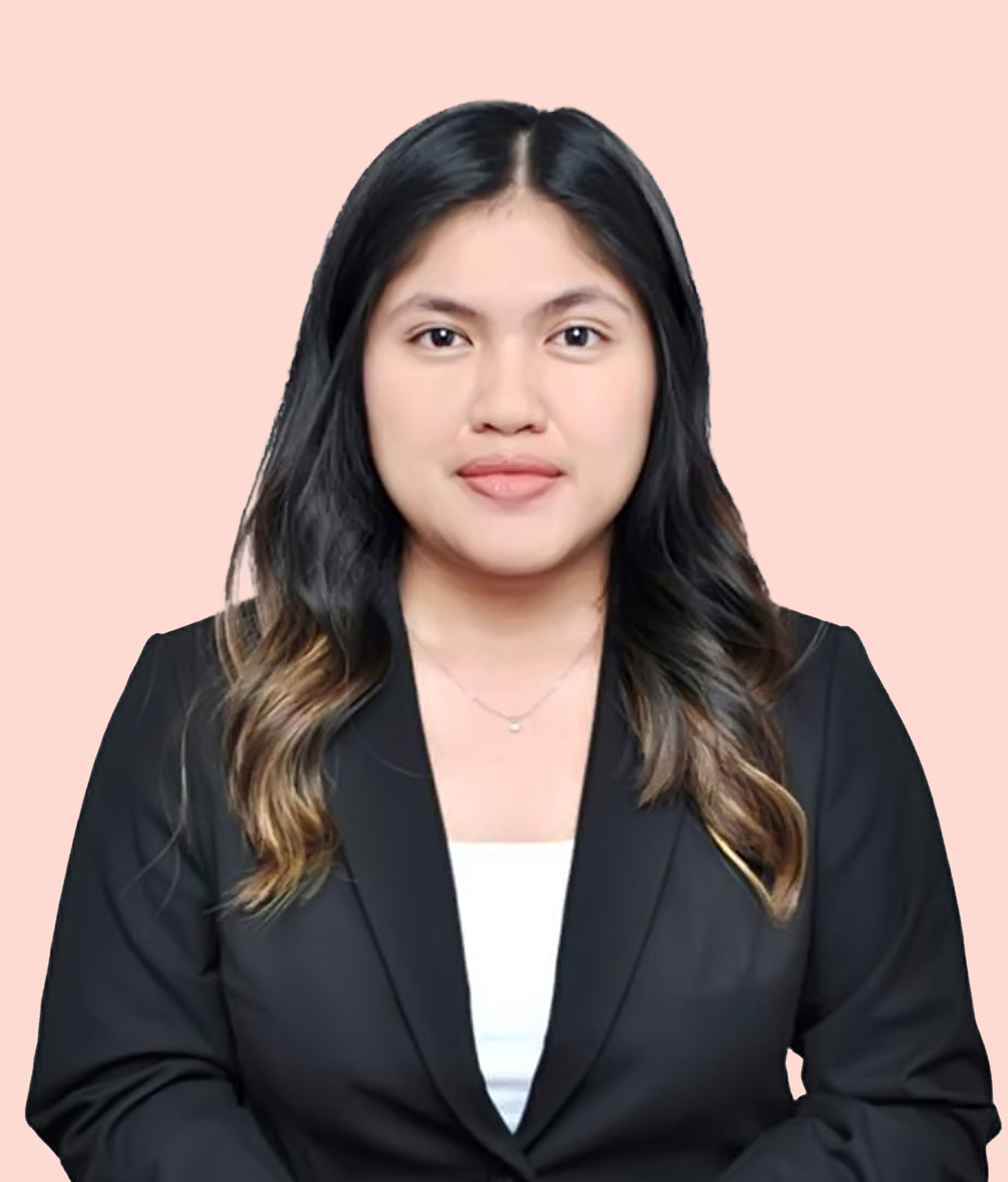
- Larasati Moriska in 2023

Member of the Regional Representative Council
- Incumbent
- Assumed office 1 October 2024
- Constituency: North Kalimantan

Personal details
- Born: 1 January 2002 (age 24)
- Party: Independent
- Relatives: Tamara Moriska (sister); Abdul Hafid Achmad (grandfather); Asmin Laura Hafid (aunt)

Larasati Moriska (born 1 January 2002) is an Indonesian politician serving as a member of the Regional Representative Council since 2024. She is the sister of Tamara Moriska, the granddaughter of Abdul Hafid Achmad, and the niece of Asmin Laura Hafid.
