= La Nyalla Mattalitti =

Indonesian politician

H. La Nyalla Mattalitti
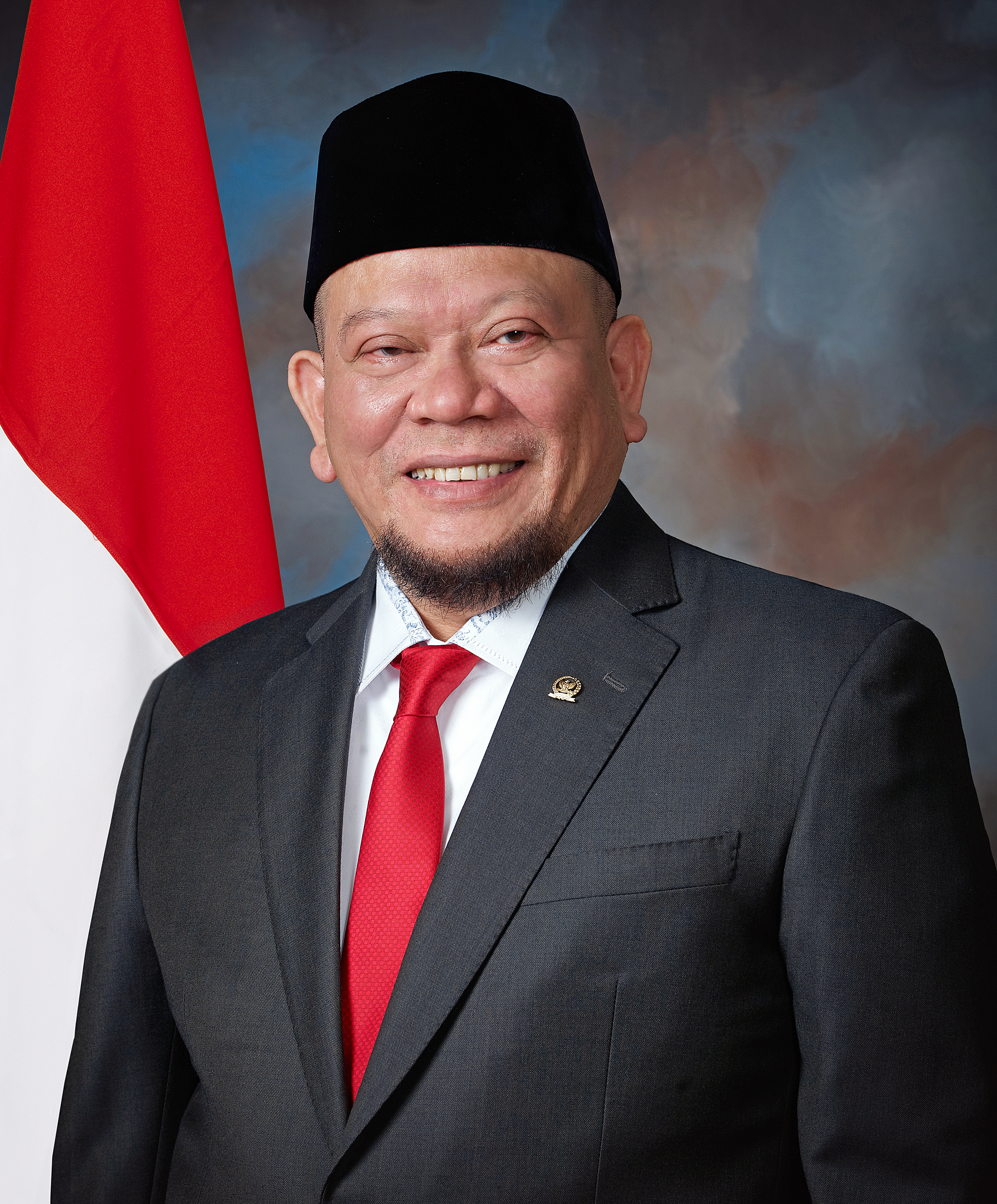
- Official portrait, 2006

6th Speaker of the Senate of Indonesia
- In office 2 October 2019 – 2 October 2024
- Preceded by: Oesman Sapta Odang
- Succeeded by: Sultan Bachtiar Najamudin

Senator for East Java
- Incumbent
- Assumed office 1 October 2019

Chair of the Football Association of Indonesia
- In office 18 April 2015 – 30 May 2015
- Preceded by: Djohar Arifin Husin
- Succeeded by: Edy Rahmayadi

Personal details
- Born: La Nyalla Mahmud Mattalitti; 10 May 1959 (age 67) Jakarta, Indonesia
- Education: Brawijaya University
- Occupation: Politician; businessman

La Nyalla Mahmud Mattalitti (born 10 May 1959) is an Indonesian politician. Currently speaker of the Regional Representative Council, he was formerly chairman of the Football Association of Indonesia (PSSI).

== Career ==
During the first half of Djohar Arifin Husin's tenure, Mattalitti led the Indonesian Football Savior Committee (KPSI). He is also known as one of the prominent member of Pemuda Pancasila, a paramilitary organization.

Between the 2009 presidential election through 2018, he was a staunch supporter of Prabowo Subianto and his party Gerindra. He the denounced the party citing demands by Prabowo and Gerindra for to him to pay Rp40 billion (around $2.5 million) for the East Java gubernatorial nomination in the 2018 election. He went on to support Prabowo's and once his own former political rival Joko Widodo in the 2019 national election, later apologizing for spreading a hoax that stated Widodo is a communist.

Also in 2019 election, he ran for a seat in the Indonesian Senate from East Java. He was elected as a member of the Regional Representative Council of Indonesia in the 2019 election from the electoral district of East Java. The vote acquisition reached 2.2 million more. LaNyalla was elected as Chairman of the DPD RI by outperforming three other candidates, Nono Sampono, Mahyudin, and Sultan Baktiar Najamudin.
