= Angkatan 66 =

Angkatan 66, or the "generation of 66", refers to hopes within Indonesia for a generation of young leaders and a new intellectual life following the Fall of Sukarno and the establishment of Suharto's New Order in the mid-1960s.

The New Order had begun with much popular support and high hopes that the troubles of Sukarno's era were over. Within a few years, however, the New Order elite, with the military and a small civilian faction at its centre, had alienated many original allies.
