= List of speakers of the Regional Representative Council of Indonesia =

Speaker of Regional Representative Council of Indonesia
- Insignia of the Regional Representative Council (Senate) of Indonesia

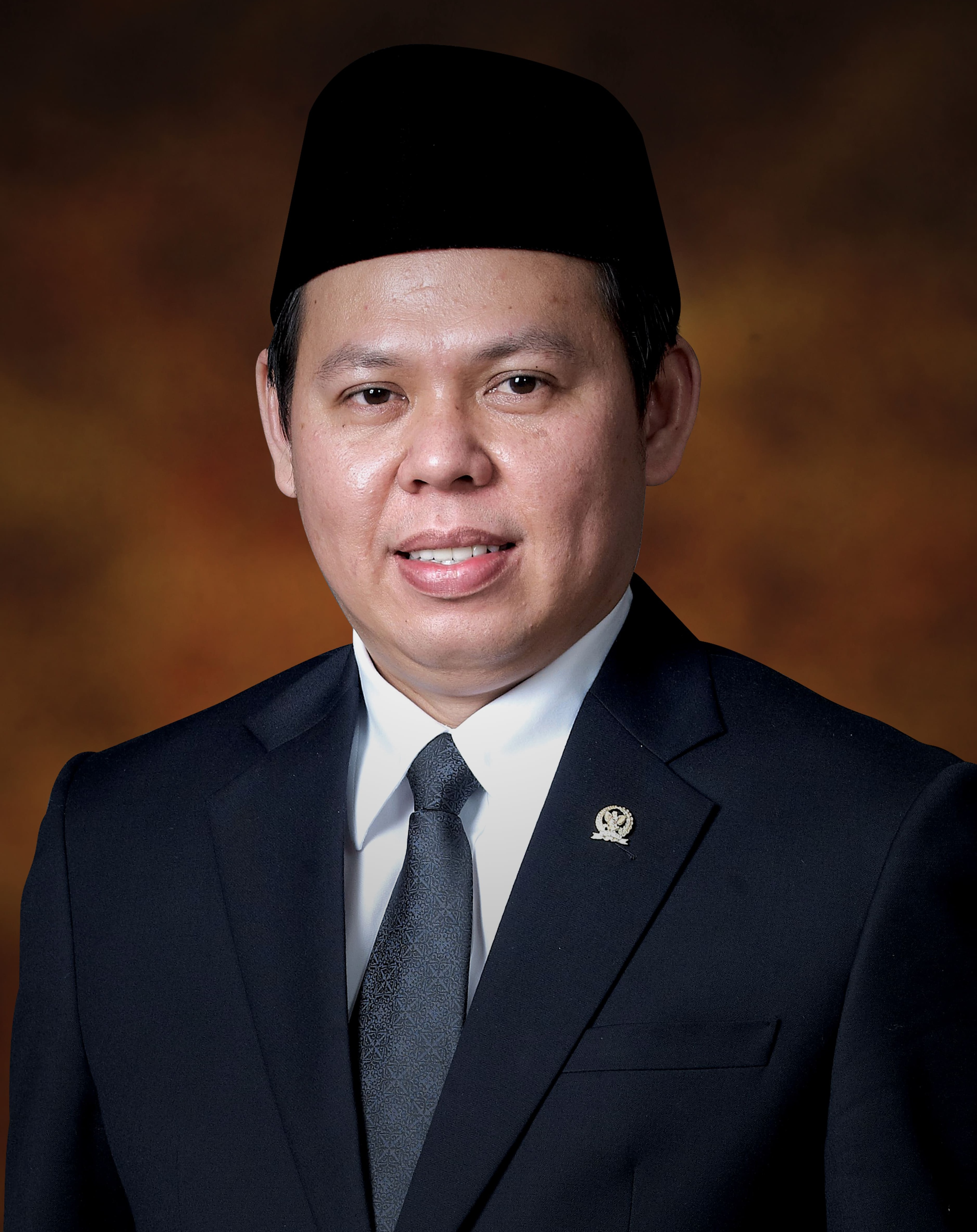
- Incumbent; Sultan Bachtiar Najamudin since 2 October 2024
- Regional Representative Council
- Style: Mr. Speaker (informal – male); Madam Speaker (informal – female); The Right Honorable (formal); His Excellency (Respected Title)
- Status: Presiding officer
- Seat: MPR/DPR/DPD building, Jakarta
- Appointer: Regional Representative Council of Indonesia
- Term length: 5 years
- Constituting instrument: Constitution of Indonesia
- Formation: 6 October 2004; 21 years ago
- First holder: Ginandjar Kartasasmita

This is a list of speakers of the Regional Representative Council, the upper house of Indonesia. This list includes preceding body, the speaker of the Senate of the United States of Indonesia.

== Speaker of the Senate of the United States of Indonesia ==
No	Portrait	Name	Assumed office	Left office	Constituency	Term	Deputy	Notes
1		Melkias Agustinus Pellaupessy (1906–?)	27 February 1950	15 August 1950	East Indonesia	1	Teuku Muhammad Hasan	

== Speakers of the Regional Representative Council ==
No.	Portrait	Name	Assumed office	Left office	Constituency	Term	Deputies
1		Ginandjar Kartasasmita (born 1941)	1 October 2004	30 September 2009	West Java	1	Irman Gusman; La Ode Ida
2		Irman Gusman (born 1962)	2 October 2009	30 September 2014	West Sumatra	2	GKR Hemas; La Ode Ida
2		Irman Gusman (born 1962)	2 October 2014	11 October 2016	West Sumatra	3	GKR Hemas; Farouk Muhammad
3		Mohammad Saleh (born 1966)	11 October 2016	3 April 2017	Bengkulu	3	GKR Hemas; Farouk Muhammad
4		Oesman Sapta Odang (born 1950)	4 April 2017	30 September 2019	West Kalimantan	3	Nono Sampono; Damayanti Lubis
5		La Nyalla Mattalitti (born 1959)	2 October 2019	2 October 2024	East Java	4	Nono Sampono; Mahyudin; Sultan Bachtiar Najamudin
6		Sultan Bachtiar Najamudin (born 1979)	2 October 2024	Incumbent	Bengkulu	5	GKR Hemas; Yorrys Raweyai; Tamsil Linrung

== Bibliography ==
- Djuana, Mohammad; Sulwan (1956), Tata-negara Indonesia [Government of Indonesia] (in Indonesian), Jakarta: Groningen
- Tim Penyusun Sejarah (1970), Seperempat Abad Dewan Perwakilan Rakyat Republik Indonesia [A Quarter Century of the People's Representative Council of the Republic of Indonesia] (PDF) (in Indonesian), Jakarta: Sekretariat DPR-GR

== See also ==
- List of deputy speakers of the Regional Representative Council of Indonesia
- List of temporary speakers and deputy speakers of the Regional Representative Council
