= Irman Gusman =

Indonesian politician and businessman

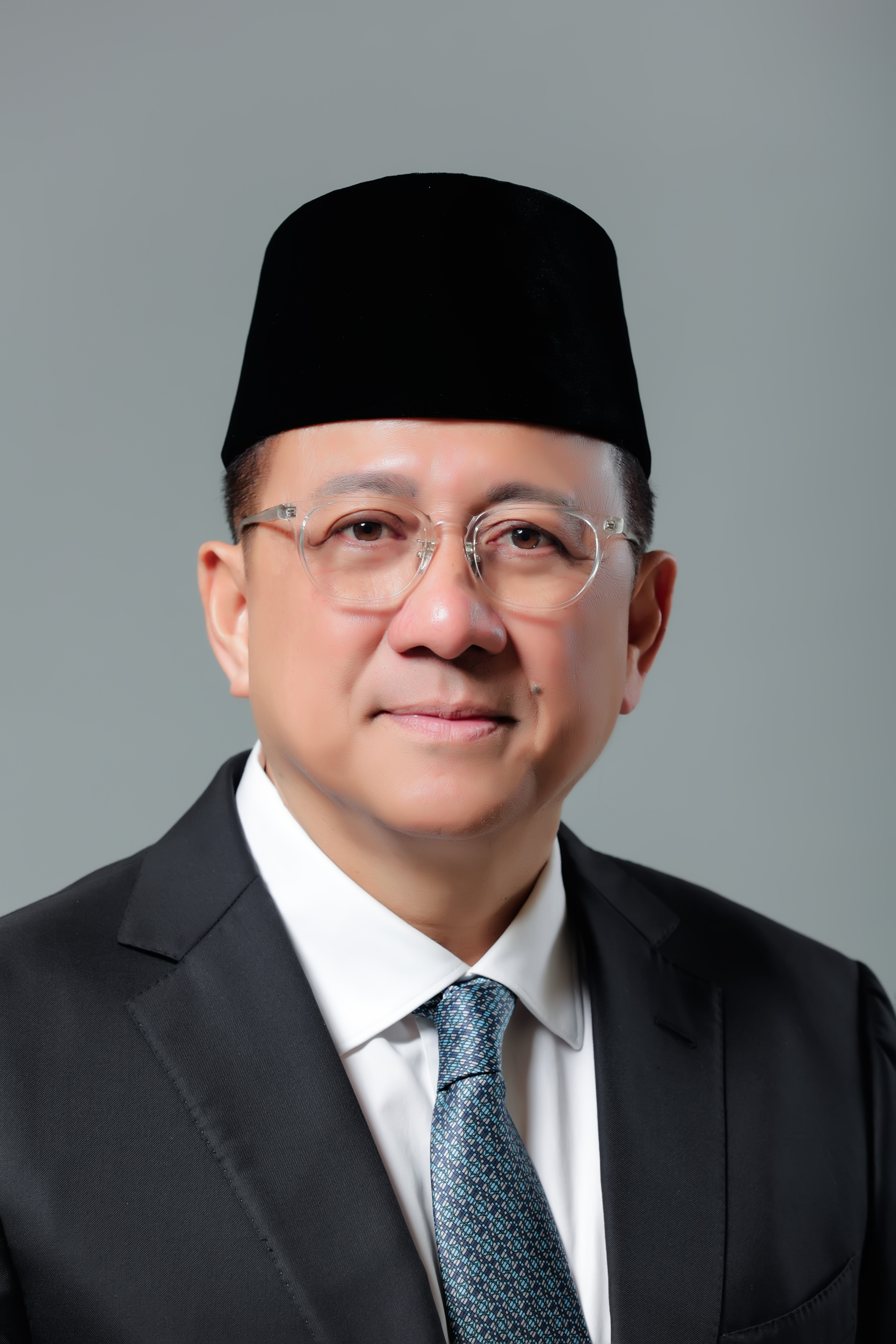

2nd Speaker of the Senate of Indonesia
- In office 1 October 2009 – 5 October 2016
- Preceded by: Ginandjar Kartasasmita
- Succeeded by: Mohammad Saleh

Deputy Speaker of the Senate of Indonesia
- In office 1 October 2004 – 1 October 2009

Senator for West Sumatra
- Incumbent
- Assumed office 1 October 2024
- In office 1 October 2004 – 5 October 2016

Personal details
- Born: 11 February 1962 (age 64) Padangpanjang, West Sumatra, Indonesia
- Spouse: Liestyana Rizal Gusman
- Children: 3
- Education: Christian University of Indonesia; University of Bridgeport

Irman Gusman (born 11 February 1962) is an Indonesian politician and businessman. He is a former speaker of the Regional Representative Council (DPD) of Indonesia, who became the first Indonesian parliamentary leader to be elected for two consecutive terms. This earned him the nickname Pejuang daerah (lit. "Regional warrior", with "regional" as in the House of Regional Representatives).

== Early life ==
Gusman was born in Padang Panjang, West Sumatra on 11 February 1962 to Gusman Gaus and Janimar Kamili. His father was rector of the Muhammadiyah University of West Sumatra, while his mother was the daughter of gold traders.

Gusman completed his undergraduate education at the Faculty of Economics of the Christian University of Indonesia (UKI), where he was chairman of the Student Senate. He subsequently obtained a Master of Business Administration at the Graduate School of Business of the University of Bridgeport.

== Political career ==
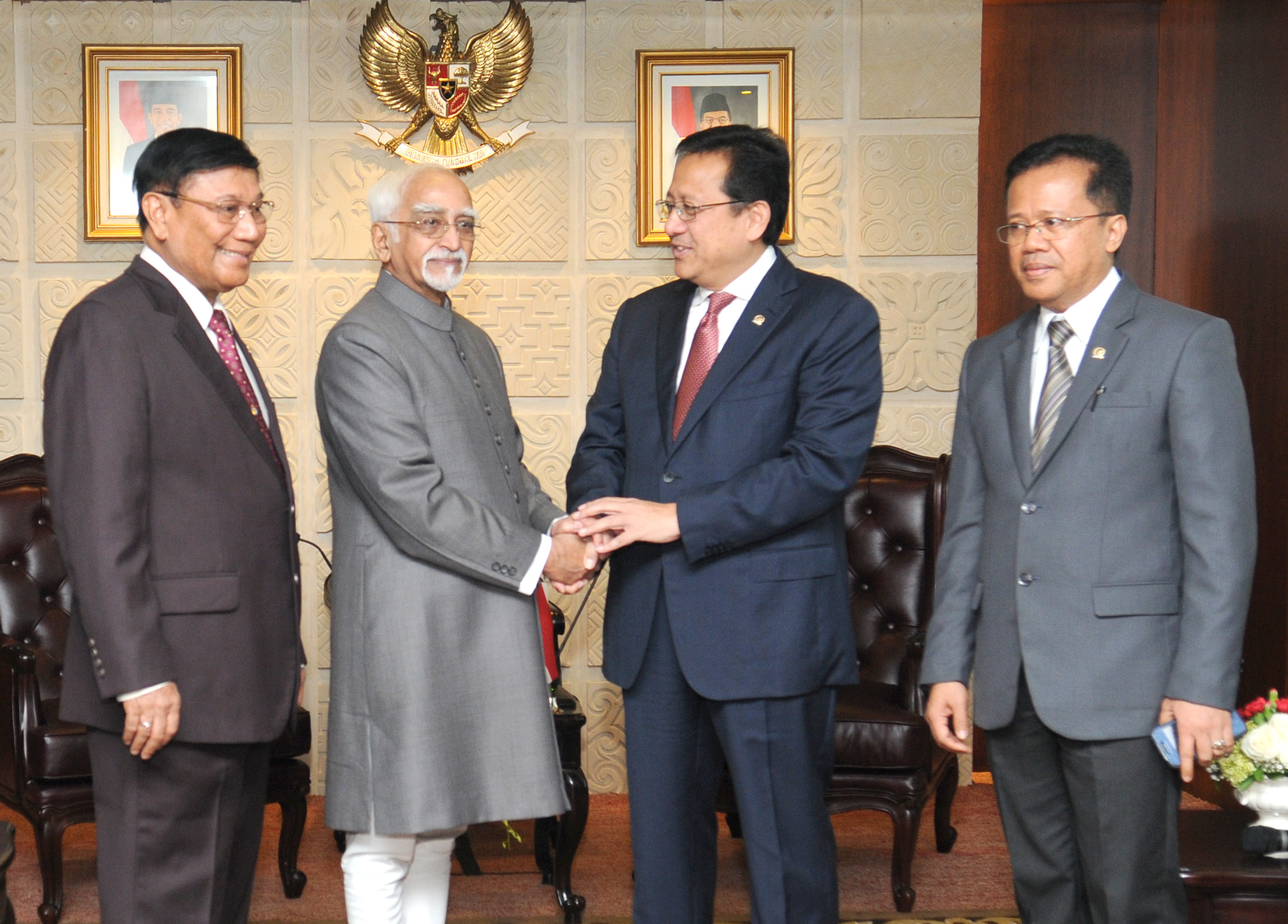
Vice President of India, Mohammad Hamid Ansari being received by the Speaker of the Upper House of Indonesian Parliament, Irman Gusman, in Jakarta, 2015

Irman Gusman is one of the major political figures of the post-Suharto era. He fought for the need of recognition and accommodation of regional interests at the various state institutions. His political stance is based on Indonesia being a multicultural nation. Together with Ginandjar Kartasasmita and associates, Gusman was involved in the establishment of the House of Regional Representatives (DPD), a new checks and balances system within the national government system.

Irman Gusman began his political career in 1999 as member of the People's Consultative Assembly (MPR), representing West Sumatra. In 2004, he was elected member of the newly formed DPD, representing West Sumatra and became vice-chairman of the DPD with chairman Ginandjar Kartasasmita as its speaker. Irman was elected chairman of the DPD on 2 October 2009, having received 81 votes over his opponent Laode Ida's 46 votes. He began his second term on 2 October 2014, after winning from retired police general Farouk Muhammad of West Nusa Tenggara province, with 66 against 53 votes.

On 5 October 2016 Irman was officially discharged from his role as speaker following his controversial Sept. 17 arrest for allegedly accepting bribes. He was later sentenced to 4 years and 6 months in jail by Central Jakarta Graft Court, but its verdict was annulled on 24 September 2019 by the Supreme Court.

== Business career ==
Positions held:

- Expert Council passionate Minang (1999-2003)
- General Treasurer ICMI (2000-2005)
- Regional Chairman of the Economic Advisory Council Muhammadiyah West Sumatra Province (2000-2005)
- Vice Chairman of the Board of ICMI (2005-2010)
- Trustees of Andalas University in Padang
- Trustees of West Sumatra Muhammadiyah University in Padang
- Honorary Council ESQ
- Commissioner of PT Padang Industrial Park (PIP)
- Main Commissioner of PT Khage Lestari Timber
- Main Commissioner of PT Sumatera Korea Motor
- Commissioner of PT Abdi Bangsa, Tbk
- Independent Commissioner of Media Nusantara Citra, Tbk
- President Director of PT Prinavin Prakarsa
- Main Commissioner of PT Guthri Pasaman Nusantara
- Main Commissioner of PT Kopitime DotCom, Tbk

== Personal life ==
Irman married Liestyana Rizal Gusman from Sungai Batang, Maninjau. They have two daughters (Irviandari Alestya Gusman and Irvianjani Audreya Gusman) and a son (Irviandra Fathan Gusman).

== Honours ==
=== National ===
- Indonesia
  - Star of Mahaputera, 2nd Class (Indonesian: Bintang Mahaputera Adipradana)

=== Foreign honours ===
- United Kingdom
  - Honorary Knight Commander of the Order of St Michael and St George - Sir.

== See also ==
- Minangkabau
- Ginandjar Kartasasmita
