= Sultan Bachtiar Najamudin =

Indonesian politician (born 1979)

Sultan Baktiar Najamudin
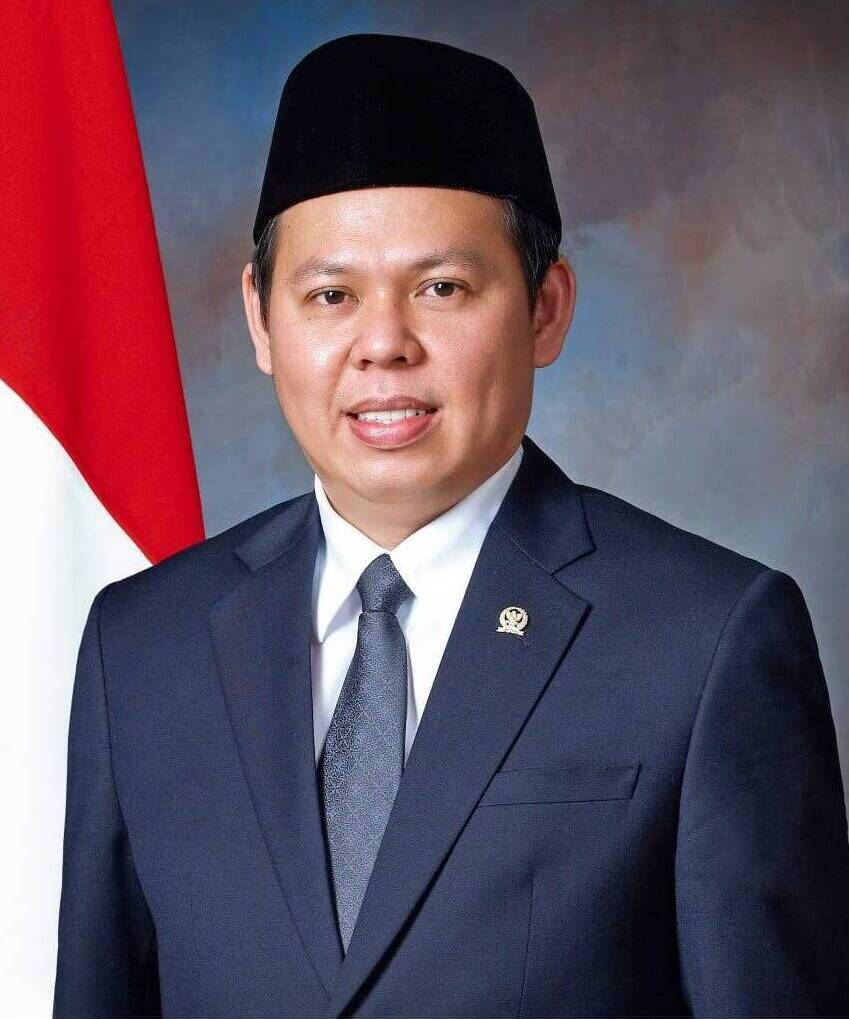
- Official portrait, 2019

Speaker of the Regional Representative Council
- Incumbent
- Assumed office 2 October 2024
- Preceded by: La Nyalla Mattalitti

Deputy Governor of Bengkulu
- In office 4 July 2013 – 1 December 2015
- Preceded by: Junaidi Hamsyah
- Succeeded by: Rohidin Mersyah

Personal details
- Born: 11 May 1979 (age 47) South Bengkulu, Bengkulu, Indonesia

Sultan Baktiar Najamudin (born 11 May 1979) is an Indonesian politician who has been speaker of the Regional Representative Council (DPD) since 2024. Initially serving in the DPD from 2009 to 2013, and he rejoined in 2019. He was deputy governor of Bengkulu from 2013 to 2015, and deputy speaker of the council from 2019 to 2024.

== Early life ==
Sultan Bachtiar Najamudin was born in Anggut, Pino, South Bengkulu, on 11 May 1979, to Najamudin and Nuraini. He attended Gedung Agung Pino Public Elementary School, Ulu Talo State Junior High School, State Senior High School 1 Manna, and State Senior High School 3 Manna. He graduated from the University of Indonesia with a bachelor's degree and Prof. Dr. Moestopo University with a master's degree.

Najamudin and his brother Agusrin Najamuddin, who later served as governor of Bengkulu, moved to Jakarta, where he worked as a food vendor and air condition repairman.

== Career ==
Najamudin won a seat in the Regional Representative Council (DPD) representing the Bengkulu electoral district in the 2009 election. He resigned from the DPD to run for deputy governor of Bengkulu and served from 2013 to 2015. He ran for governor of Bengkulu in 2014, but lost to Ridwan Mukti. He was elected to the DPD in 2019, and reelected in 2024.

Najamudin served as deputy chair of the DPD from 2019 to 2024. On 2 October 2024, he defeated La Nyalla Mattalitti, who he served as deputy chair under, to become speaker.

== Personal life ==
Najamudin has a net worth of RP 5.3 billion, including RP 3.998 billion in land.

== Honours ==
- Star of the Republic of Indonesia, 3rd Class (Indonesian: Bintang Republik Indonesia Utama) (25 August 2025)
- Star of Mahaputera, 5th Class (Indonesian: Bintang Mahaputera Nararya) (14 August 2024)
