= Regional Representative Council =

Upper house of Indonesia's parliament

Coordinates: 6°12′37″S 106°48′00″E

Regional Representative Council Dewan Perwakilan Daerah
- 2024–2029 Period

Type
- Type: Upper house of the People's Consultative Assembly

History
- Established: 1 October 2004; 21 years ago
- Preceded by: Utusan Daerah (Regional Representatives)
- New session started: 1 October 2024

Leadership
- Speaker: Sultan Bachtiar Najamudin (Bengkulu) since 2 October 2024
- Deputy Speaker: GKR Hemas (Yogyakarta) since 2 October 2024
- Deputy Speaker: Yorrys Raweyai (Central Papua) since 2 October 2024
- Deputy Speaker: Tamsil Linrung (South Sulawesi) since 2 October 2024

Structure
- Seats: 152
- Political groups: Nonpartisan (152)
- Length of term: Five years
- Authority: On the area of regional governments only: Propose and give advice on bills to the lower house; Oversight on the execution of laws; No law-making power

Elections
- Voting system: Single non-transferable vote
- First election: 5 April 2004
- Last election: 14 February 2024
- Next election: 2029

Meeting place
- Nusantara V Building, Parliamentary Complex; Jakarta, Indonesia

Website
- dpd.go.id

The Regional Representative Council (Indonesian: Dewan Perwakilan Daerah, DPD; alternatively translatable as the House of Regions or the House of Regional Representatives or the Senate of Indonesia), is one of two parliamentary chambers in Indonesia. Together with the House of Representatives (DPR), it makes up the national legislative body, the People's Consultative Assembly (MPR). Under Indonesia's constitution, the authority of the DPD is limited to areas related to regional governments and can only propose and give advice on bills to the DPR. Unlike the DPR, the DPD has no direct law-making or legal power. Its members are referred to as senators on the official DPD X page.

== History ==
The idea of regional representation in parliament was initially accommodated in the original version of the 1945 Constitution, with the concept of Utusan Daerah (Regional Representatives) in the MPR, along with Utusan Golongan (Group Representatives) and members of the DPR. This is regulated in Article 2 of the constitution, which states that "The MPR consists of members of the DPR plus representatives from regions and groups, according to the rules established by law". This loose arrangement was then further regulated by various laws and regulations.

In the Constitution of the United States of Indonesia enacted in 1949, the idea was realized in the form of Senat Republik Indonesia Serikat (Senate of the United States of Indonesia), representing the states and working side by side with the DPR.

As a replacement for Utusan Daerah, the DPD was created by the third amendment to the 1945 Constitution enacted on 9 November 2001 in a move towards bicameralism. The DPD does not have the revising powers of an upper house like the United States Senate. Article 22D restricts the DPD to dealing with bills on "regional autonomy, the relationship of central and local government, formation, expansion and merger of regions, management of natural resources and other economic resources, and Bills related to the financial balance between the centre and the regions."

The International Foundation for Electoral Systems conducted a tracking survey in the Indonesian legislative elections in 2004 which showed that not all voters knew how to vote for candidates for the new Regional Representative Council, or were even aware of its existence. The first 128 elected senators of the DPD were sworn in for the first time on 1 October 2004.

The DPD is not a true upper house, because the power of the DPD is relatively weak compared to the older chamber, the DPR, notably, it has no direct law-making or the power to veto bills. According to Indonesian constitutional scholar Jimly Asshiddiqie, the relative weakness of the DPD was a result of a compromise in the committee responsible for the constitutional amendment. The reformist faction wanted a strong second chamber in addition to the existing DPR to strengthen checks and balances, but the conservative faction opposed this.

== Membership ==
Article 22C of the Constitution says that all members of the DPD are elected through the same legislative election every five years, along with the members of the House of Representatives. The total number of senators is limited so that it does not exceed one-third of that of DPR. Each of the 38 provinces of Indonesia elect 4 members to the DPD, for a total of 152. At the inaugural 2004 legislative election, there were 32 provinces resulting in 128 senators, but as new provinces have been created the number of senators has been increased in subsequent elections. The number of senators were 132 starting in 2009, 136 starting in 2014, and 152 starting in 2024.

Senators are elected on a non-partisan basis using single non-transferable voting. However, many candidates in the 2004 election had links to the parties represented in the House of Representatives, the Dewan Perwakilan Rakyat or DPR. The senators elected to the Council represent the interests of their provinces, therefore the DPD can be seen as a reform of the utusan daerah (regional representatives) of the MPR during the Suharto era, which was appointed to the MPR at the president's discretion.

== Powers and structure ==
The DPD can propose regional bills to the House of Representatives and its senators must be heard on any regional bill proposed by the said House.

== Miscellaneous ==
The acronym DPD is a common one in Indonesia. In political parties, it usually stands for Dewan Pimpinan Daerah (Local Leadership Council) and is seated at each provincial capital. It should not be confused with the legislative body.
