= List of incumbent regional heads and deputy regional heads in Gorontalo =

The following is an article about the list of Regional Heads and Deputy Regional Heads in 6 regencies/cities in Gorontalo who are currently still serving.

== List ==
| Regency/ City | Photo of the Regent/ Mayor | Regent/ Mayor | Photo of Deputy Regent/ Mayor | Deputy Regent/ Mayor | Taking Office | End of Office (Planned) | Ref. |
|---|---|---|---|---|---|---|---|
| Boalemo; Regency List of Regents/Deputy Regents | | Rum Pagau | | Lahmuddin Hambali | 20 February 2025 | 20 February 2030 | |
| Bone Bolango; Regency List of Regents/Deputy Regents | | Ismet Mile | | Risman Tolingguhu | 20 February 2025 | 20 February 2030 | |
| Gorontalo; Regency List of Regents/Deputy Regents | | Sofyan Puhi | | Tonny S. Junus | 20 February 2025 | 20 February 2030 | |
| North Gorontalo; Regency List of Regents/Deputy Regents | | Thariq Modanggu | | Nurjana Hasan Yusuf | 19 June 2025 | 19 June 2030 | |
| Pohuwato; Regency List of Regents/Deputy Regents | | Saipul A. Mbuinga | | Iwan Sjafruddin Adam | 20 February 2025 | 20 February 2030 | |
| Gorontalo; City List of Mayors/Deputy mayors | | Adhan Dambea | | Indra Gobel | 20 February 2025 | 20 February 2030 | |

Notes

- "Commencement of office" is the inauguration date at the beginning or during the current term of office. For acting regents/mayors, it is the date of appointment or extension as acting regent/mayor.
- Based on the Constitutional Court decision Number 27/PUU-XXII/2024, the Governor and Deputy Governor, Regent and Deputy Regent, and Mayor and Deputy Mayor elected in 2020 shall serve until the inauguration of the Governor and Deputy Governor, Regent and Deputy Regent, and Mayor and Deputy Mayor elected in the 2024 national simultaneous elections as long as the term of office does not exceed 5 (five) years.

== See also ==
- Gorontalo
