= Indra Yasin =

Indonesian politician (1954–2022)

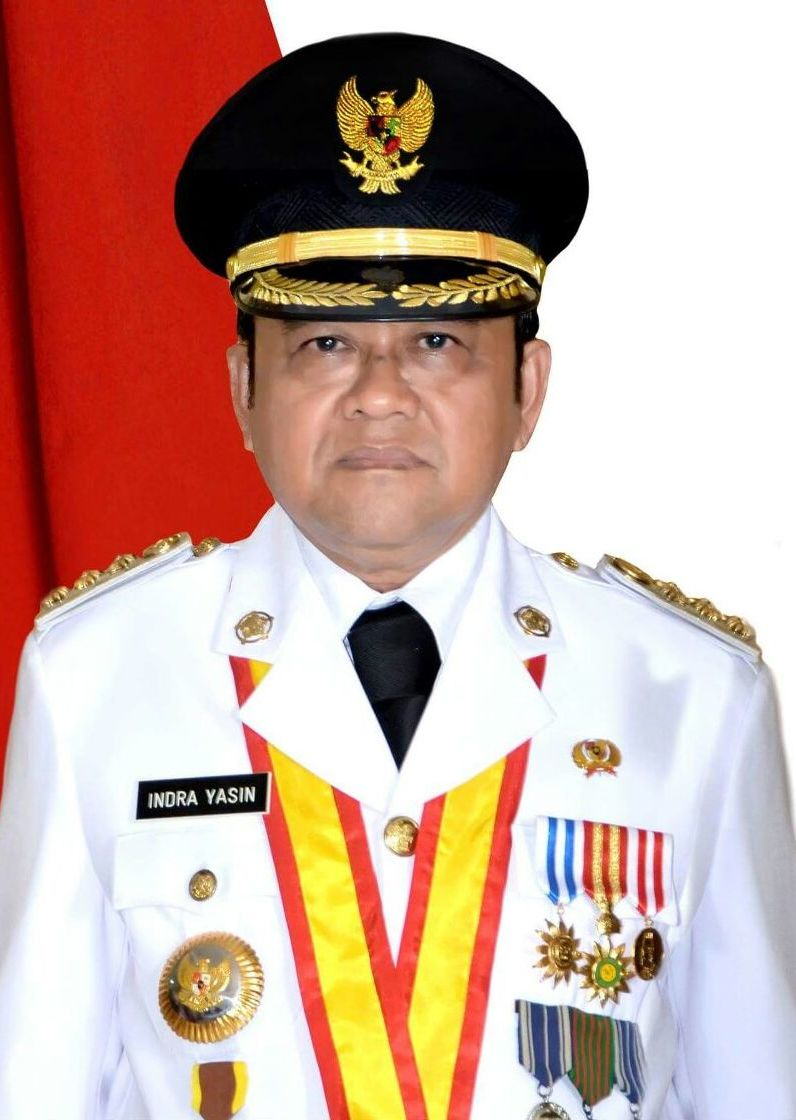
- Yasin in 2013

Regent of North Gorontalo
- In office 16 January 2012 – 3 March 2022
- Preceded by: Rusli Habibie
- Succeeded by: Thariq Modanggu (acting)

Personal details
- Born: 28 June 1954 Gorontalo, Indonesia
- Died: 3 March 2022 (aged 67) Gorontalo, Indonesia
- Party: Golkar (1978–2018); Nasdem (2018–2021); PPP (2021–2022)
- Education: Hasanuddin University

Indra Yasin (28 June 1954 – 3 March 2022) was an Indonesian politician. A member of Golkar, Nasdem, and lastly the United Development Party, he served as Regent of North Gorontalo from 2012 to 2022. He died in Gorontalo on 3 March 2022, at the age of 67.
