= Nani Wartabone =

Indonesian politician and national hero (1907–1986)

Haji Nani Wartabone
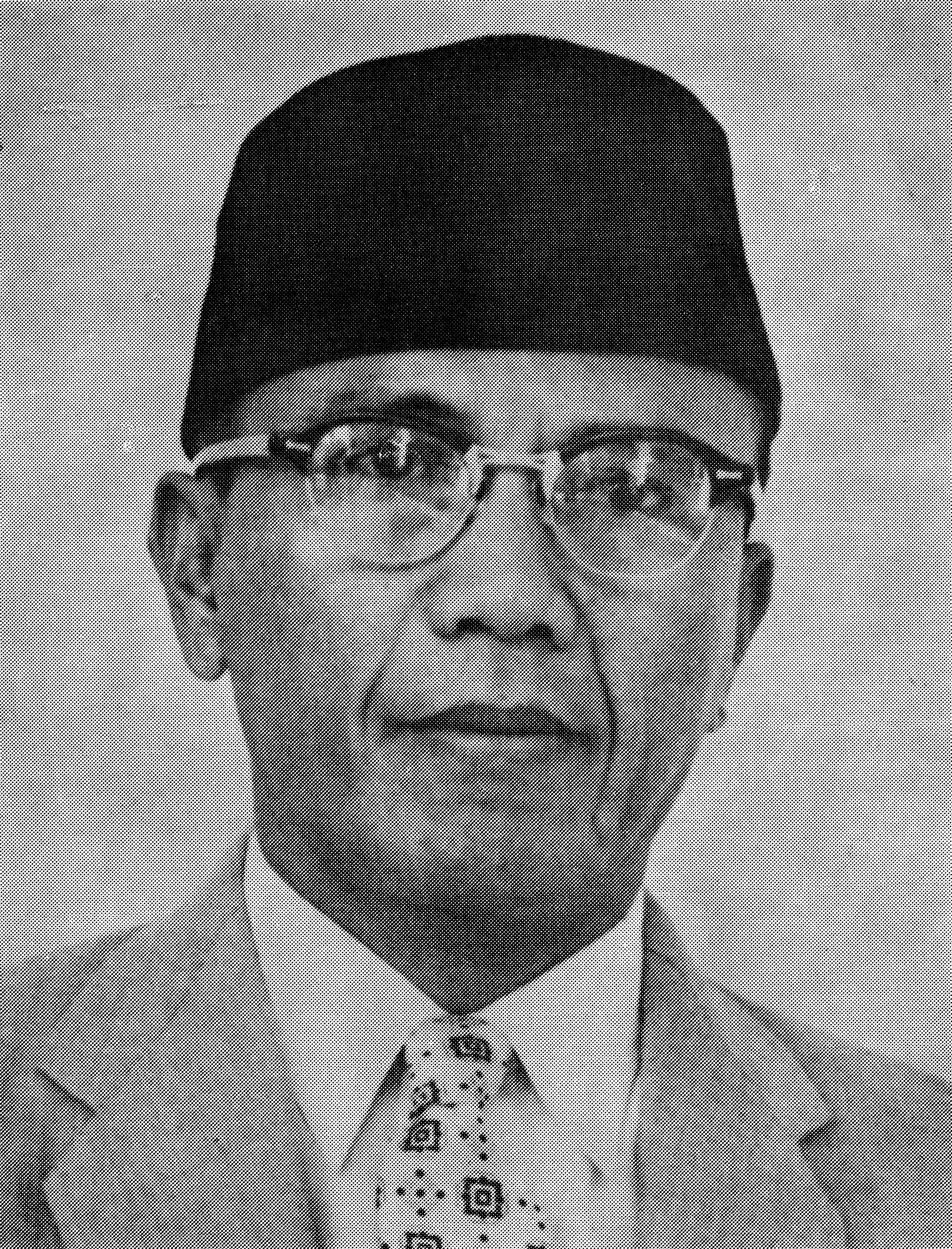
- Portrait, date unknown

Personal details
- Born: Nani Wartabone; 30 April 1907 Suwawa, Dutch East Indies
- Died: 3 January 1986 (aged 78) Kasuari Street No. 81, Gorontalo, Indonesia
- Resting place: Bube Baru, Suwawa, Bone Bolango Regency
- Party: Indonesian National Party (1928–1931); Partindo (1931–1937)
- Occupation: Politician

Nani Wartabone (30 April 1907 – 3 January 1986) was an Indonesian politician and nationalist from Gorontalo. He was declared a National Hero of Indonesia by President Megawati Sukarnoputri on 6 November 2003. Wartabone became involved with social work as secretary of the Jong Gorontalo in Surabaya in 1923. Five years later, he became chairman of the Gorontalo branch of the Indonesian National Party (PNI). He declared "Indonesia's independence" on 23 January 1942, three years before the proclamation of Indonesian independence on 17 August 1945. After independence, he was part of the forces which ended the Permesta revolt of several army officers in 1958.
