= 2024 Gorontalo gubernatorial election =

- 27 November 2024
- Turnout: 80.05% (▼0.26pp)
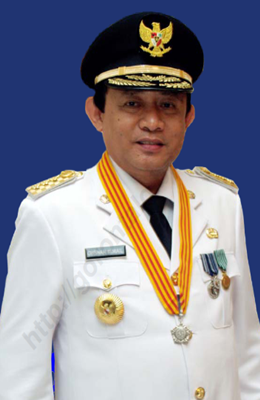

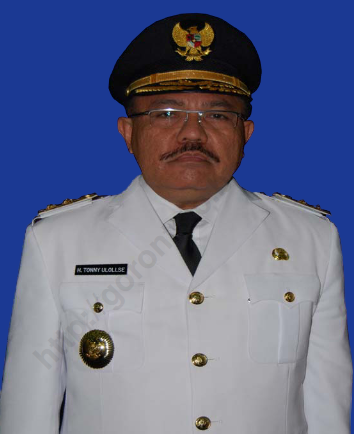

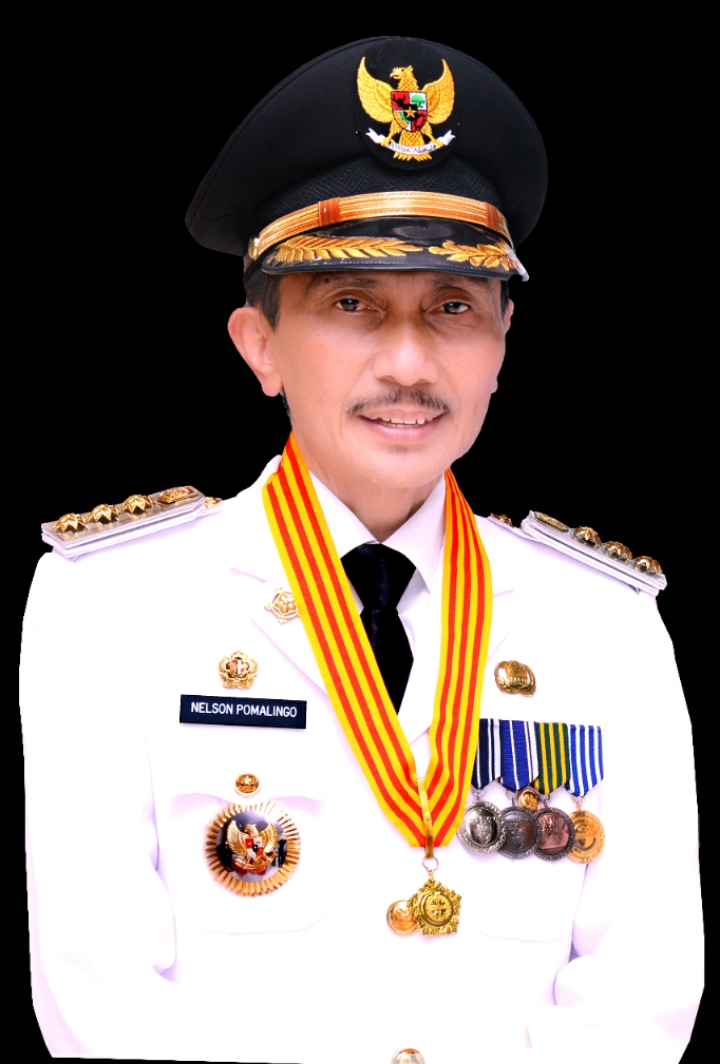
Candidate	Gusnar Ismail	Tonny Uloli
Party	Demokrat	NasDem
Alliance	KIM Plus	–
Running mate	Idah Syahidah Rusli Habibie	Marten Taha
Popular vote	295,893	193,222
Percentage	43.40%	28.33%
Candidate	Nelson Pomalingo	Hamzah Isa
Party	PPP	PDI-P
Running mate	Kris Wartabone	Abdurrahman Abubakar Bahmid
Popular vote	104,050	88,794
Percentage	15.26%	13.02%
- Results by district
Governor before election
M. Rudy Salahuddin (acting)
Independent
Elected Governor
Gusnar Ismail
Demokrat

The 2024 Gorontalo gubernatorial election was held on 27 November 2024 as part of nationwide local elections to elect the governor and vice governor of Gorontalo, Indonesia for a five-year term. The previous election was held in 2017. The election was won by Gusnar Ismail of the Democratic Party with 43% of the vote. Former Vice Governor Tonny Uloli of the NasDem Party placed second and received 28%.

== Electoral system ==
The election, like other local elections in 2024, follow the first-past-the-post system where the candidate with the most votes wins the election, even if they do not win a majority. It is possible for a candidate to run uncontested, in which case the candidate is still required to win a majority of votes "against" an "empty box" option. Should the candidate fail to do so, the election will be repeated on a later date.

The previous elected governor, Rusli Habibie, had served two full terms (2012–2022) and was ineligible to run in the election.

== Candidates ==
According to electoral regulations, in order to qualify for the election, candidates were required to secure support from a political party or a coalition of parties controlling 9 seats (20 percent of all seats) in the Gorontalo Regional House of Representatives (DPRD). Golkar, with 9 seats from the 2024 legislative election, is the only party eligible to nominate a candidate without forming a coalition with other parties. However, following a Constitutional Court of Indonesia decision in August 2024, the political support required to nominate a candidate was lowered to between 6.5 and 10 percent of the popular vote. Candidates may alternatively demonstrate support to run as an independent in form of photocopies of identity cards, which in Gorontalo's case corresponds to 88,121 copies. No independent candidates registered with the General Elections Commission (KPU) prior to the set deadline.

=== Potential ===
The following are individuals who have either been publicly mentioned as a potential candidate by a political party in the DPRD, publicly declared their candidacy with press coverage, or considered as a potential candidate by media outlets:

- Tonny Uloli (Golkar), former vice governor (2010–2012).
- Nelson Pomalingo (PPP), two-term regent of Gorontalo Regency.
- Rachmad Gobel (NasDem), deputy speaker of the House of Representatives, former Minister of Trade (2014–2019).
- Mujahidin Harpin Ondeh, former Indonesian Air Force air vice-marshal.

== Political map ==
Following the 2024 Indonesian legislative election, ten political parties are represented in the Gorontalo DPRD:

Political parties	Seat count
Party of Functional Groups (Golkar)	8 / 45
Indonesian Democratic Party of Struggle (PDI-P)	7 / 45
NasDem Party	7 / 45
Great Indonesia Movement Party (Gerindra)	6 / 45
Prosperous Justice Party (PKS)	5 / 45
United Development Party (PPP)	4 / 45
Democratic Party (Demokrat)	3 / 45
National Mandate Party (PAN)	3 / 45
National Awakening Party (PKB)	1 / 45
People's Conscience Party (Hanura)	1 / 45

== Results ==
Candidate	Running mate	Party	Votes	%
Gusnar Ismail	Idah Syahidah Rusli Habibie	Democratic Party	295,983	43.40
Tonny Uloli	Marten Taha	NasDem Party	193,222	28.33
Nelson Pomalingo	Kris Wartabone	United Development Party	104,050	15.26
Hamzah Isa	Abdurrahman Abubakar Bahmid	Indonesian Democratic Party of Struggle	88,794	13.02
Total			682,049	100.00
Valid votes			682,049	96.38
Invalid/blank votes			25,613	3.62
Total votes			707,662	100.00
Registered voters/turnout			884,080	80.05
Source: KPU

Candidate vote share by district
Tonny–Marten

Nelson–Kris

Hamzah–Bahmid

Gusnar–Idah
