= Mohi (name) =

Mohi is both a given name and a surname. In the Māori language, it is a transliteration of the name Moses. Notable people with the name include:

== Given name ==
- Mohi Baha'ud-din (born 1970), Hindustani musician
- Mohi Uddin Shamim (born 1970), Bangladeshi judge
- Mohi Sobhani, Iranian-American engineer and hostage during the Iran hostage crisis
- Hōne Mohi Tāwhai (c. 1827–1894), New Zealand politician
- Mohi Te Ātahīkoia (died 1928), New Zealand tribal leader
- Mohi Tūrei (c. 1829–1914), New Zealand tribal leader and religious minister

== Surname ==
- Elnino Mohi (born 1974), Indonesian politician
- Hinewehi Mohi (born 1964), New Zealand musician and producer
- Mita Mohi (1939–2016), New Zealand rugby league player
- Samiu Mohi (born c. 1962), Tongan rugby union player
- Vasdev Mohi (1944–2021), Sindhi poet and writer
- Zoltán Mohi (born 1967), Hungarian water polo player

== See also ==
- Mohi Bullar
- Mohi
