= Rusli Habibie =

Indonesian politician

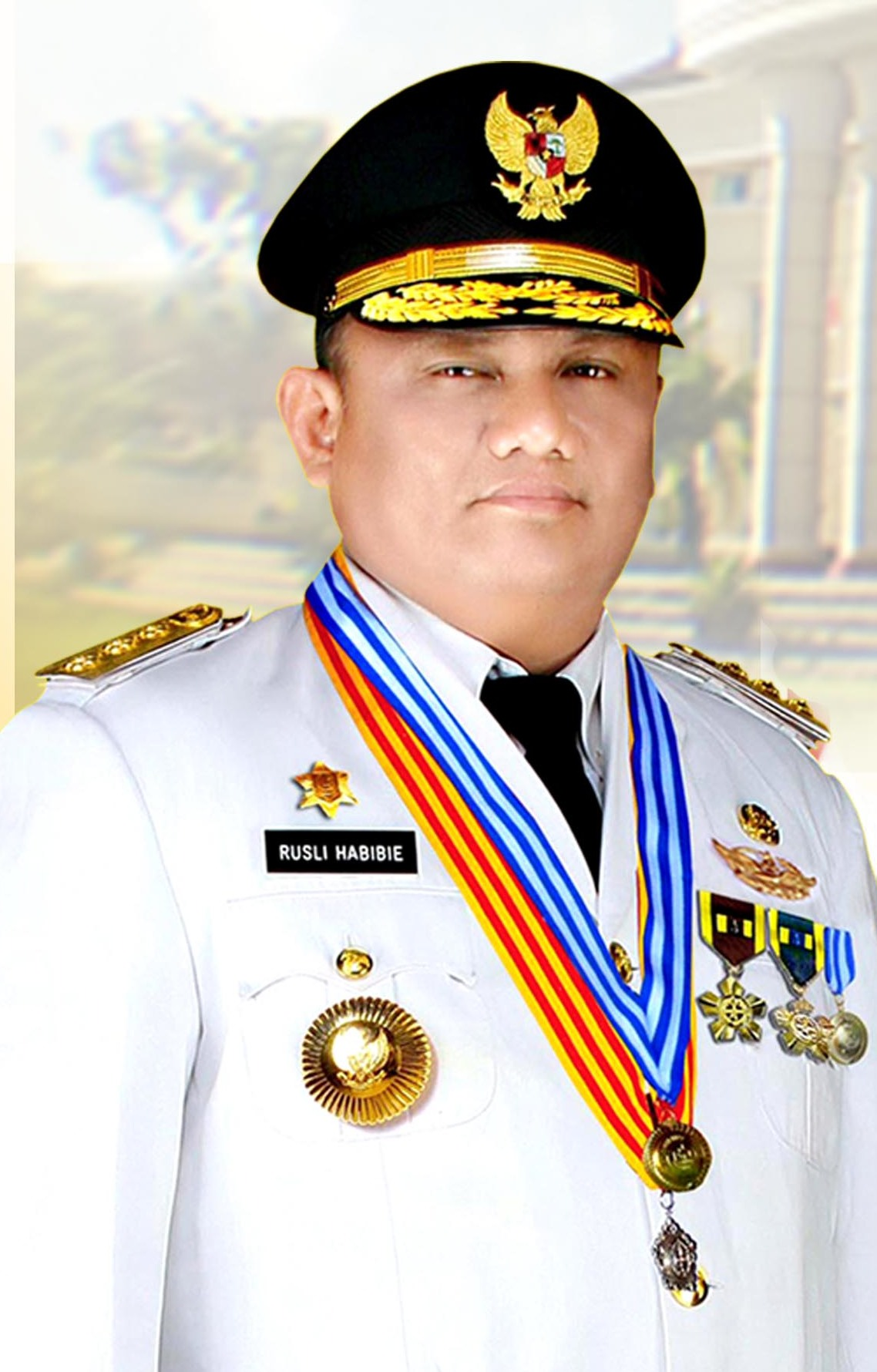
- Rusli Habibie in 2014

Member of the House of Representatives
- Incumbent
- Assumed office 1 October 2024
- Vote count: 95.379 votes (2024)
- Parliamentary group: Golkar faction
- Constituency: Gorontalo

Governor of Gorontalo
- In office 12 Mei 2017 – 12 Mei 2022
- Deputy: Idris Rahim
- Preceded by: Zudan Arif Fakrulloh (acting)
- Succeeded by: Hamka Hendra Noer (acting); Ismail Pakaya (acting); Mohammad Rudy Salahuddin (acting); Gusnar Ismail
- In office 16 January 2012 – 16 January 2017
- Deputy: Idris Rahim
- Preceded by: Gusnar Ismail
- Succeeded by: Zudan Arif Fakrulloh (acting)

Regent of North Gorontalo
- In office 6 December 2008 – 16 January 2012
- Governor: Fadel Muhammad; Gusnar Ismail
- Deputy: Indra Yasin
- Preceded by: Hamdan Datunsolang (Acting)
- Succeeded by: Indra Yasin

Personal details
- Born: 6 June 1963 (age 62) North Gorontalo Regency, Gorontalo, Indonesia
- Citizenship: Indonesian
- Party: Golkar
- Spouse(s): Idah Syahidah Rusli Habibie; Merry Kartika Koniyo
- Relations: B.J. Habibie (uncle)
- Children: 4
- Parents: Hamzah Habibie (father); Rahima Sidiki (mother)

Rusli Habibie is an Indonesian politician and former governor of Gorontalo. He is nephew of the third president and seventh vice president of Indonesia, B. J. Habibie.

Habibie's election was significant due to questions over his legal eligibility. He had previously been convicted of defamation of the province's former police chief and was still on probation at the time of the election.

Habibie requested that if schoolteachers smoke on school grounds, then people should send him photos of the offender via WhatsApp so he can reassign them to schools in more remote areas of the province as punishment.
