= Mohi =

Mohi may refer to:

- Mohi (name), name list
- Muhi or Mohi, a village in eastern Hungary
- Battle of Mohi, a 1241 battle between the Mongol Empire and the Kingdom of Hungary, named for the village it took place near
- Medal of Honor: Infiltrator, a 2003 game for the Game Boy Advance
- Mohi (TV series), an Indian soap opera
- Mattha, aka "Mohi", a spice beverage
- Mohi (Ludhiana West), Punjab, India
