= Saronde Island =

Island in Gorontalo, Indonesia

- List of beaches in Indonesia
- Saronde Island
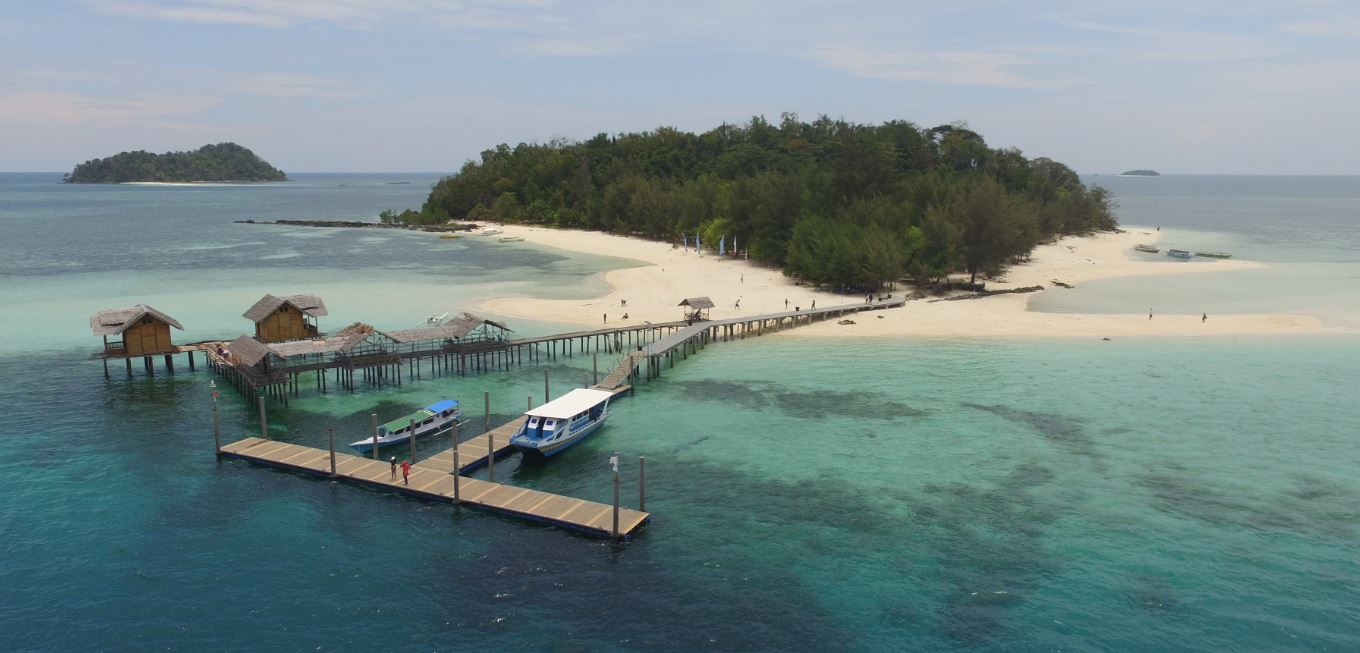
- Clockwise, from top left : Saronde Island from above, White beach, Flower in Saronde, Cruiser Visit

- Seal
- Interactive map of Saronde Island
- Coordinates: 0°55′N 122°51′E
- Country: Indonesia
- Province: Gorontalo
- Website: www.sarondeislands.com

Saronde Island is an island in the Celebes Sea, within the Ponelo Islands District (Ponelo Kepulauan) of North Gorontalo Regency, in Gorontalo Province, Indonesia.

== Location ==
Saronde Island lies on North Gorontalo Regency - Northern part of Gorontalo Province - Indonesia, or 400 km west side Manado City - Indonesia. This island can be reach in 40 minutes from Gorontalo Airport, or 120 minutes from Gorontalo City. Saronde Island is known for its large white sandy beach, and its calm water.

== Natural Life ==
The island has an area of 8 hectares, 20% of which consists of flat sandy land, the rest consists of hill and forest. Thousands of birds use Saronde's forest as their home. Hundreds of pied imperial pigeon (Ducula bicolor) nest in Saronde's top hill forest. At the northern part of Saronde, we can find a vast array of ancient basalt stone... probably constructed when there were a giant earthquake thousands years ago that formed this island.

The underwater life in Saronde is quite rich. All the corals and marine life have a similarity with Bunaken National Park in Manado. There are whale shark (Rhincodon typus) appearances once in a while. Other interesting animals like sperm whale (Physeter macrocephalus), dugong (Dugong dugon), and large stingray (Dasyatis pastinaca) were reported hanging around Saronde island by local fisherman. Cassis cornuta also appears frequently in large amounts along Bogisa beach, 300 m on northern Saronde Island.

School of fish

Underwater view

Coral reef near Saronde

Turtle Conservation

== Tourism ==
Saronde Island right now is one of the most popular tourism spots in Gorontalo Province. More than 16,000 tourists visited this island in 2016, of which more than 1,000 were foreigners. Most of the tourists had a single-day visiting activity, but some of them were staying in one of 9 cottages built on the island. For business gathering, this island had a small meeting room to accept 40-60 guests.

Cottage

Floating dock

Restaurant

From far away

== Island hopping ==
There are three other islands around Saronde, namely Bogisa, Mohinggito and Lampu island. Bogisa Island (9 hectares) has an elongated white sand beach, hills and forest with Saronde-like vegetation. Mohinggito Island (30 hectares) is a marine conservation area that has a wide bay and is commonly used as a conscious mooring place for yachts visiting Saronde. Lampu Island (6 hectares) has a white sand beaches like Saronde. This island has flare lights and a government guardhouse. These islands are commonly visited by tourists and have become a package with Saronde tour visits.
