= Gusnar Ismail =

Indonesian politician (born 1959)

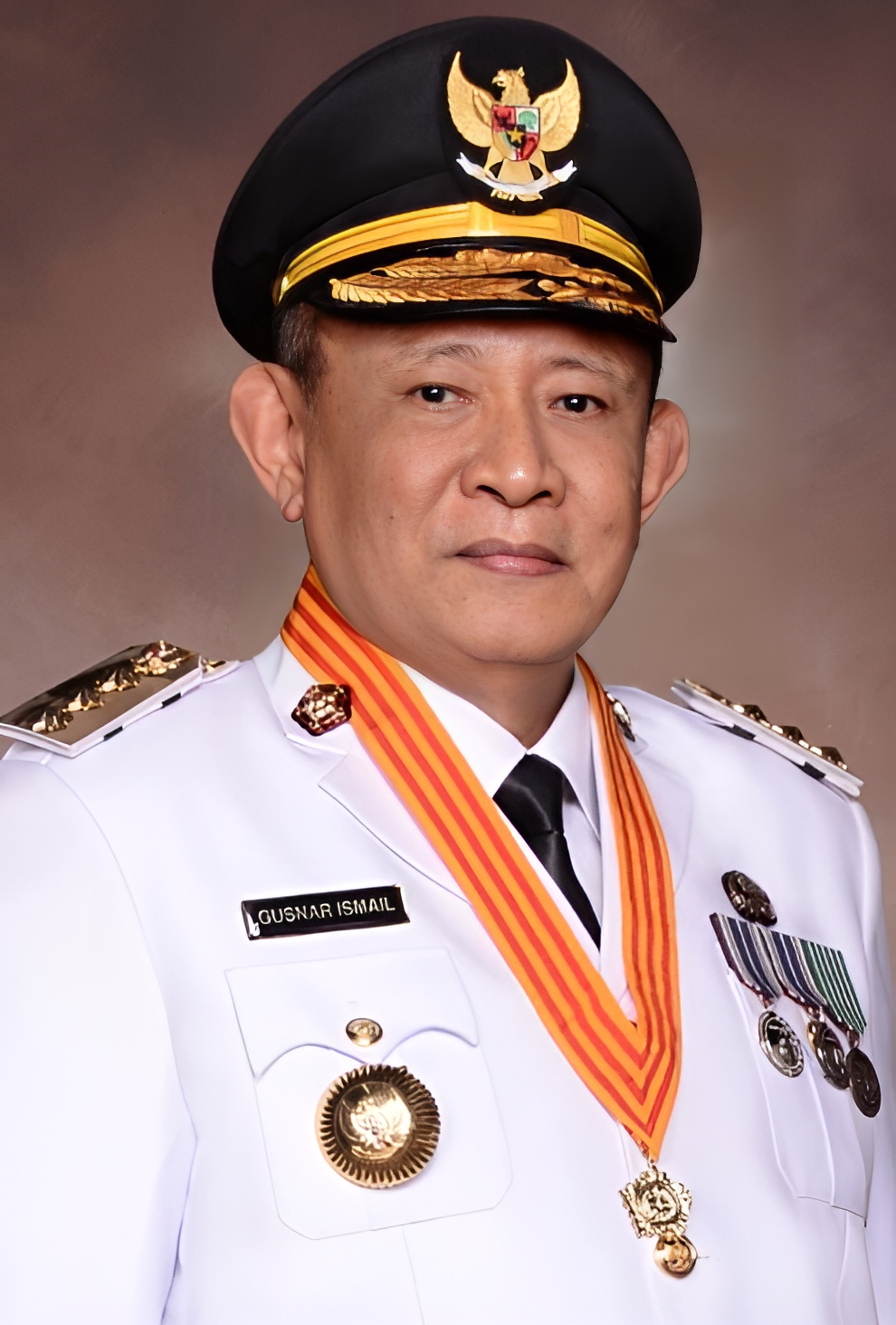
- Official portrait, 2025

Governor of Gorontalo
- Incumbent
- Assumed office 20 February 2025
- Preceded by: Rusli Habibie; M. Rudy Salahuddin (act.)
- In office 29 December 2009 – 16 January 2012
- Preceded by: Fadel Muhammad
- Succeeded by: Rusli Habibie

Vice Governor of Gorontalo
- In office 12 September 2001 – 29 December 2009
- Preceded by: Position created
- Succeeded by: Tonny Uloli

Personal details
- Born: 12 December 1959 (age 66) Gorontalo, Indonesia
- Party: Demokrat (since 2011)
- Other political affiliations: Golkar (1993–1997)

Gusnar Ismail (born 12 December 1959) is an Indonesian politician and former civil servant who is the incumbent governor of Gorontalo, Indonesia, serving since February 2025. He had previously held the position between 2009 and 2012, and was previously Vice Governor of Gorontalo between 2001 and 2009.

== Early life ==
Gusnar Ismail was born on 12 December 1959 in the city of Gorontalo, then part of the province of Sulawesi. Both his parents worked in healthcare, with his father being a healthcare officer and his mother being a hospital nurse. Due to his father's work, the family briefly relocated while Ismail was in elementary school from Gorontalo city to Limboto. At Limboto, Ismail completed elementary and middle schools, before returning to Gorontalo city to complete high school. In 1985, he began studying a degree in agricultural science at Sam Ratulangi University in Manado, and after receiving his bachelor's there he would later receive a master's in management (2001) from an economic institute in Jakarta and a doctorate from Sunan Kalijaga State Islamic University in Yogyakarta.

== Career ==
Ismail began to work as a civil servant. Initially, he worked as part of the North Sulawesi provincial government before moving to Gorontalo's municipal government in 1990. Due to his civil servant work, he was part of the Golkar party, and by 2000 he was Regional Secretary for Gorontalo City. In 2001, he was elected by the legislature of the newly-formed Gorontalo province to become vice governor under Fadel Muhammad. The pair was reelected for a second term in the 2006 direct gubernatorial election.

=== As governor ===
In 2009, Fadel Muhammad was appointed as Minister of Fisheries and Maritime Affairs, and resigned from his governorship. After a delay, Ismail was sworn in as governor of Gorontalo to replace him on 29 December 2009. After the ceremony, Ismail noted that his governorship would have "almost no changes in program" to Fadel's prior term. Tonny Uloli replaced Ismail as vice governor.

In 2011, he ran for a second term with Uloli as running mate, but placed second in a three-way contest after winning 183,060 votes (37%), behind Rusli Habibie's 264,011 votes (53.3%). A lawsuit filed to the Constitutional Court of Indonesia was rejected, and Habibie was sworn in to replace Ismail on 16 January 2012. Three days prior to the end of his term, Ismail swore in a new Regional Secretary for the province, resulting in a protest.

After his first term, Ismail ran for a seat in the House of Representatives in the 2014 legislative election as a Demokrat candidate, winning around 48 thousand votes but failing to secure a seat. He also became the provincial chairman of Demokrat in Gorontalo. He ran again in 2019, again failing to win a seat.

Ismail made a second attempt to run as governor in the 2024 gubernatorial election, securing the support of Demokrat, Golkar, Gerindra, and PBB. As his running mate was Idah Syahidah, 2019–2024 House of Representatives member and wife of 2012–2022 governor Rusli Habibie. The election was a four-way race, and Ismail–Idah came out on top after securing 295,983 votes (43.4%). Ismail was sworn in as governor on 20 February 2025.

== Personal life ==
He is married to Nani Mokodongan, and the couple has three children. One of their sons, Erwin Ismail, had been elected twice into Gorontalo's provincial DPRD, and headed Gusnar's gubernatorial campaign team in 2024.
