= Suwawa =

District of Bone Bolango Regency, Gorontalo, Indonesia

Coordinates: 0°33′N 123°12′E

Suwawa is a district (kecamatan) and capital district of Bone Bolango Regency, Gorontalo, Indonesia, also known as Tuwawa. The later name Tuwawa coming from a kingdom, said to have formed in the 4th century. However, the Kingdom is known around the 8th century.

The name "Suwawa" or "Tuwawa" comes from the word Tuwawa'a (Language of Suwawa) or Tuwawu (Language of Gorontalo), which means one. Essentially the word Towawa'a means "one body". It's also known as a social union by genealogy, territorial, and cultural communities that integrated by family, region and culture.
