= Kwandang =

Town in Gorontalo, Indonesia

Coordinates: 0.8275°S 122.9189°E

Kwandang (Gorontalo: Uwanengo or Tomilito) is a district and town in Indonesia and the regency seat of the Regency of North Gorontalo. This district is divided into 18 villages.

According to history, the first people to come and live on the Kwandang coast were the Buol people, then the Gorontalo people who came from the Limboto Kingdom. The entry of the Gorontalo people from Limboto was driven by their fear that Tomilito (Kwandang) would be controlled by the Buol Kingdom. At that time, the coastal waters of Kwandang were in a state of war against Maguindanao people, a gang of pirates from the island of Mindanao.
