= Tilamuta =

Coordinates: 0°32′N 122°21′E

Tilamuta is a town in Sulawesi in Indonesia and is the seat of the Regency of Boalemo.
