= Gorontalo =

Province in Sulawesi, Indonesia

- Province
- Province of Gorontalo; Provinsi Gorontalo
- Coat of arms
- Nickname: Bumi Serambi Madinah; Porch of Medina
- Motto(s): Adati Hula Hula'a To Syara', Syara' Hula Hula'a To Quru'ani (Gorontalo); Tradition rooted in the Sharia, the Sharia rooted in the Quran
- Gorontalo in Indonesia
- Interactive map of Gorontalo
- Coordinates: 0°40′N 123°00′E
- Country: Indonesia
- Region: Sulawesi (Eastern Indonesia)
- Founded: 5 December 2000
- Capital and largest city: Gorontalo

Government
  - Body: Gorontalo Provincial Government
  - Governor: Gusnar Ismail (Democratic)
  - Vice Governor: Idah Syahidah Rusli Habibie
  - Legislature: Gorontalo Regional House of Representatives (DPRD)

Area
  - Total: 12,024.98 km^{2} (4,642.87 sq mi)
  - Rank: 33rd in Indonesia
- Highest elevation (Huidu Tentolomatinan): 2,211 m (7,254 ft)

Population (mid 2025 estimate)
  - Total: 1,242,240
  - Density: 103.305/km^{2} (267.559/sq mi)

Demographics
  - Ethnic groups: 90% Gorontaloan; 10% others
  - Religion (2017): 96.7% Islam; 2.19% Protestantism; 0.69% Catholicism; 0.38% Hinduism; 0.08% Buddhism
  - Languages: Indonesian (official); Gorontalo Malay (lingua franca); Gorontalo, Bolango, Suwawa (regional)
- Time zone: UTC+08 (Indonesia Central Time)
- ISO 3166 code: ID-GO
- HDI (2024): ▲0.720 (29th) – high
- Website: www.gorontaloprov.go.id

Gorontalo (Gorontaloan: Hulontalo) is a province of Indonesia on the island of Sulawesi. Located on the Minahasa Peninsula, Gorontalo was formerly part of the province of North Sulawesi until its inauguration as a separate province on 5 December 2000. The province is bordered by the provinces of North Sulawesi to the east and Central Sulawesi to the west, as well sharing a maritime border with the Philippines in the Sulawesi Sea to the north, and a coastline on the Gulf of Tomini to the south. The provincial capital, as well as the main gateway to the province and its most populated city, is Gorontalo (also often called Hulontalo). The size is comparable to Vanuatu or the Russian republic of Kabardino-Balkaria.

The province covers a total land area of 12,024.98 square kilometres (4,642.87 sq mi) and had a population of 1,040,164 at the 2010 Census, and 1,171,681 at the 2020 Census; the official estimate as at mid 2025 was 1,242,240 (comprising 626,060 males and 616,180 females), resulting in a population density of 103.3 inhabitants per square kilometre (268/sq mi).

The province is known by the nicknames "Porch of Medina" (Indonesian: Bumi Serambi Madinah), an allusion to the cradle of Islamic civilisation used because the pre-colonial kingdoms of Gorontalo applied Islamic law as a basis for implementing the law, in the fields of government, society and the courts, and "Karawo Province" for the local karawo embroidery. The only Indonesian President to hail from the Gorontalo people was the third President of the Republic of Indonesia, Bacharuddin Jusuf Habibie. His father, Alwi Abdul Jalil Habibie, came from the Habibie clan.

== Etymology ==
The word Gorontalo comes from the word Hulontalo in the Gorontalo language. Hulontalo is derived from the word Hulontalangi, a name of one of the Kingdoms in Gorontalo. In addition, there are several historical records regarding the origin of the name Gorontalo, including:

1. Gorontalo comes from the word "Hulontalangi", which means "Valley of the Noble". Hulontalangi comes from two syllables, namely "Huluntu" which means "Valley" and "Langi" which means "Noble".
2. Gorontalo comes from the word "Hulontalangi", which means "Inundated Land". The word "Hulontalangi" in other translations comes from two syllables, namely "Huntu" which means "Piles of Soils" or "Mainland", and "Langi-Langi" which means "Flooded". Then the word "Hulontalangi" can also be interpreted as "Flooded Land" according to the story of the people of Gorontalo.
3. Gorontalo comes from the word "Huidu Totolu", which means "Three Mountains". If traced its history, there are three ancient mountains on the Gorontalo peninsula, namely Mount Malenggalila, Mount Tilonggabila (changed to Tilongkabila) and another Mountain which is not named.
4. Gorontalo comes from the word "Pogulatalo", which means "Place of Waiting". The word "Pogulatalo" gradually changed in the words of the community to "Hulatalo"
5. Gorontalo comes from the word "Hulontalo". However, due to difficulties in pronunciation, the Dutch colonizers referred to "Hulontalo" as "Gorontalo".

Gorontalo people sometime refer themselves as Hulandalo or Hulantalo, a well-known term in Gorontalo and North Sulawesi, which usually refers to the region of Gorontalo or the native people from Gorontalo.

== History ==
Historically, Gorontalo has been the centre for the spread of Islam in Eastern Indonesia, dating back to the pre-colonial era. The province also was the seat of many independent Gorontaloan kingdoms. The Dutch arrived in the beginning of the 17th century, subjugating the local kingdoms and finally annexed the area into the Dutch East Indies. Gorontalo was briefly occupied by the Japanese during World War II, before finally becoming part of the independent Republic of Indonesia.

Gorontalo was incorporated into the province of North Sulawesi, but after the Fall of Suharto, the government decided to create a new province, owing to the cultural and religious differences to the Christian-majority province of North Sulawesi and also as part of the country's decentralization program. Hence, the new province was created on 5 December 2000.

Compared to other provinces of Indonesia, Gorontalo is one of the least developed provinces. As of 2017, Gorontalo scores 0.670 in Human Development Index, one of the lowest in Indonesia. It ranks 28th out of the 34 provinces. Compared to the neighbouring provinces such as North Sulawesi, Gorontalo's infrastructure is very poorly developed. The province has often suffered from electricity crises as well as water shortages. Nevertheless, the government is currently attempting to improve Gorontalo's infrastructure, with construction projects such as the Gorontalo Outer Ring Road, Randangan Dam and the Anggrek Power Plant.

=== Pre-Colonial era ===
The peninsula which includes Gorontalo has had some type of human civilization since approximately 1300 years ago. Historical records show a Kingdom of Suwawa as existing in 8th century AD. This is reinforced by the discovery of the tomb of their king, Moluadu, on the banks of the river Bulawa along with his wife and child.

However, Gorontalo Peninsula did not just have historical records on the inscription King ancient tombs, but it also has prehistoric sites. Oluhuta sites, is a prehistoric site and has a prehistoric tomb in it. This may be evidence that Gorontalo has had a very ancient civilization.

Meanwhile, the city of Gorontalo is one of the oldest cities on Sulawesi, in addition to the cities of Makassar and Manado. It is estimated that Gorontalo has been around since approximately 400 years ago or around the 1500s in the 16th century. Previously Gorontalo City became one of the centers of Islamic religion in Eastern Indonesia, in addition to Ternate (now part of North Maluku Province).

Along with the spread of the religion, Gorontalo city eventually became the centre of education and commerce for the surrounding regions such as Bolaang Mongondow (North Sulawesi), Buol, Luwuk, Banggai, Donggala (Central Sulawesi) and even further towards Southeast Sulawesi. This is because of its strategic location, its position facing directly into the Gulf of Tomini (south) and the Sulawesi Sea (north).

Before the colonial period Gorontalo was governed under customary law. The kingdoms were united in a bond of kinship called "Pohala'a". According to Haga (1931) there were five pohala'a Gorontalo area:

- Pohala'a Gorontalo
- Pohala'a Limboto
- Pohala'a Suwawa
- Pohala'a Bolango, later Pohala'a Boalemo
- Pohala'a Atinggola

Based on the classification made by Mr. C. Vollenhoven, the Gorontalo peninsula was included among the 19 indigenous areas in Indonesia. Religion and customs in Gorontalo were fused with the term "Adat bersendikan Syara 'and Syara' bersendikan Kitabullah". Pohala'a Gorontalo is the most prominent among the five Pohalaa. That is why Gorontalo is more widely known.

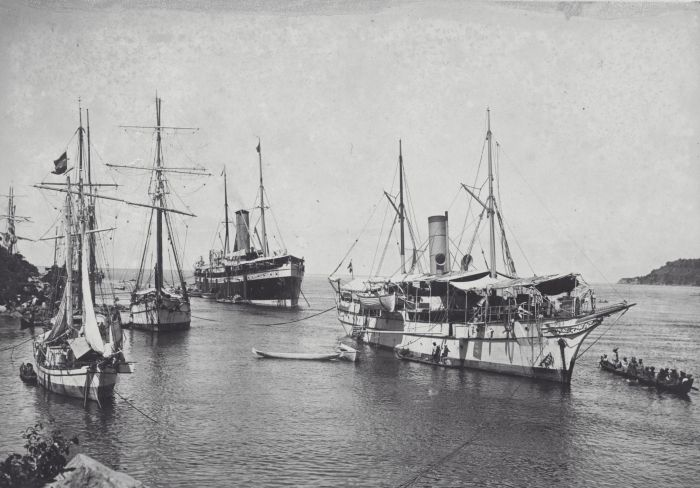
Dutch ships in Gorontalo. Gorontalo was an important trading hub during the colonial era.

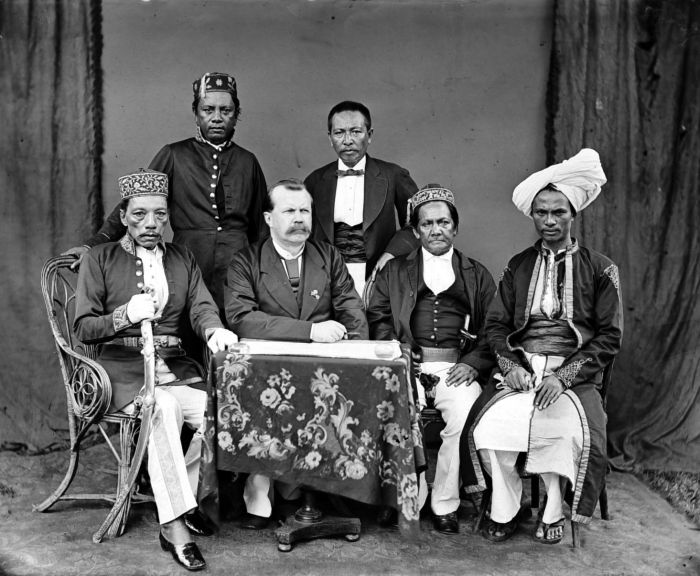
Gorontaloan nobles and the Dutch deputy regent of Gorontalo. The Dutch ruled Gorontalo for almost three centuries.

=== Colonial era ===
Europeans began arriving in the Indonesian archipelago starting in the 16th century because of interest in spices from Indonesia, especially spices from the Maluku islands. The first Westerners to come to Indonesia were the Portuguese, who sailed from Malacca to Gresik in East Java and then to the Moluccas, where spices were collected. Then followed the Spaniards, who arrived in 1521 with two ships through the Philippines, Borneo, Tidore, Bacan, and Jailolo, until they sailed to Maluku until 1534.

Then the Dutch came to Indonesia and arrived in Banten in 1596, which was also a place for trading spices from the surrounding area. In 1607, the Dutch visited the Minahasa Peninsula, with the approval of the Sultan of Ternate. As the peninsula at that time was part of the Sultanate of Ternate, the Dutch were assigned by the Sultan to order all Ternate people who were in Manado to return to Ternate. This was done to make it easier for the Dutch to repulse Spain in Manado who came to North Sulawesi through the Philippines. In 1617, the Spaniards tried to spread Catholicism to the local people around Lake Tondano by force, but they were repulsed by the local community. The local chief requested the Dutch for help, and the Spaniards was repulsed from the area.

Since then, in North Sulawesi, the Dutch began to establish its hegemony, then after the Dutch East India Company (VOC) governor in Ternate, Robertus Padtbrugge, traveled across North Sulawesi to Kwandang to make a contractual decision in 1678. The Gorontaloan and Limbotoan localities could do nothing when the Ternate Sultanate handed over Gorontalo and Limboto regions to the VOC.

Gorontalo was important to the VOC because it contained food ingredients such as rice, chocolate and coconut, besides that in the mountains there are also gold mines, such as in the areas of Samalata, Marisa, Bonepantai, and Bintauna. Seeing these conditions, the VOC established a trading post, through which the trade offices between the Dutch government and Gorontaloan kingdoms were officially started.

Subsequent developments, the political transition of the VOC to the Dutch East Indies at the turn of the 18th century to the 19th century was marked by VOC bankruptcy caused by various factors, such as accounting fraud, corruption, weak employee capabilities, monopoly systems, and systems forced which brought about the moral deterioration of the rulers and the suffering of the population.

Entering the 19th century as the transition of the government process of centralization of government administration from the central level to the village level was inevitable for the Dutch colonies, especially Gorontalo.

=== Japanese Occupation and Independence ===
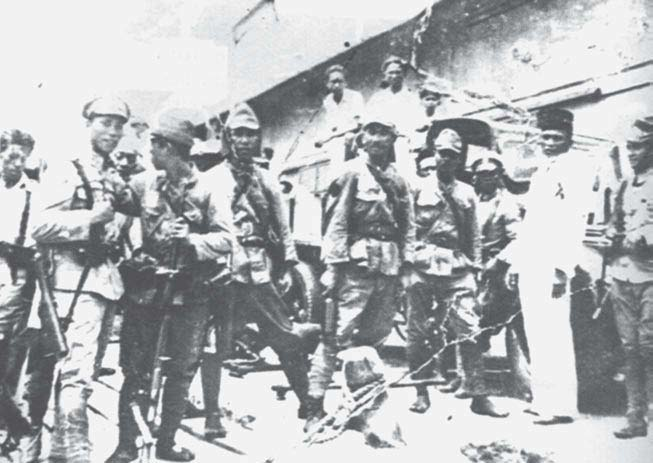
Nani Wartabone (second from right) meeting with Japanese troops after taking over power in Gorontalo from the Dutch.

The Japanese occupied Gorontalo during World War II, ending three centuries of Dutch colonial rule. Gorontalo was subjected to air bombing as well as naval shelling by the Allies over the course of the war, resulting in severe civilian casualties.

Prior to the onset of Indonesian independence, Nani Wartabone headed a Gorontalan Independence Movement, declaring itself sovereign on 23 January 1942. For approximately two years Gorontalo was effectively a self-governing region. This was a milestone in the struggle for independence and inspired similar efforts both on Celebes and across the Indonesian archipelago. However, this was brutally opposed by the Japanese, and the Kenpeitai arrested and tortured many pro-Independence advocate, including Wartabone himself. Wartabone was eventually recognized by the Indonesian government as a National Hero of Indonesia. Today, he is buried in his hometown of Suwawa, in the eastern part of the province.

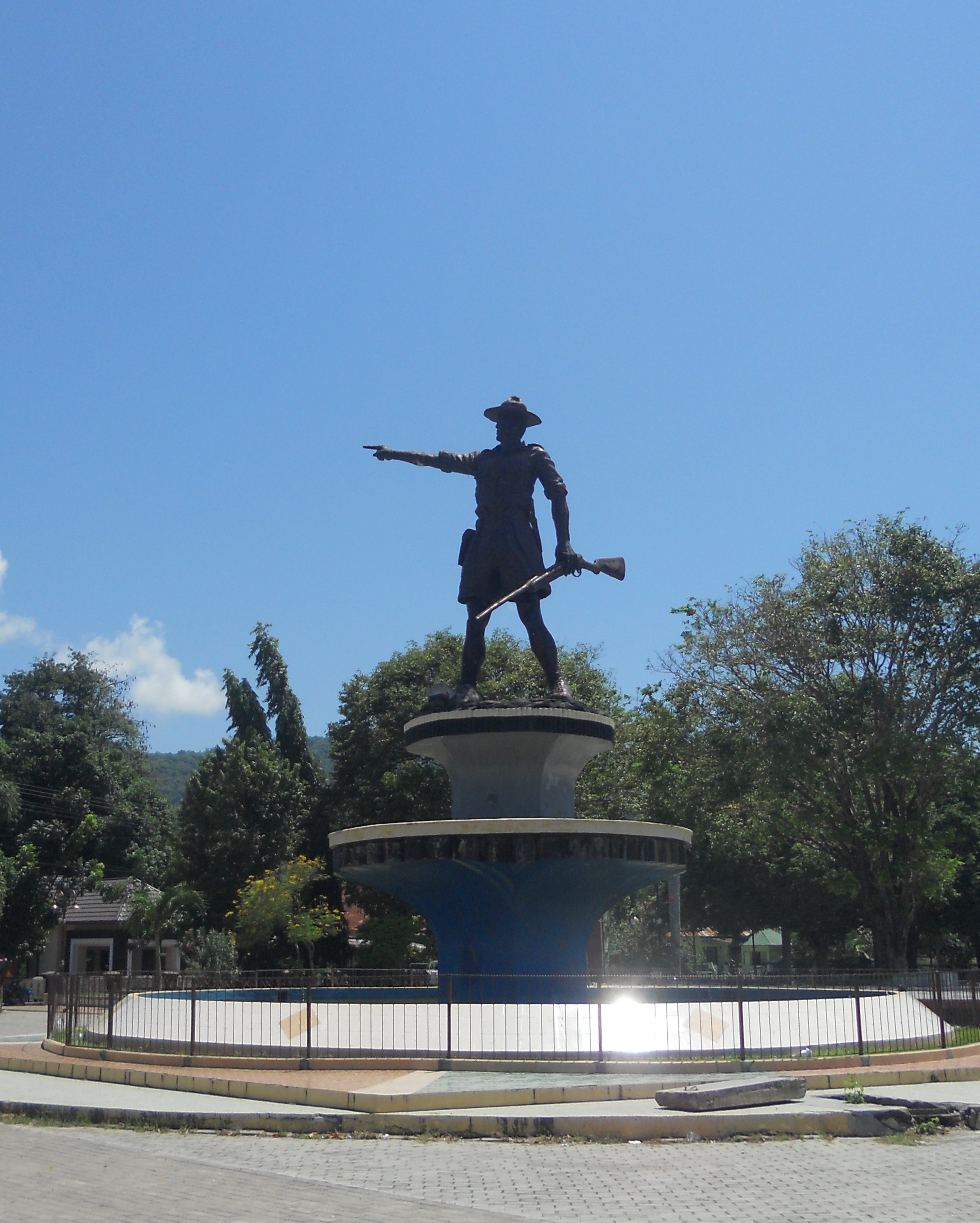
A monument of Nani Wartabone, a Gorontaloan national hero who resisted both the Dutch and the Japanese.

After the surrender of Japan in 1945, the Japanese handed the area to the local pro-Independence militia. However, the Dutch returned to Gorontalo to assume control, resulting in an inevitable war between the Dutch forces and the Indonesian Republicans. After the Linggadjati Agreement between the Dutch and the Indonesian, Gorontalo was incorporated into the State of East Indonesia, a state of the United States of Indonesia. In 1950, Gorontalo became part of the province of North Sulawesi in a now unitary Republic of Indonesia.

In 1957, chaos and lack of attention by the central government in Jakarta resulted in a rebellion by Permesta which was based in Manado, the capital of North Sulawesi. However, Gorontalo was not much affected by the rebellion, as the locals still supported the central government. The rebellion was crushed in 1960 after the government assaulted and captured Manado.

In 2000, Gorontalo City and two regencies, with their Muslim-majority communities, were spun off from North Sulawesi into a separate province with Gorontalo as the provincial seat.

== Geography ==
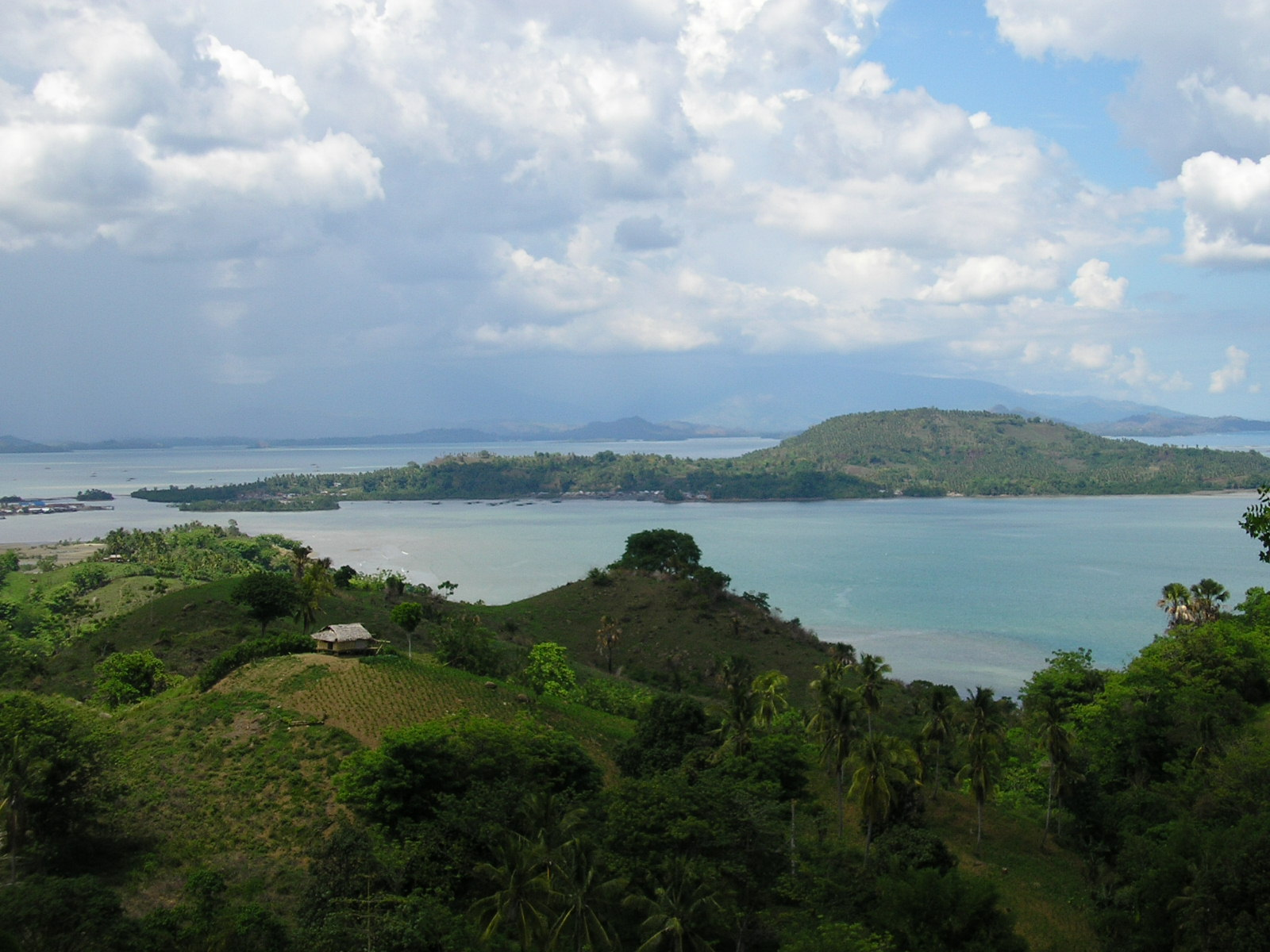
The Kwandang area.

Gorontalo lies on the northern peninsula of Sulawesi, also known as the Minahasa Peninsula. The province has an elongated shape area, stretching from west to east almost horizontally on a map, with a total area of 12,024.98 km^{2} (4,642.87 sq mi). To the north and the south of the province lies the Sulawesi Sea and the Gulf of Gorontalo or known as Gulf of Tomini, respectively. Prior to 2000, Gorontalo province was part of North Sulawesi province which lies on the eastern border. The western border of the province is Central Sulawesi province.

Topographically, the province is relatively low (0–40^{o}), with the elevation ranging between 0–2,400 m (7,900 ft) above sea level. Its coastline length is more than 590 km (370 mi). Counting the Exclusive Economic Zone to the north where Philippines is at the border, the total sea area of the province is more than 50,500 km^{2} (19,500 sq mi). There are some small islands around the north and the south of the province, 67 of which have been identified and named.

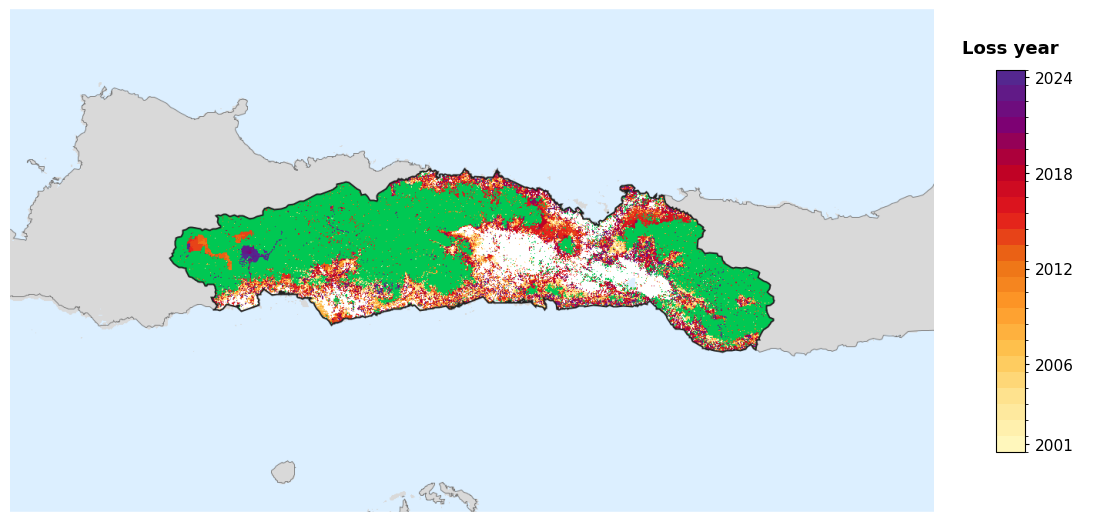
Tree-cover loss year in Gorontalo, 2001-2024, from the Global Forest Change dataset.

The land surface in Gorontalo Province is mostly hilly. Therefore, the province has many mountains with different heights. Tabongo Mountain which is located in Boalemo Regency is the highest mountain while Litu-Litu Mountain which is located in Gorontalo Regency is the lowest.

Besides having many mountains, Gorontalo Province is also crossed by many rivers. The longest river is the Paguyaman River located in Boelemo Regency with a flow length of 99.3 km. While the shortest river is the Bolontio River with a flow length of 5.3 km located in North Gorontalo Regency.

As the peninsula of which Gorontalo Province is a part is located near the equator, this area has a fairly high air temperature. The minimum temperature occurs in September which is 22.8 °C. While the maximum temperature occurs in October with a temperature of 33.5 °C. In 2013 the average temperature ranged from 26.2 °C to 27.6 °C.

Gorontalo Province has relatively high air humidity, the average humidity in 2013 reached 86.5% percent. Whereas the highest rainfall occurs in May, which is 307.9 mm but the highest number of rainy days is in July and December, which is 24 days.

== Politics ==
The governor (Indonesian: Gubernur) and vice-governor (Indonesian: Wakil Gubernur), who are elected directly by the people, head the provincial administration.

=== Government and administrative divisions ===
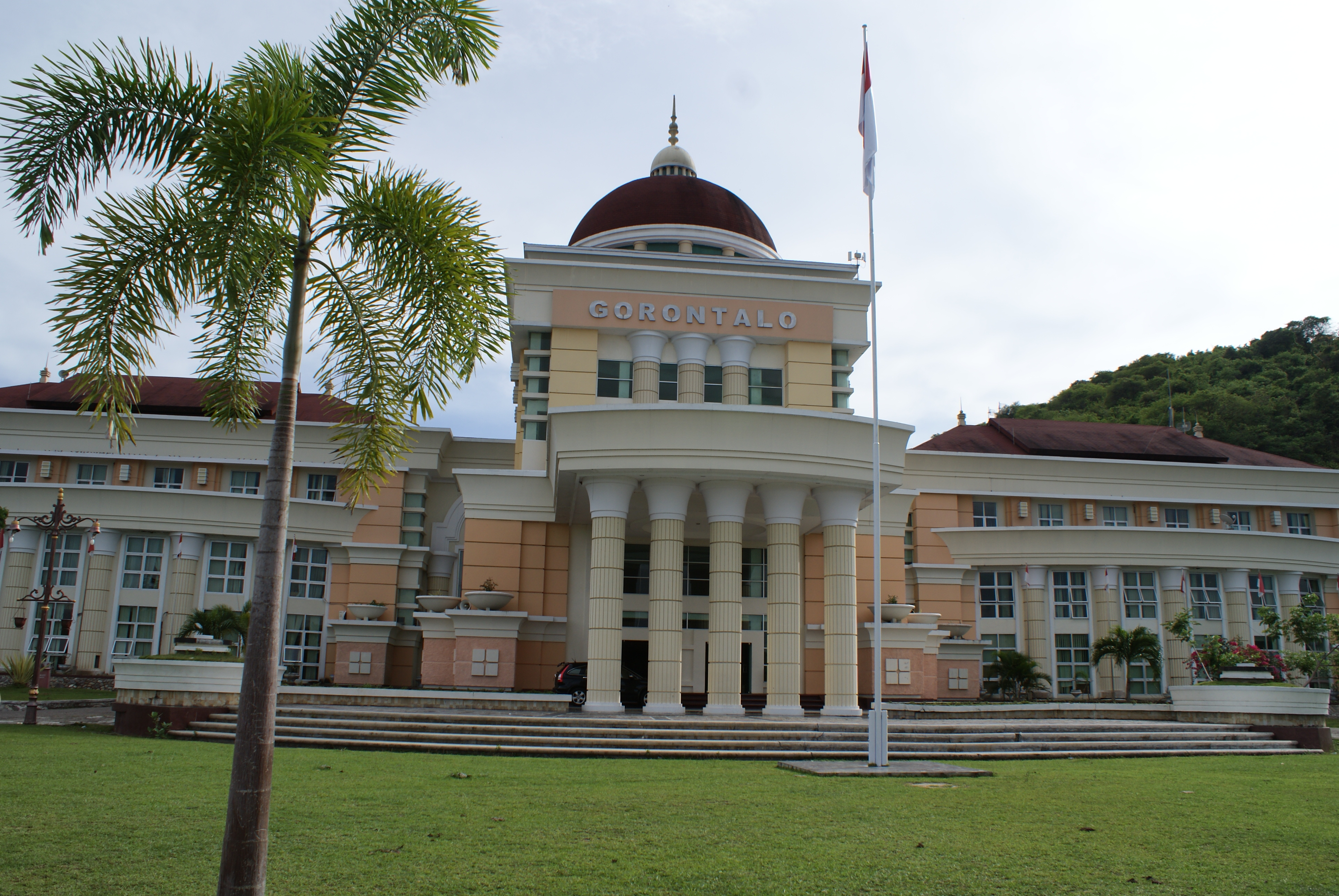
Governor's office of Gorontalo Province (2010).

The province is divided into five regencies (Indonesian: kabupaten) and only one city (Indonesian: kota). When the province was established in 2000, there were only two regencies (Gorontalo Regency and Boalemo Regency) and the city in the province. Splitting of regencies occurred on 25 February 2003 (when Pohuwato Regency was created from the western part of Boalemo Regency (itself only created on 4 October 1999 from the western part of Gorontalo Regency), and Bone Bolango Regency was created from the eastern part of Gorontalo Regency) and on 2 January 2007 (when North Gorontalo Regency was created from the northern part of Gorontalo Regency). In 2026, Gorontalo Province consisted of 77 districts (kecamatan) comprising 734 villages (rural desa and urban kelurahan).
As of 2024, the list of regencies and cities in Gorontalo province is given in the table below with their areas and their populations at the 2010 and 2020 censuses, together with the official estimates as at mid 2025.

Kode Wilayah	Name of City or Regency	Regency seat	Est.	Established by statute	Area in km^{2}	Pop'n census 2010	Pop'n census 2020	Pop'n estimate mid 2025	HDI 2014 estimate
75.02	Boalemo Regency	Tilamuta	1999	UU 50/1999	1,831.64	129,253	145,868	155,180	0.621 (Medium)
75.01	Gorontalo Regency	Limboto	1959	UU 29/1959	2,160.18	355,988	393,107	413,630	0.629 (Medium)
75.04	Pohuwato Regency	Marisa	2003	UU 6/2003	4,370.66	128,748	146,432	155,670	0.617 (Medium)
75.03	Bone Bolango Regency	Suwawa	2003	UU 6/2003	1,888.94	141,915	162,778	172,730	0.660 (Medium)
75.05	North Gorontalo Regency (Gorontalo Utara)	Kwandang	2007	UU 11/2007	1,702.75	104,133	124,957	134,850	0.619 (Medium)
75.71	Gorontalo City		1959	UU 50/1959	70.82	180,127	198,539	210,190	0.749 (High)

The province now forms one of Indonesia's 84 national electoral districts to elect members to the People's Representative Council. The Gorontalo Electoral District consists of all of the 5 regencies in the province, together with the city of Gorontalo, and elects 3 members to the People's Representative Council.

=== Gorontalo Regional People's Representative Council ===
The Gorontalo Regional People's Representative Council (Indonesian: Dewan Perwakilan Rakyat Daerah Gorontalo) is a regional people's representative institution that is domiciled as an organizer of the regional government of Gorontalo province. In the 2014 Indonesian legislative election, the Regional People's Representative Council placed 45 representatives spread from different political parties.

=== Representatives in the People's Representative Council and the Regional Representative Council ===
Based on the results of the 2014 election, Gorontalo has three representatives in the People's Representative Council and four in the Regional Representative Council. The three representatives in the People's Representative Council were Fadel Muhammad and Roem Kono from the Golkar Party and Elnino Mohi from the Gerindra Party, while the representatives in the Regional Representative Council were Hanah Hasanah Fadel Muhamad, Rahmijati Jahja, Abdurahman Abubakar Bachmid and Dewi Sartika Hemeto.

== Economy ==
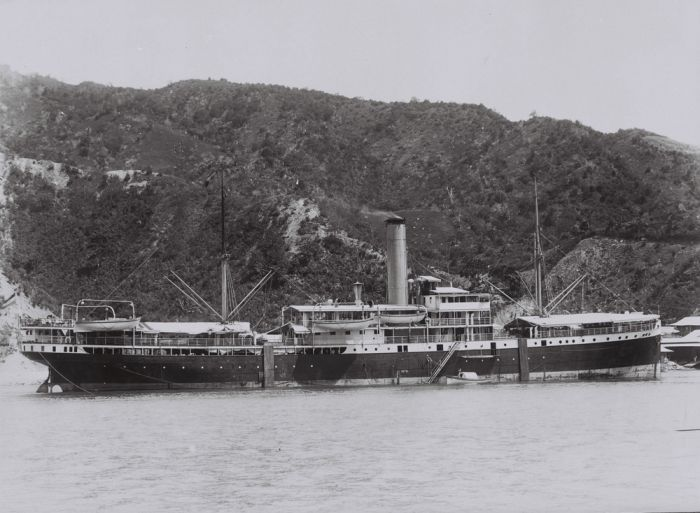
Dutch trading ships in the Port of Gorontalo. Gorontalo has become an important trading post since the ancient times.

Gorontalo is one of the busiest trade routes in Indonesia since ancient times. Gorontalo has a strategic geographic location for the national economy, because it has trade routes that are directly dealing with neighboring countries such as the Philippines, Malaysia, Brunei, Hong Kong, Taiwan, Japan and South Korea. In addition, Gorontalo is also one of the areas that is the entrance of trade routes from the Americas to countries in the Asia-Pacific region, such as Brunei, Singapore and Malaysia. The Indonesian Government considers that Gorontalo is one of the backbone of the economic, educational and cultural driving force in the Eastern Region of Indonesia.

The economy in Gorontalo is now one of the fastest growing economies in Indonesia. The agriculture, fisheries and services sector are the main sectors that is relied on in this province because it has a large contribution to local revenue.

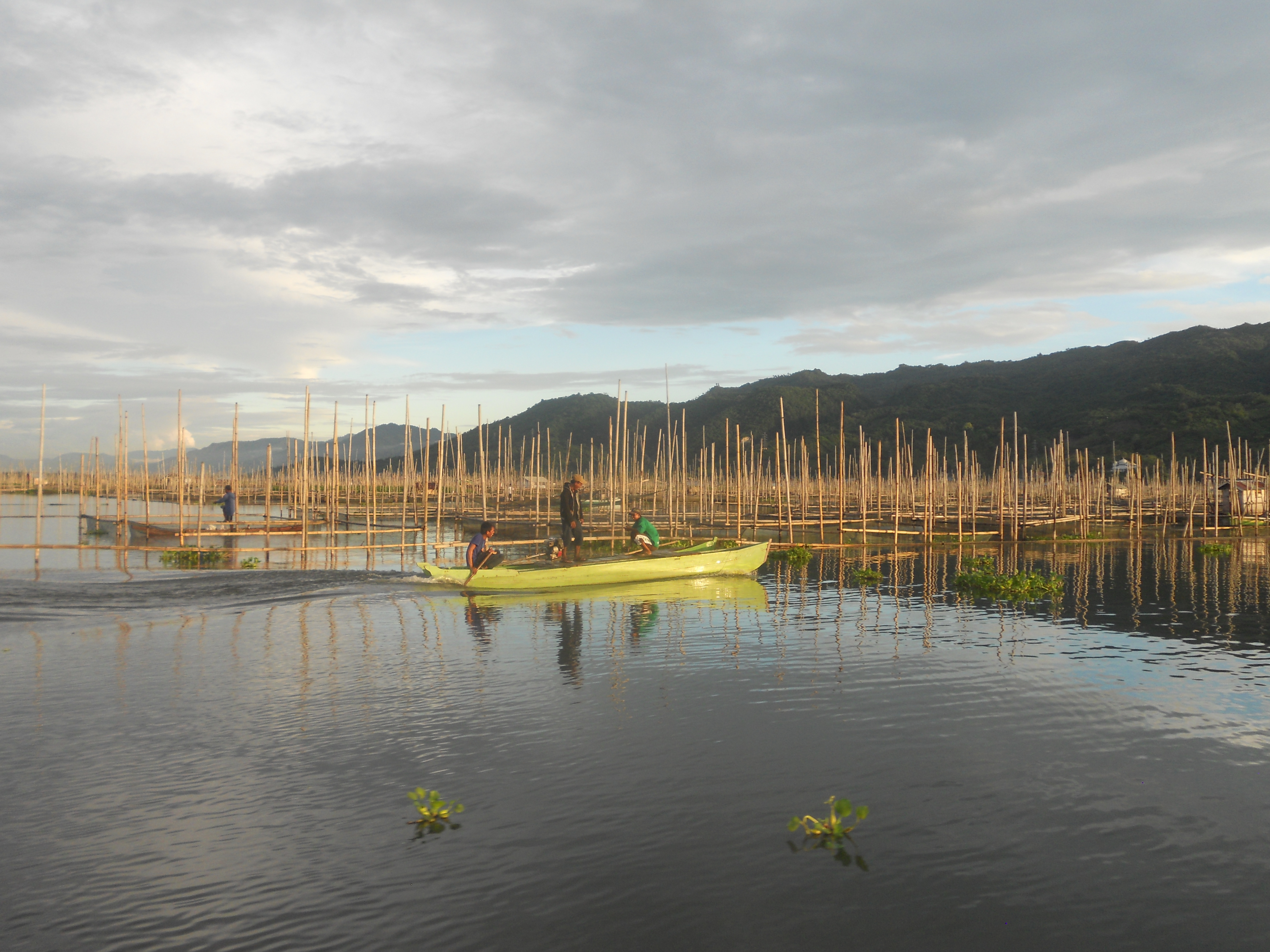
Fishing boats in Lake Limboto, Gorontalo. The fishing industry is one of the main source of income in the province

In order to realize Gorontalo as an agropolitan province, various efforts continue to be made. The Provincial Government carries out various types of development programs, including through infrastructure improvements as a pillar to drive development, providing agricultural production facilities, providing guarantor funds, increasing agricultural human resources, facilitating marketing with guaranteed basic prices etc., and by arranging various programs, such as

- Development of food crops, food diversification and regional food security;
- Agropolitan development towards one million tons of corn;
- Agro business development;
- Increasing the role and function of farmer institutions through the cultivation of agricultural communities.

In developing the potential and diversity of natural resources in Gorontalo, there are several investment opportunities to be developed, such as: investments in agro business (agriculture and plantations), including agro-industries (nata de coco, coconut oil, etc.) and in the fields of mining (gold, granite, etc.).

Development priorities over the next five years are projected on maize commodities with an area of maize production in 2004 covering an area of 35,692,450 ha, with a total production of 323,065 tons and for louning corn alone having been successfully exported at 9,148 tons. Of the total area of Gorontalo covering an area of 1,221,544 ha, for potential agricultural areas covering an area of 463,649.09 ha or 37.95%, but recently utilized an area of 148,312.78 ha (32%) or there are still opportunities for land development 315,336.31 ha.

Gorontalo is an agricultural area with flat topography, hilly to mountainous, so that various types of food crops can grow well in this area. The area of dry land is 215,845.00 ha. While swamps (moor) covering an area of 1,580.00 ha, the area of rice production in 2006 was 45,027 ha with the total production in 2006 as many as 197,600.94 tons and increased when compared to 2005 which had an area of 37,831 ha with total production as many as 164,168 tons.

The area of soybean production in 2006 was 5,217 ha with a total production of 6,767.21 tons, an increase compared to 2005 which had an area of 2,677 ha with a total production of 3,738 tons. The area of peanut production in 2006 was 2,825 ha with the total production of 3,316.79 tons increasing compared to 2005 which had an area of 4,335 ha with a total production reaching 5,371 tons. The area of cassava production in 2006 was 853 ha with total production reaching 9,742.0 tons. The area of production of cassava and tubers is 894.70 with total production of 10,041 tons. The area of vegetable production in 2006 was 3,674 ha with total production reaching 74.44 tons / ha.

The sea area in Gorontalo, especially in the Gulf of Tomini, holds a lot of natural potential because it is one of the bays that is passed by the equator. Fisheries and marine sector are the leading sectors for Gorontalo which have a long coastline. The coastlines of the North and South regions each have a length of about 270 kilometres and 320 kilometres. The potential of fisheries resources in Gorontalo is in three areas, namely the Gulf of Tomini, Sulawesi Sea, and Sulawesi Sea Exclusive Economic Zone (EEZ). Unfortunately, the utilization rate of new capture fisheries is only 24.05% or 19,771 tons per year.

Historical population
Year	Pop.	±%
1971	490,521	—
1980	600,323	+22.4%
1990	715,508	+19.2%
2000	835,044	+16.7%
2010	1,040,164	+24.6%
2020	1,171,681	+12.6%
2025	1,242,240	+6.0%
Source: Statistics Indonesia 2026 and earlier. Gorontalo was part of North Sulawesi Province until 2000.

== Demographics ==
The population in Gorontalo Province in 2020 was 1,171,681 people consisting of 591,349 men and 580,332 women. The population growth rate in Gorontalo Province in 2011 – 2013 reached 1.67 percent / year. Gorontalo Regency is the regency with the greatest population, while North Gorontalo Regency has the least.

=== Ethnicity ===
The Gorontaloan people forms the majority of the population in the province. They are spread from North Sulawesi in the east towards Central Sulawesi in the west. The Gorontaloan population is estimated to have reached more than 1 million people. The Gorontaloans are further divided into subgroups called "Pohala'a" which means "Family". Notable Pohala'as are Gorontalo, Suwawa, Limboto, Bolango and Atinggola. Currently, many Gorontaloans have migrated to other parts of Indonesia as well as overseas to pursue studies and jobs.

The Sama-Bajau people are sea nomads originally from the Southern Philippines. They lived in villages at the coast of Gorontalo. They spoke the Bajaw language, which is not mutually intelligible with the Gorontaloan language. Most of the Bajau people are engaged in the fishing industry.

Other ethnic groups are mostly immigrants from other parts of Indonesia, such as the Javanese and the Bugis. They mostly migrated due to the transmigration program enacted during the colonial era until it was abolished in 2015 by the Indonesian government.

=== Religion ===
Religion in Gorontalo (2022)
1. Islam (98.0%)
2. Christianity (1.54%)
3. Hinduism (0.34%)
4. Buddhism (0.08%)

Like many Indonesian provinces, Islam is the religion adopted by the majority of the people of Gorontalo. Based on the 2021 population estimate, 98% of the inhabitants were adherents of Islam. The teachings of Islam are thought to have entered Gorontalo in the 15th century from the Ternate and Bone. This can be seen in the artifacts that exist in the Hunto Sultan Amai Mosque in 1495. This mosque was built by Sultan Amai, King of the Gorontalo Sultanate who embraced Islam. In the present time, many non-governmental Islamic organisations such as Nahdlatul Ulama and Muhammadiyah has branch offices in Gorontalo.

Christians form the second-largest population in Gorontalo. Most Christians are immigrants from North Sulawesi as well as other parts of Indonesia. They form 2% of the population. There are several churches in Gorontalo, mostly located in the provincial capital.

There are other religions such as Hinduism and Buddhism which is mostly embraced by immigrants from other parts of Indonesia.

=== Language ===
Indonesian is the official language of the province as well as the country. Road signs and official documents released by the government are written in Indonesian. However, Gorontaloan language is the most spoken language in the province. Apart from Gorontaloan language, there are several languages that are similar which are considered by linguists as Gorontaloan dialects include Suwawa language, Atinggola language, Limboto language, Kwandang language, Tilamuta language and Sumawata language. Gorontaloan language is widely used due to the influence of the Gorontalo Kingdom that was once established in the region. Atinggola language is used by the Atinggola community situated on the northern coast of Gorontalo.

Today, Gorontaloan language itself have gone through assimilation with Manado Malay, which is also widely spoken by Gorontaloan people. In terms of linguistic, Gorontalo language are related to languages from North Sulawesi and the Philippines. Gorontalo language along with Mongondow language are part of the Gorontalo–Mongondow languages, which is part of the Philippine languages. The Philippine languages that are linguistically close to the Gorontalo language are such as Tagalog language, Cebuano language, Hiligaynon language, Bikol language and Waray-waray language. In present times, Gorontaloans used Latin alphabet for writing. However, the usage of Gorontaloan is limited to everyday living. In schools for education, the media, and official documents, the Indonesian language used as the national language.

In order to preserve regional languages, the Gorontaloan-Indonesian Language Dictionary was published, the Suwawa-Indonesian Language Dictionary and the Atinggola-Indonesian Language Dictionary. In addition, it has been successfully published and approved by the Ministry of Religion Affairs concerning the publication of the Qur'an which is equipped with Gorontaloan language translation. In addition, local content education in Gorontalo Language is still being maintained as teaching material in elementary schools. Gorontaloan was historically written in the Arabic-based Pegon script. Gorontalo actually had local script as a very high tribal identity, namely "Aksara Suwawa-Gorontalo".

== Culture ==
Distinctive characteristics of Gorontalo in the cultural sphere include typical foods, traditional houses, arts, and handicrafts such as filigree or woven basket skullcaps made of rattan called karanji upiya. The Gorontalo people also recognize various ceremonies as traditions, such as the traditional ceremony of opening fields, also known as Momuo Oayuwa, a ceremony for soil fertility known as Mopoahuta. The ceremony to request rain is called the Mohiledidi.

The Gorontalo people have a family kinship system called pohala'a. This system is a heritage of the kingdoms that had previously established in Gorontalo. There are five pohala'as in Gorontalo, namely Gorontalo, Limboto, Suwawa, Bualemo and Atinggola, where the Gorontalo pohala'a is the most prominent.

=== Traditional Houses ===
Gorontalo has many types of traditional houses that are characteristic of the province, including the Dulohupa traditional house located in Gorontalo City and the Bandayo Poboide traditional house in Limboto.

==== Dulohupa ====
In Gorontaloan language, Dulohupa means "Consensus". The name is in accordance with the functions of this traditional house which is often used to deliberate to reach consensus in traditional cases during the reign of Gorontalo kings in the past. Dulohupa's house is also used as a place to try someone who commits a crime.

There are 3 laws that are used in courts conducted in Dulohupa traditional houses, namely the law of defense and security which is used to try soldiers, or it can be said to be a military court (Buwatulo Bala), Islamic religious law (Buwatulo Syara), and customary law (Buwatulo Adati). In terms of its own architectural design, Gorontalo traditional house is unique. This traditional house has a stage structure with poles or pillars carved in such a way as decoration. The roof is made of quality straw plaited, while other parts of the house such as floors, walls, fences and stairs are made of wooden slats or boards.

The inside of the Dulohupa traditional house is not divided into several rooms but directly in the form of a large sized room. In the present, this room is no longer used to try someone. This room switches functions and is more often used as a place to hold traditional wedding ceremonies, or other traditional activities.

==== Bandayo Poboide ====
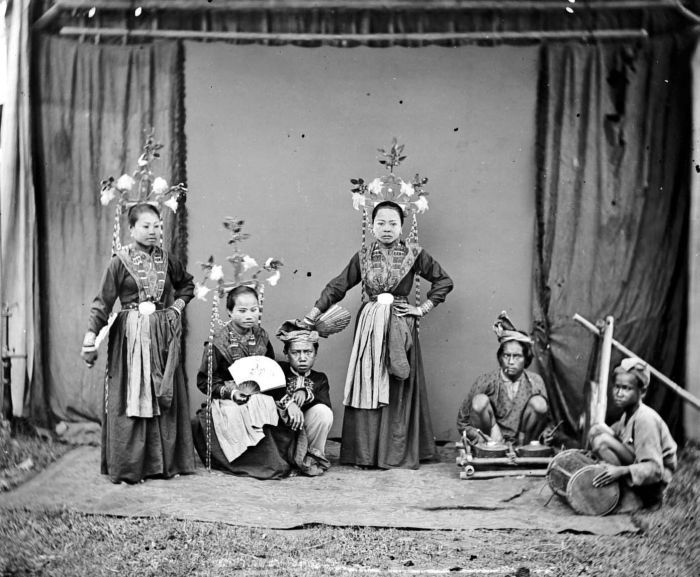
Tandako, a Gorontaloan traditional dance

The word "Bandayo" means a building or a building while the word "Poboide" or "Po Boide" means a place to consult. The Bandayo Pamboide traditional house is often used as a meeting place and traditional theater. This function is in accordance with the name of this traditional house, Bandayo, which means the temporary building of Pambide means a place for deliberation. The Bandayo Poboide traditional house is a stilt house that is made of high-quality wood so that it can survive until now. Formerly the Bandayo Poboide traditional house was also used as a king's palace as a center of government and a gathering place for traditional elders in discussing customary processions and also used as a place for carrying out Gorontalo cultural performances. But now the Bandayo Poboide traditional house is a place to preserve and develop Gorontalo arts and culture.

=== Handycrafts ===
Gorontaloan society has a characteristic "sandang" or clothing with accessories that complement it. The typical handicrafts of the people of Gorontalo are:

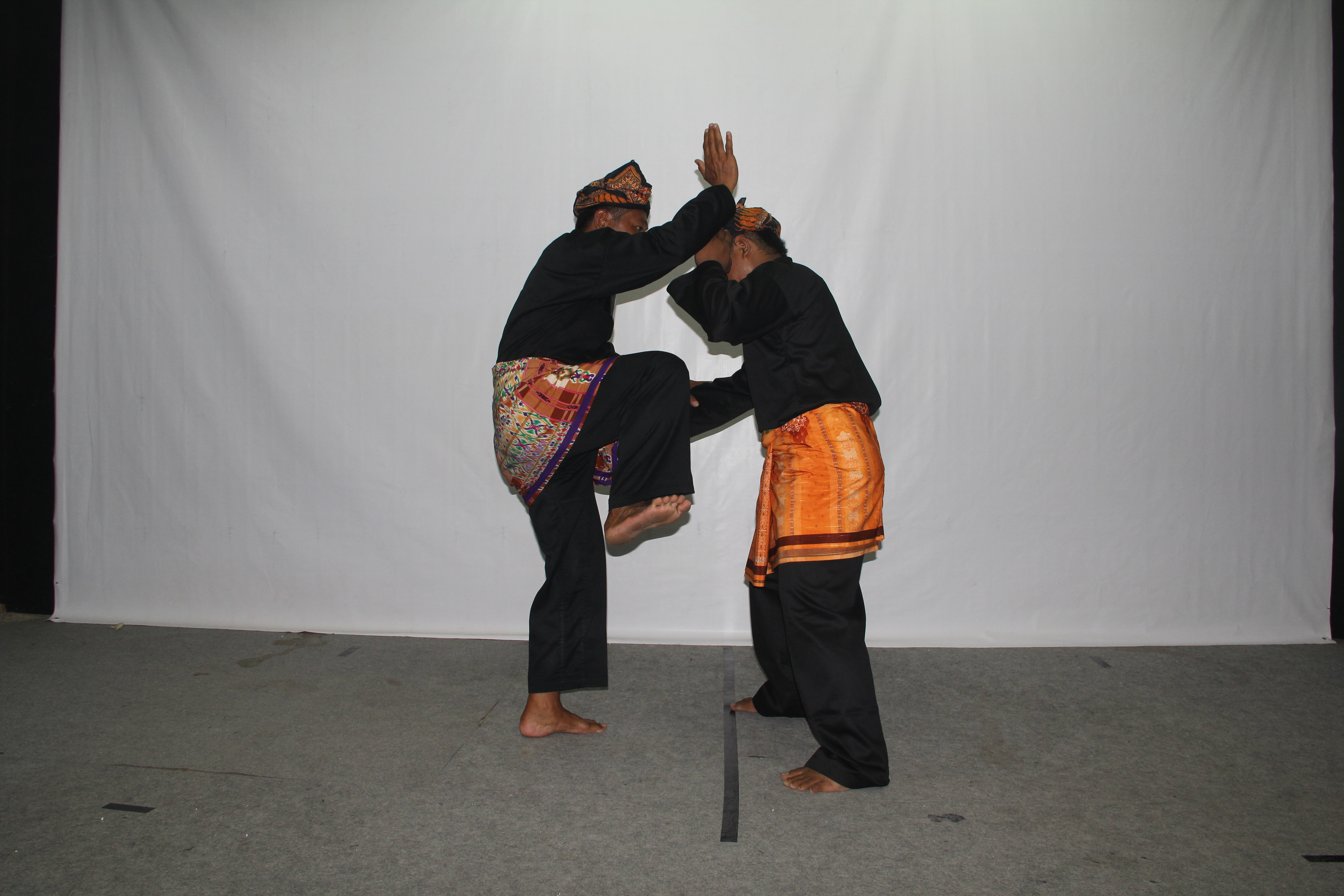
- Gorontaloan men practicing Langga, a traditional martial arts.
  Upiya Karanji or Songkok Gorontalo, this songkok is made of rattan woven and is very comfortable to use because it has very good air circulation. The 4th President of Indonesia, Abdurrahman Wahid, or better known as Gus dur, was known to often use Gorontalo Songkok.
- Sulaman Karawo or Sulaman Kerawang, Gorontalo's unique embroidery is a distinctive cultural property and of high artistic value. Now Karawo's embroidery is not only in demand in the country but also abroad.
- Gorontalo Batik, Gorontalo Batik is basically the same as Batik in general, which distinguishes it only from the motifs or patterns contained in the batik cloth itself.

=== Martial Art ===
Gorontalo also has a traditional martial arts called "Langga" or it can be called Silat Gorontalo. Basically, Langga is a martial arts type of Silat which is known as one of Gorontalo's cultural riches. Langga is a martial art that relies on defense and strength of hands and feet.

Traditional Food

- Binte Biluhuta: Gorontalo is one of the main producers of corn in Sulawesi island, and corn based food is a main staple of its traditional food. Binte Biluhuta literary meant "poured corn" which is made from grated corn mixed with grated coconut, shrimp, and chunks of skipjack tuna, then served with rich savory spiced broth.
- Kue Karawo: Also known as "Kue Karawang", Kue Karawo are cookies hand painted one by one with colorful sugar icing commonly served during community events such as Eid, Christmas or birthday events.
- Ilabulo: a traditional dish made from processed chicken, often served as side dish for big meals such as during lunch. It is prepared with chicken liver and gizzard, cooked together with banana blossom and a blend of spices, then wrapped in banana leaves and grilled until fully cooked.
- Perkedel nike: a dish made from fried nike fish. At a glance, nike fish resembles anchovies. It is prepared in a similar way to fritters (perkedel), mixed with traditional Gorontalo spices. Perkedel nike is a quite popular side dish served with steamed white rice.

== Tourism ==
Gorontalo consists mostly of mountainous areas that stretch from north to south of the province. The Gorontaloan mountains and forests are homes for unique flora and fauna. Anoa, Tarsius, Maleo, and Babirusa are among the rare species that can be found here. Maleo, for example, is a bird species whose eggs are larger than their own body. While Tarsius is the smallest primate in the world, but has a length of about 10 cm. Examples of trees native to Gorontalo are Ebon, Lingua, Nantu, Meranti, and Rattan Trees. In the southern part of Gorontalo, namely in the Gulf of Tomini, there are several small islands and uninhabitedscattered. Tomini Bay is crossed by the equator and is naturally inhabited by various types of marine animals. Because of this, Gulf of Tomini is a paradise for divers. Tourist spots in Gorontalo include the following:

=== Pulo Cinta ===
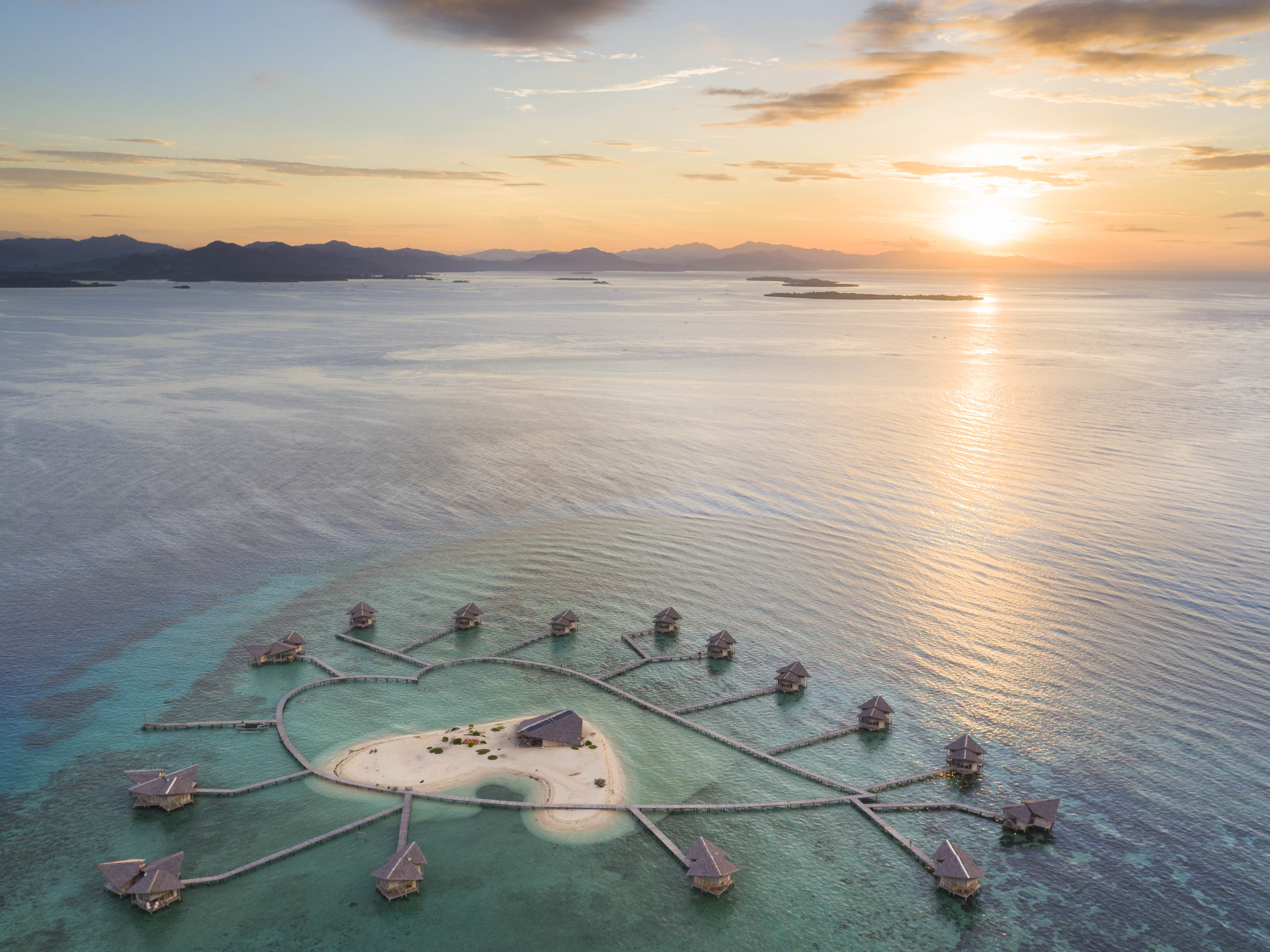
Pulocinta - Gorontalo

Pulo Cinta or "Love Islands" in English is located in Boalemo Regency. This heart-shaped island is equipped with several floating resorts. Pulo Cinta has become a destination for both local and foreign travelers, and often dubbed as "Maldives van Gorontalo".

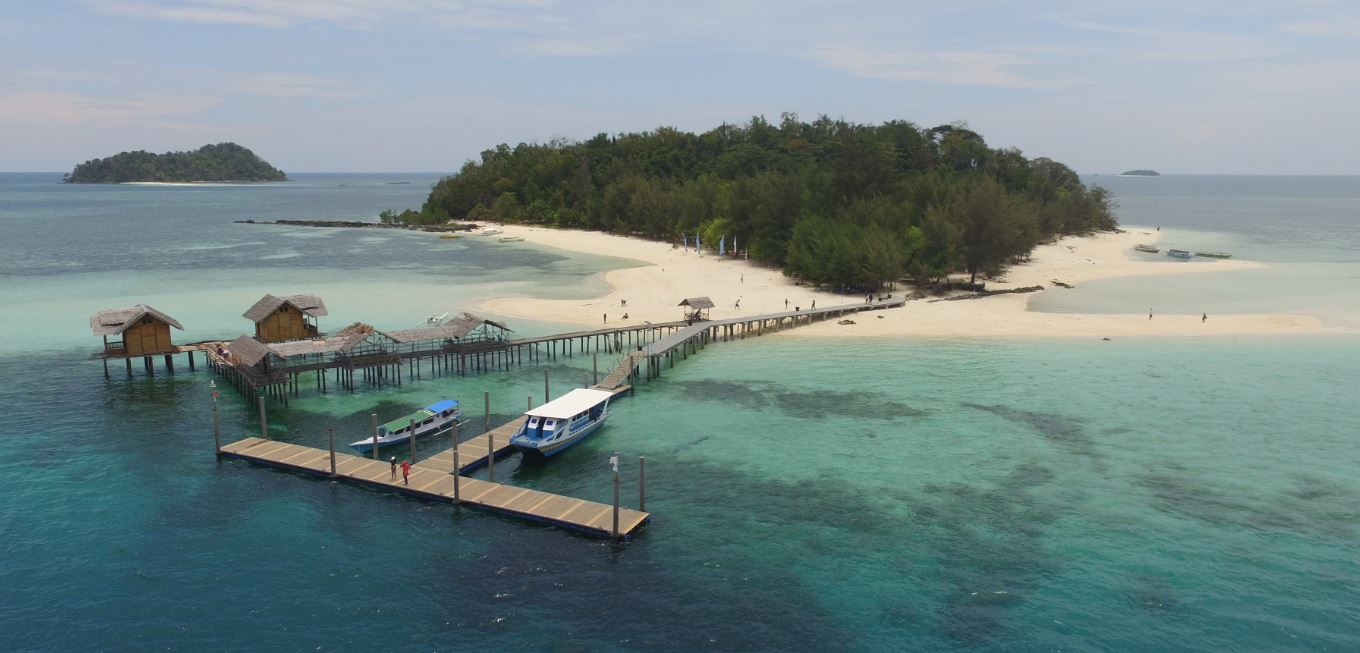
Saronde Island

=== Saronde Island ===
Saronde Island is Indonesia's flagship International Tourism in Gorontalo Province, located in Kwandang, North Gorontalo. Saronde Island is known for its white sand beaches, clear water and its surrounding coral reefs. Every year, this island is a stopover for yachts from all over the world. In addition to Saronde, there are 3 other nearby islands, namely Bogisa, Mohinggito, and Lampu islands.

=== Olele Marine Park ===
Olele Marine Park is one of the leading International Underwater Paradise of foreign divers in Bone Bolango Regency. This marine park is also well known to European divers. Olele Marine Park is famous for the uniqueness of Salvador Dalí Sponge, a species of sponge that cannot be found in any other marine parks in the world, even the marine park on Bunaken National Park in North Sulawesi does not have this type of sponge. This sponge is named Salvador Dalí because its physical appearance resembles a painting by Salvador Dalí.

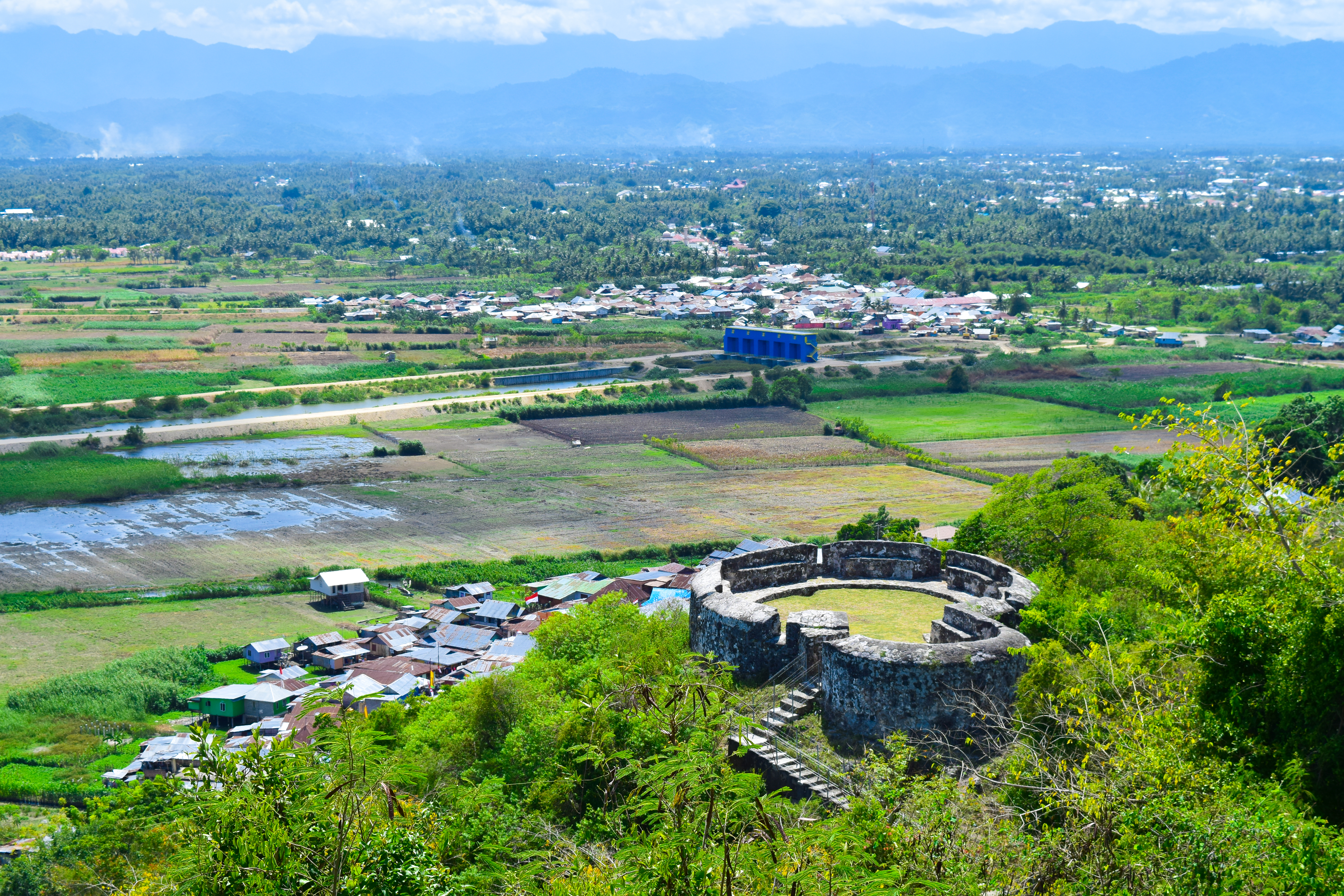
View of Gorontalo with Fort Otanaha in the foreground.

=== Fort Otanaha ===
In the past this was a legacy of former Portuguese colonization. Fort Otanaha, used by the Gorontalo Kings as a place of protection and defense. The uniqueness of the visible fort is the material used to build a mixture of sand, plaster, and egg white forts. The view of Lake Limboto can be seen clearly from here, because it is located on a plateau. Precisely, in Dembe I, Kota Barat, about 8 km from downtown Gorontalo. There are two more forts located in the same area, namely Otahiya and Ulupahu Palace. Visitors must pass 345 steps to reach it.

=== Lake Limboto ===
Lake Limboto is a large lake located in Gorontalo Regency. The lake with an area of around 3,000 hectares is the estuary of five major rivers, namely the Bone Bolango River, Alo River, Daenaa River, Bionga River and Molalahu River.

=== Botubarani Village ===
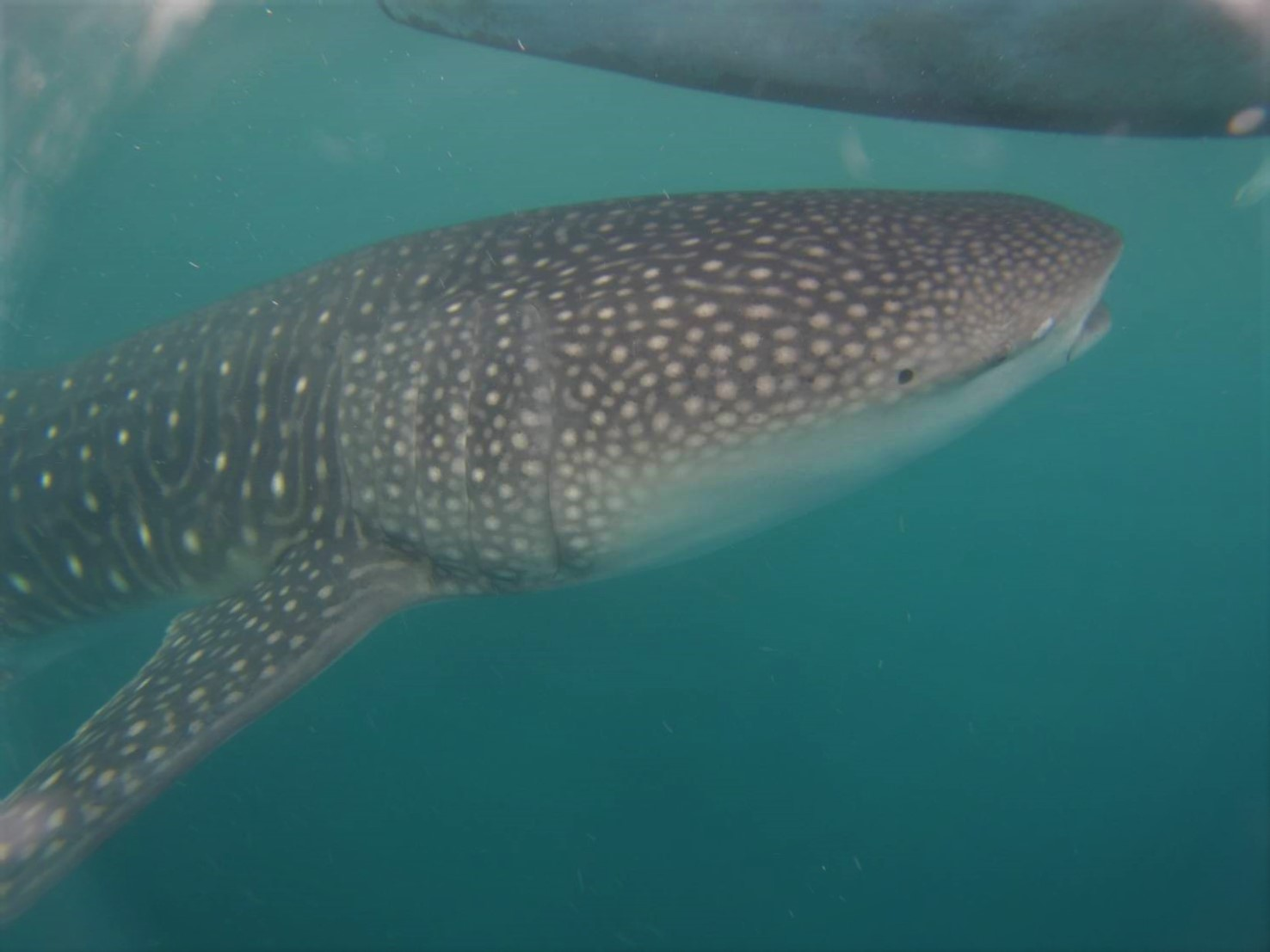
A whale shark in Botubarani

Botubarani Village, in Bone Bolango Regency, is a fishing village which is a tourist spot for observing whale sharks. It can be found from April to July.
