= Boalemo Regency =

Regency in Gorontalo, Indonesia

Boalemo Regency Kabupaten Boalemo
- Regency
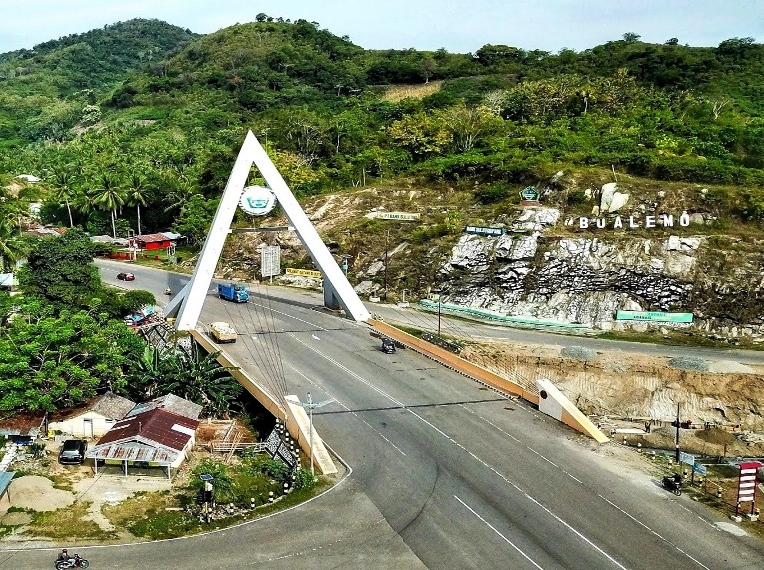
- Soeharto bridge in Tilamuta

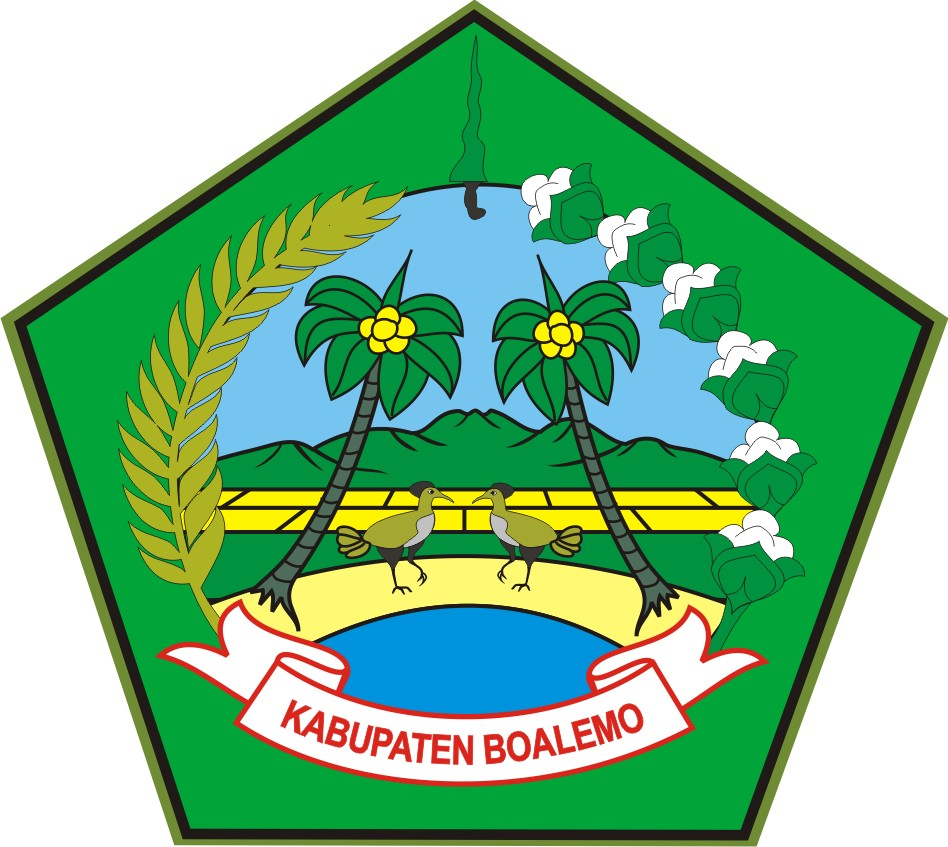
- Coat of arms

- Location within Gorontalo

- Location in Sulawesi Location in Indonesia
- Coordinates: 0°39′N 122°19′E
- Country: Indonesia
- Province: Gorontalo
- Capital: Tilamuta
- Founded: 12 October 1999

Government
  - Regent: Rum Pagau
  - Vice Regent: Lahmuddin Hambali

Area
  - Total: 1,830.87 km^{2} (706.90 sq mi)

Population (mid 2025 estimate)
  - Total: 155,183
  - Density: 84.7592/km^{2} (219.525/sq mi)
- Time zone: UTC+8 (ICST)
- Area code: (+62) 443
- Website: portal.boalemokab.go.id

Boalemo is a regency of Gorontalo Province, Indonesia. It is located on the northern peninsula of the island of Sulawesi. It was established in 1999 under Law Number (Undang-Undang Nomor) 50/1999. It has an area of 1,830.87 km^{2}, and had a population of 129,253 at the 2010 Census and 145,868 at the 2020 census; the official estimate as at mid 2025 was 155,183 (comprising 78,955 males and 76,228 females). The seat of the regency administration is the town of Tilamuta.

== Geography ==
Boalemo Regency is located between 0o 23’ 55’’ and 0o 55’ 38’’ North latitude, and between 122o 01’ 12’’ and 122o 39’ 17’’ East longitude. Its boundaries are as follows:

- North - Gorontalo Regency and Gorontalo Utara Regency;
- South - Tomini Bay;
- West - Pohuwato Regency;
- East - Gorontalo Regency.

== Administrative districts ==
Boalemo Regency is now divided into seven districts (kecamatan), tabulated below with their areas and their populations at the 2010 Census and 2020 Census, together with the official estimates as at 2025. The table also includes the locations of the district administrative centres, the number of administrative villages (all classed as rural desa) in each district, and its postal codes.

Kode Wilayah	Name of District (kecamatan)	Area in km^{2}	Pop'n Census 2010	Pop'n Census 2020	Pop'n Estimate 2025	Admin centre	No. of villages	Post codes
75.02.05	Mananggu ^{(a)}	300.92	11,500	12,854	13,705	Tabulo	9	96265
75.02.04	Tilamuta ^{(b)}	190.63	26,417	30,230	31,733	Modelomo	12	96263
75.02.03	Dulupi ^{(c)}	300.92	15,222	17,274	18,036	Dulupi	8	96267
75.02.06	Botumoito ^{(d)}	487.38	14,126	15,339	16,159	Patoameme	9	96264
75.02.01	Paguyaman	195.43	29,753	33,912	36,181	Molombulahe	22	96260
75.02.02	Wonosari	236.08	24,818	28,398	29,369	Bongo II	14	96262
75.02.07	Paguyaman Pantai	119.45	7,417	8,349	8,925	Bubaa	8	96262
	Totals	1,830.87	129,253	145,868	154,108	Tilamuta	82	

Notes: (a) including 7 offshore islands. (b) including 10 offshore islands. (c) including 2 offshore islands. (d) including 2 offshore islands.
