= Elnino Mohi =

Indonesian politician (born 1974)

Member of the House of Representatives
- Incumbent
- Assumed office 1 October 2014
- Constituency: Gorontalo

Personal details
- Born: 30 October 1974 (age 51)
- Party: Gerindra Party

Elnino M. Husein Mohi (born 30 October 1974) is an Indonesian politician serving as a member of the House of Representatives since 2014. From 2009 to 2014, he was a member of the Regional Representative Council.
