= Bone Bolango Regency =

Regency in Gorontalo, Indonesia

Coordinates: 0°33′N 123°12′E

Bone Bolango Regency Kabupaten Bone Bolango
- Regency
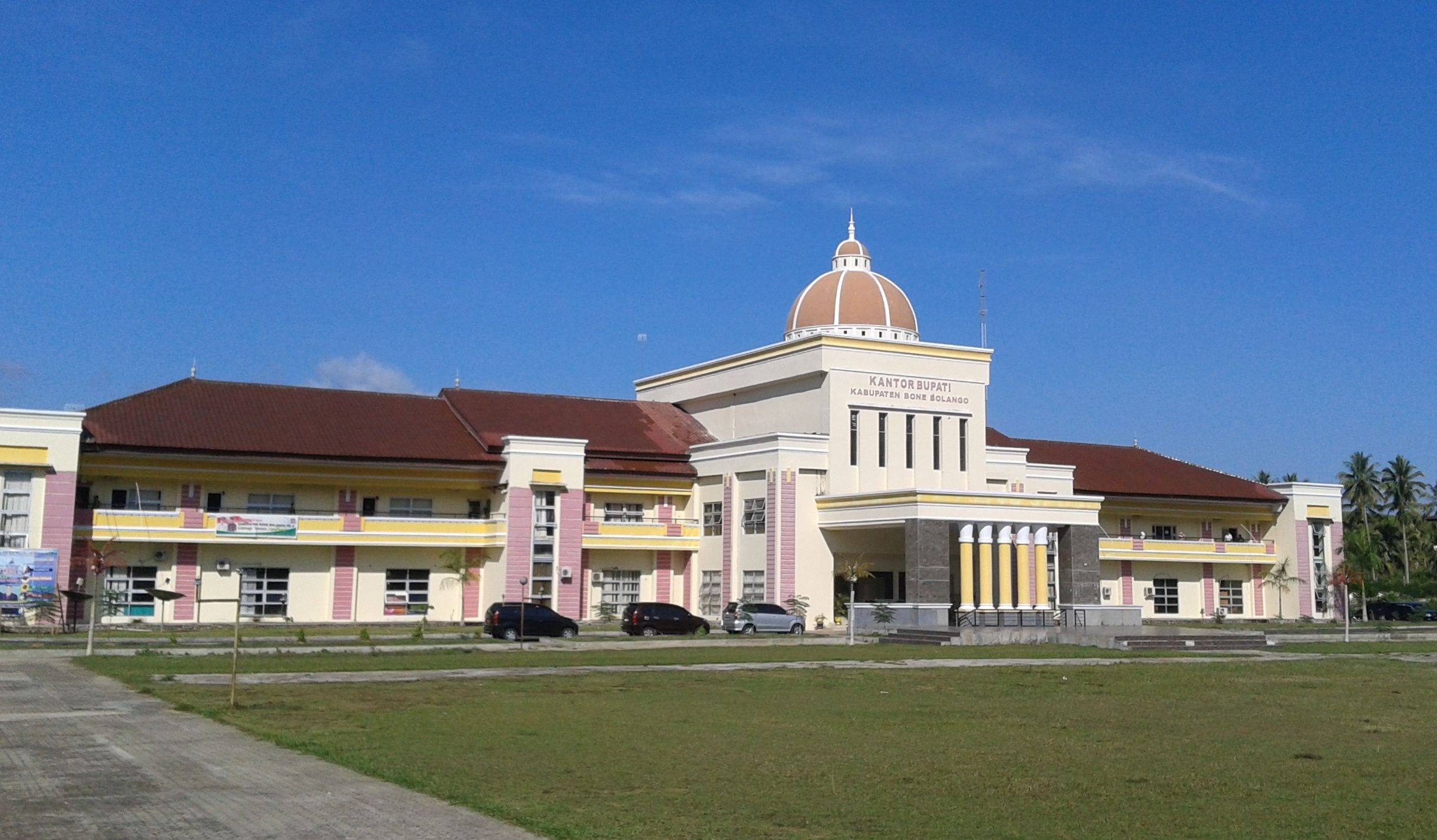
- Office of Bone Bolango Regent

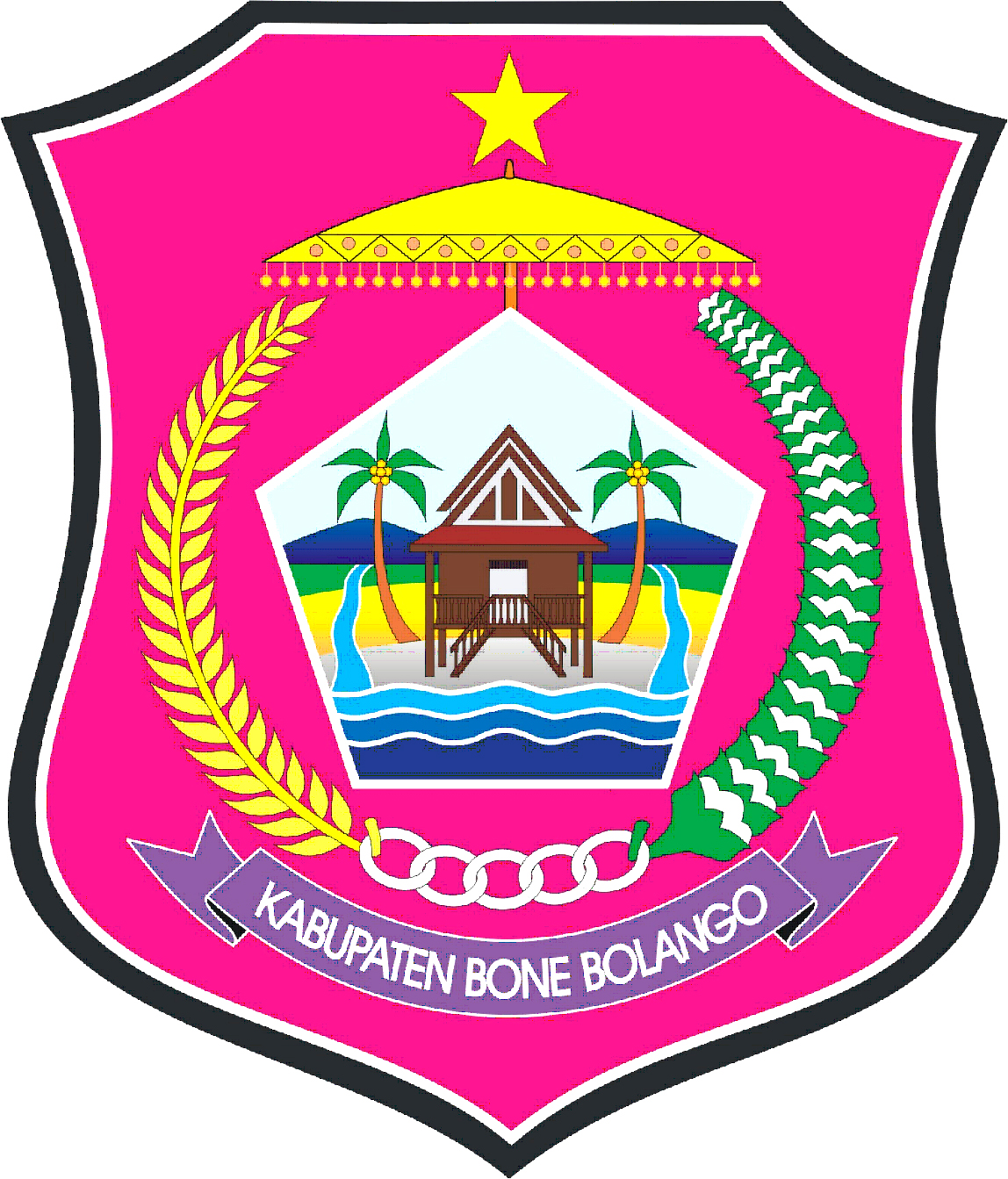
- Coat of arms

- Country: Indonesia
- Province: Gorontalo
- Capital: Suwawa

Government
  - Regent: Ismet Mile
  - Vice Regent: Risman Tolingguhu

Area
  - Total: 1,887.71 km^{2} (728.85 sq mi)

Population (mid 2025 estimate)
  - Total: 175,424
  - Density: 92.9295/km^{2} (240.686/sq mi)

Bone Bolango (Indonesian pronunciation: [ˌbone boˈlaŋo]) is a regency of Gorontalo Province, Indonesia, on the island of Sulawesi. It was established in 2003 under Law Number (Undang-Undang Nomor) 6/2003 from the former eastern districts of Gorontalo Regency. It has a land area of 1,887.71 km^{2} and had a population of 141,915 at the 2010 Census and 162,778 at the 2020 Census; the official estimate as at mid 2025 was 175,424 (comprising 88,333 males and 87,091 females). The administrative centre of the regency is the town of Suwawa.

== Administrative districts ==
Originally comprising four districts (kecamatan) when it was established in 2003, the Regency was by 2010 re-divided into seventeen districts, and an additional district (Pinogu District) was subsequently created by the splitting of the existing Suwawa Timur District. The districts are tabulated below with their areas and their populations at the 2010 Census and the 2020 Census, together with the official estimates as at mid 2025. The table also includes the locations of the district administrative centres, the number of administrative villages in each district (totaling 160 rural desa and 5 urban kelurahan - the latter all in Kabila District), and its postal codes.

Kode Wilayah	Name of District (kecamatan)	Area in km^{2}	Pop'n Census 2010	Pop'n Census 2020	Pop'n Estimate mid 2025	Admin centre	No. of villages	Post codes
75.03.01	Tapa	13.44	6,871	7,601	8,109	Talulobutu	7	96545
75.03.05	Bulango Utara (North Bulango)	60.50	6,933	7,998	8,728	Boidu	9	96544
75.03.15	Bulango Selatan ^{(a)} (South Bulango)	5.62	9,711	10,779	11,969	Tinelo Ayula	10	96541
75.03.16	Bulango Timur (East Bulango)	11.91	4,995	5,728	6,174	Bulotalang	5	96542
75.03.14	Bulango Ulu (Upper Bulango)	373.06	3,612	4,145	4,480	Mongiilo	6	96543
	Former Bolango District	464.53	32,122	36,251	39,460		37	
75.03.02	Kabila	12.63	21,004	23,887	24,913	Olohuta	12 ^{(b)}	96552
75.03.07	Botupingge	12.73	5,598	6,643	7,291	Timbuolo Timur	9	96551
75.03.06	Tilongkabila	39.42	16,569	19,257	20,445	Bongoime	14	96554
	Former Kabila District	64.78	43,171	49,787	52,649		35	
75.03.03	Suwawa	25.78	10,688	13,056	14,247	Boludawa	10	96562
75.03.12	Suwawa Selatan (South Suwawa)	57.02	4,796	5,523	6,169	Molintogupo	8	96563
75.03.11	Suwawa Timur (East Suwawa)	266.13	6,578	5,341	6,101	Dumbayabulan	9	96565
75.03.13	Suwawa Tengah (Central Suwawa)	45.36	5,716	6,432	6,813	Duano	6	96564
75.03.18	Pinogu	496.00	^{(c)}	2,054	2,055	Pinogu	5	96561
	Former Suwana District	890.29	27,778	32,406	35,385		38	
75.03.04	Bone Pantai	104.37	9,776	10,729	11,391	Bilungala	13	96573
75.03.08	Kabila Bone	58.61	9,755	11,454	12,489	Huangobotu	9	96553
75.03.10	Bone Raya	65.30	5,876	6,926	7,410	Mopiya	10	96572
75.03.09	Bone	152.01	8,674	9,870	10,780	Taludaa	14	96571
75.03.17	Bulawa	87.82	4,763	5,355	5,860	Kaidundu	9	96574
	Former Bone District	468.11	38,844	44,334	47,930		55	
	Regency Totals	1,887.71	141,915	162,778	175,424	Suwawa	165	

Notes: (a) South Bolango District is a northern suburb of Gorontalo city. (b) comprising 5 kelurahan (Oluhuta, Oluhuta Utara, Padengo, Pauwo and Tumbihe) and 7 desa. (c) the 2010 population of the new Pinogu District is included in the figure for the existing Suwawa Timur District, from which it was cut out.

== Beaches and underwater cave ==
Olele Beach in Kabila Bone District is 27 kilometres from Gorontalo or around an hour's drive on poor condition roads. The beach is ideal for diving to see various giant coral sponges. In the left side of Olele's beach there is vertical Jin Cave with 50 metres depth. Olele Beach is protected from extreme current, so diving can be done day and night along the year. Besides the Olele dive site, there are totaling 23 spots along the southern coast of Gorontalo from Biluhu village to Bilungala village.
