= North Gorontalo Regency =

Regency in Gorontalo, Indonesia

Coordinates: 0°46′12″N 122°19′00″E

North Gorontalo Regency Kabupaten Gorontalo Utara
- Regency
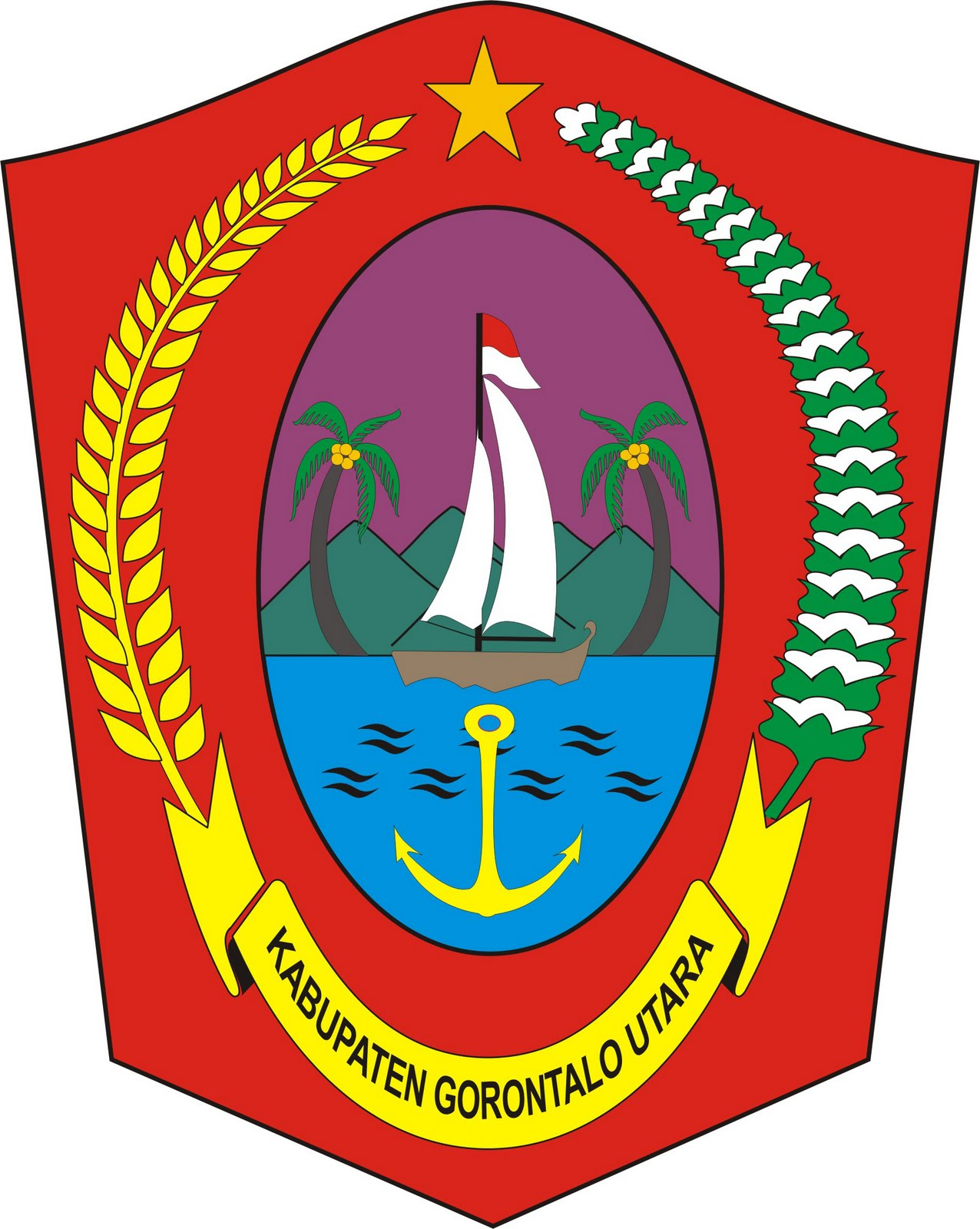
- Coat of arms

- Country: Indonesia
- Province: Gorontalo
- Capital: Kwandang

Government
  - Type: Kabupaten
  - Acting Regent: Sila Nurainsyah Botutihe

Area
  - Total: 1,777.02 km^{2} (686.11 sq mi)

Population (mid 2025 estimate)
  - Total: 132,553
  - Density: 74.5929/km^{2} (193.195/sq mi)

North Gorontalo (Gorontalo Utara) is a regency of Gorontalo Province, Indonesia, stretching along the entire northern coast of the province. It is located on the northern peninsula of the island of Sulawesi. It was established on 2 January 2007 under Law Number (Undang-Undang Nomor) 11/2007 from the former northern districts of Gorontalo Regency. The new regency has an area of 1,777.02 km^{2}, and it had a population of 104,133 at the 2010 Census and 124,957 at the 2020 Census; the official estimate as at mid 2025 was 132,553 (comprising 67,556 males and 64,997 females). Its regency seat is the town of Moluo in Kwandang District.

== Administration ==
In 2010 the Regency comprised six districts (kecamatan), but subsequently five additional districts were created by splitting of four of the original six. The districts are tabulated below in geographical order from east to west, with their areas and their populations at the 2010 Census and 2020 Census; together with the official estimates as at mid 2025. The table includes the locations of the district administrative centres, the number of rural villages in each district (all 123 classed as rural desa), and its postal code.

| Kode Wilayah | Name of District (kecamatan) | Area in km^{2} | Pop'n Census 2010 | Pop'n Census 2020 | Pop'n Estimate mid 2025 | Admin centre | No. of villages | Post code |
|---|---|---|---|---|---|---|---|---|
| 75.05.01 | Atinggola | 265.55 | 10,299 | 12,121 | 12,677 | Kotajin | 14 | 96516 |
| 75.05.06 | Gentuma Raya | 100.34 | 7,972 | 10,003 | 10,541 | Gentuma | 11 | 96513 |
| 75.05.07 | Tomilito | 99.31 | ^{(a)} | 9,708 | 10,516 | Dambalo | 10 | 96512 |
| 75.05.08 | Ponelo Kepulauan (Ponelo Islands) | 7.83 | ^{(a)} | 4,110 | 4,279 | Ponelo | 4 | 96517 |
| 75.05.02 | Kwandang | 190.75 | 35,965 | 28,792 | 30,327 | Titidu | 18 | 96518 |
| 75.05.03 | Anggrek | 141.51 | 20,230 | 17,718 | 17,986 | Ilangata | 15 | 96525 |
| 75.05.09 | Monano | 144.02 | ^{(b)} | 7,117 | 7,971 | Mokonowu | 10 | 96526 |
| 75.05.11 | Sumalata Timur (East Sumalita) | 197.55 | ^{(c)} | 7,662 | 8,376 | Buladu | 10 | 96515 |
| 75.05.04 | Sumalata | 305.59 | 16,038 | 11,428 | 12,313 | Bulontio Barat | 11 | 96514 |
| 75.05.10 | Biau | 111.69 | ^{(d)} | 5,611 | 6,123 | Biau | 10 | 96523 |
| 75.05.05 | Tolinggula | 213.89 | 13,629 | 10,687 | 11,444 | Tolinggula Tengah | 10 | 96524 |
| | Totals | 1,777.02 | 104,133 | 124,957 | 132,553 | Kwandang | 123 | |

Notes: (a) the 2010 populations of the new Tomilito and Ponelo Kepulauan Districts are included in the figure for Kwandang District (from which they were split). (b) the 2010 populations of the new Monano District is included in the figure for Anggrek District (from which it was split). (c) the 2010 population of the new Sumalata Timur District is included in the figure for Sumalata District (from which it was split). (d) the 2010 population of the new Biau District is included in the figure for Tolinggula District (from which it was split).

Five of the original six districts included a variety of smaller islands off the north coast of Sulawesi. The numbers of these (by original district) were:

- Atingola District - 3
- Gentuma Raya District - 0
- Kwandang District - 21 (including the Ponelo Islands group, now a separate district)
- Angrek District - 16
- Sumalata District - 11
- Tolinggula District - 1 (Pulau Tolinggula)

== Tourism ==
Saronde Island is the number one tourist destination in this region. There were more than 16,000 tourists who visited this Island in 2016. This island can be reached from the Kwandang District port of Moluo using local boat transportation called Taxi Saronde. It takes 30–40 minutes to reach the island from Kwandang seaport. White beach sand and crystal clear water is this island's main attraction.

Oranye fortress. This old Portuguese fortress can be found in Kecamatan Kwandang, near the seaport. Built in the 1500s, this fortress consists of three towers and a large central grass field.

Raja Island Conservation. The islands of Pepaya, Mas and Raja, located in Sumalata Village (about 30 km from Saronde Island), have been named a nature reserve since the Dutch colonial time in 1936. Four of the only seven species of turtles can be found in the islands, the world's best turtle habitat. They include Penyu Hijau (Chelonia midas), Penyu Sisik (Eretmochelys imbricata), Penyu Tempayan (Caretta caretta) and Penyu Belimbing (Dermochelys coriacea). In 2011, the habitat was threatened by human activities such as illegal poaching and fish bombing activities; furthermore a lot of coral reefs, which represent a source of food for turtles, have been damaged.
