= List of tarsiiformes =

Species in mammal infraorder Tarsiiformes

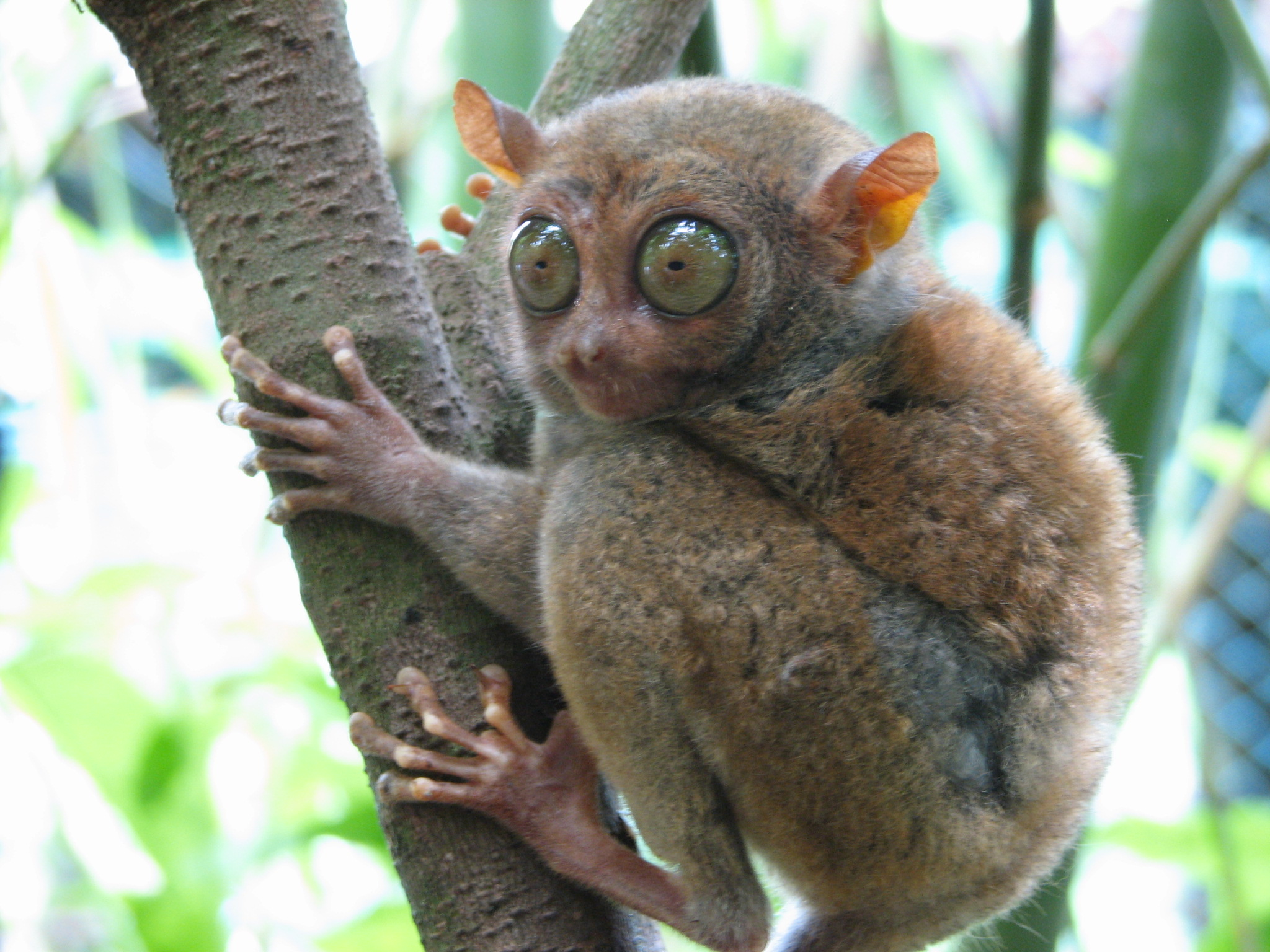
Philippine tarsier (Carlito syrichta)

Tarsiiformes is an infraorder of small primates. It contains a single extant family, Tarsiidae, and members of this infraorder are called tarsiiformes, with members of the family named tarsiers. Tarsiiformes is one of the six major groups in the order Primates. They are found in Maritime Southeast Asia, primarily in forests, though some species can also be found in caves or wetlands. They range in size from the pygmy tarsier, at 8 cm (3 in) plus a 20 cm (8 in) tail, to the Philippine tarsier, at 16 cm (6 in) plus a 25 cm (10 in) tail. Tarsiers are carnivorous and primarily eat insects, though they also consume small vertebrates such as lizards, birds, or bats. The only tarsier with a population estimate is Niemitz's tarsier, estimated at 10,000 to 20,000 mature individuals, but it, along with the Peleng tarsier, pygmy tarsier, and Sangihe tarsier, is categorized as endangered species, while the Siau Island tarsier is classified as critically endangered.

The fourteen extant species of Tarsiiformes are divided into three genera: Carlito and Cephalopachus, each with a single species, and Tarsius, containing the other twelve. A few extinct prehistoric Tarsiiformes species have been discovered, though due to ongoing research and discoveries the exact number and categorization is not fixed.

== Conventions ==
IUCN Red List categories
Conservation status
- EX: Extinct (0 species)
- EW: Extinct in the wild (0 species)
- CR: Critically endangered (1 species)
- EN: Endangered (4 species)
- VU: Vulnerable (7 species)
- NT: Near threatened (1 species)
- LC: Least concern (0 species)

Other categories
- DD: Data deficient (1 species)
- NE: Not evaluated (0 species)

The author citation for the species or genus is given after the scientific name; parentheses around the author citation indicate that this was not the original taxonomic placement. Conservation status codes listed follow the International Union for Conservation of Nature (IUCN) Red List of Threatened Species. Range maps are provided wherever possible; if a range map is not available, a description of the tarsier's range is provided. Ranges are based on the IUCN Red List for that species unless otherwise noted.

== Classification ==
The infraorder Tarsiiformes consists of one extant family: Tarsiidae, containing fourteen species divided between three genera. Carlito and Cephalopachus each have a single species, and Tarsius contains the other twelve.

Family Tarsiidae

- Genus Carlito (Philippine tarsier): one species
- Genus Cephalopachus (Horsfield's tarsier): one species
- Genus Tarsius (tarsiers): twelve species

== Tarsiiformes ==
The following classification is based on the taxonomy described by the reference work Mammal Species of the World (2005), with augmentation by generally accepted proposals made since using molecular phylogenetic analysis, as supported by both the IUCN and the American Society of Mammalogists.

=== Family Tarsiidae ===
Genus Carlito – Groves & Shekelle, 2010 – one species
Common name	Scientific name and subspecies	Range	Size and ecology	IUCN status and estimated population
Philippine tarsier	C. syrichta (Linnaeus, 1758)	Southeastern Philippines	Size: 8–16 cm (3–6 in) long, plus about 25 cm (10 in) tail Habitat: Forest Diet: Insects, spiders, lizards, and other small vertebrates	NT Unknown

Genus Cephalopachus – Swainson, 1835 – one species
Common name	Scientific name and subspecies	Range	Size and ecology	IUCN status and estimated population
Horsfield's tarsier	T. bancanus (Horsfield, 1821) Three subspecies: T. b. bancanus; T. b. borneanus; T. b. saltator	Western Philippines	Size: 11–15 cm (4–6 in) long, plus 20–24 cm (8–9 in) tail Habitat: Forest Diet: Insects, as well as small vertebrates including birds, mammals, and reptiles	VU Unknown

Genus Tarsius – Storr, 1780 – twelve species
Common name	Scientific name and subspecies	Range	Size and ecology	IUCN status and estimated population
Dian's tarsier	T. dentatus Miller & Hollister, 1921	Central Sulawesi, Indonesia	Size: 11–12 cm (4–5 in) long, plus 13–28 cm (5–11 in) tail Habitat: Forest Diet: Insects, as well as small vertebrates	VU Unknown
Gursky's spectral tarsier	T. spectrumgurskyae Shekelle, Groves, Maryanto & Mittermeier, 2017	Northeastern Sulawesi (in purple)	Size: About 14 cm (6 in) long, plus 21–27 cm (8–11 in) tail Habitat: Forest Diet: Insects, as well as small vertebrates	VU Unknown
Jatna's tarsier	T. supriatnai Shekelle, Groves, Maryanto & Mittermeier, 2017	Northern Sulawesi (in gray)	Size: About 14 cm (6 in) long, plus 23–25 cm (9–10 in) tail Habitat: Forest Diet: Insects, as well as small vertebrates	VU Unknown
Lariang tarsier	T. lariang Groves & Merker, 2006	Central Sulawesi	Size: About 12 cm (5 in) long, plus 12–21 cm (5–8 in) tail Habitat: Forest Diet: Insects, as well as small vertebrates	DD Unknown
Makassar tarsier	T. fuscus Fischer von Waldheim, 1804	Southern Sulawesi (in yellow)	Size: 12–13 cm (5 in) long, plus 24–26 cm (9–10 in) tail Habitat: Forest and caves Diet: Insects, as well as small vertebrates	VU Unknown
Niemitz's tarsier	T. niemitzi Shekelle, Groves, Maryanto, Mittermeier, Salim & Springer, 2019	Northern Sulawesi (circled in black)	Size: About 14 cm (6 in) long, plus 24–26 cm (9–10 in) tail Habitat: Forest Diet: Insects, as well as small vertebrates	EN 10,000–20,000
Peleng tarsier	T. pelengensis Sody, 1949	Eastern Sulawesi	Size: 12–14 cm (5–6 in) long, plus 25–27 cm (10–11 in) tail Habitat: Forest Diet: Insects, as well as frogs, lizards, and other small vertebrates	EN Unknown
Pygmy tarsier	T. pumilus Miller, Hollister, 1921	Central Sulawesi	Size: 8–11 cm (3–4 in) long, plus 20–21 cm (8 in) tail Habitat: Forest Diet: Arthropods and insects, as well as small vertebrates	EN Unknown
Sangihe tarsier	T. sangirensis Meyer, 1897	Sangir Island, southeastern Philippines	Size: 12–13 cm (5 in) long, plus about 30 cm (12 in) tail Habitat: Forest and inland wetlands Diet: Insects, as well as birds, lizards, and other small vertebrates	EN Unknown
Siau Island tarsier	T. tumpara Shekelle, Groves, Merker & Supriatna, 2008	Siau Island, north of Sulawesi	Size: 10–15 cm (4–6 in) long, plus about 20 cm (8 in) tail Habitat: Forest Diet: Arthropods, as well as small vertebrates	CR Unknown
Spectral tarsier	T. tarsier (Erxleben, 1777)	Sulawesi	Size: 9–14 cm (4–6 in) long, plus 20–26 cm (8–10 in) tail Habitat: Forest Diet: Insects, as well as lizards, bats, and other small vertebrates	VU Unknown
Wallace's tarsier	T. wallacei Merker, Driller, Dahruddin, Wirdateti, Sinaga, Perwitasari-Farajallah & Shekelle, 2010	Northern Sulawesi (in orange)	Size: 11–13 cm (4–5 in) long, plus 23–27 cm (9–11 in) tail Habitat: Forest and inland wetlands Diet: Insects, as well as small vertebrates	VU Unknown

== Sources ==
- Groves, Colin P. (2005). Wilson, Don E.; Reeder, DeeAnn M. (eds.). Mammal Species of the World. Vol. 1 (3rd ed.). Johns Hopkins University Press. ISBN 978-0-8018-8221-0.
- Supriatna, Jatna (2022). Field Guide to the Primates of Indonesia. Springer Nature. ISBN 978-3-03-083206-3.
