= Jatna's tarsier =

Conservation status
- Vulnerable (IUCN 3.1)

Scientific classification
- Kingdom: Animalia
- Phylum: Chordata
- Class: Mammalia
- Order: Primates
- Family: Tarsiidae
- Genus: Tarsius
- Species: T. supriatnai

Binomial name
- Tarsius supriatnai Shekelle, Groves, Maryanto & Mittermeier, 2017

Species of primate

The Jatna’s tarsier (Tarsius supriatnai), also known locally as Mimito, is a species of tarsier endemic to the northern Sulawesi, Gorontalo, Indonesia. Previously classified together with the Spectral tarsier, this species was reclassified and elevated as a separate species in 2017 due to their distinct and separate acoustic duet calls between males and females.

== Taxonomy and etymology ==
=== Taxonomic history, discovery, and classification ===
Following the taxonomic revision of the Tarsiidae primate family in 2010 by the primatologists Colin Groves and Myron Shekelle, all tarsiers found in northern Sulawesi were initially classified under the taxon Spectral tarsier (Tarsius spectrum). However, subsequent studies conducted in 2017 by a team of researchers led by Myron Shekelle in the Nantu Wildlife Reserve in Gorontalo, Sulawesi later described a local population of spectral tarsiers found in the area with a distinct acoustic duet call between males and females. This population was then later reclassified and elevated as a separate species under the genus Tarsius.

=== Etymology ===
The species was named Jatna's tarsier (Tarsuis supriatnai) in honour of Dr. Jatna Supriatna, an Indonesian conservationist who has dedicated much of his professional life contributing to biodiversity and environmental conservation works in Indonesia, particularly on tarsiers.

== Ecology ==
=== Morphology ===
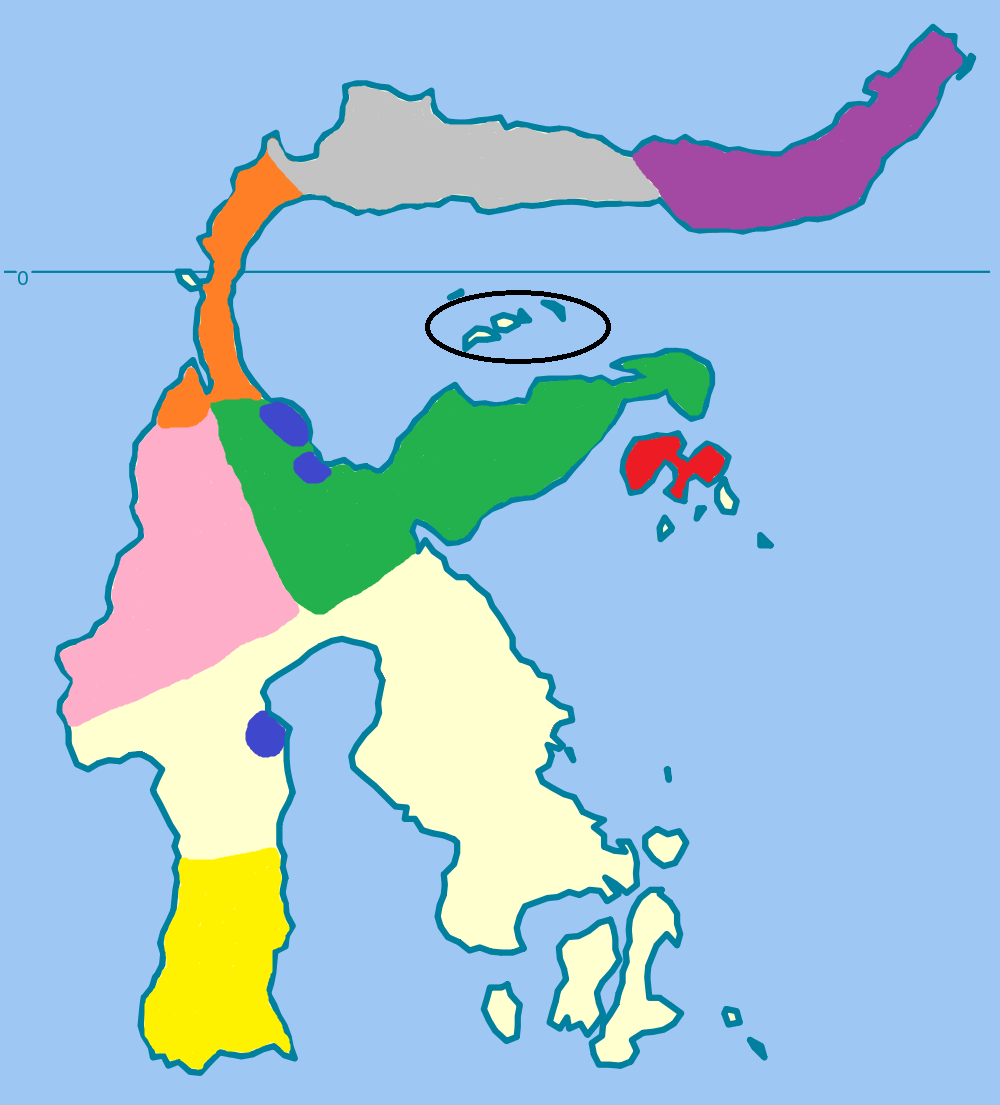
Distribution and range of Tarsius supriatnai and other tarsier species in Sulawesi, Indonesia: Dian's tarsier (Tarsius dentatus) Wallace's tarsier (Tarsius wallacei) Lariang tarsier (Tarsius lariang) Makassar tarsier (Tarsius fuscus) Pygmy tarsier (Tarsius pumilus) Peleng tarsier (Tarsius pelengensis) Gursky's spectral tarsier (Tarsius spectrumgurskyae) Jatna's tarsier (Tarsius supriatnai) Niemitz's tarsier (Tarsius niemitzi)

Aside from the common basal characteristics shared amongst all tarsier species (disproportionately enlarged eyes and ears, elongated tarsal bones, and the ability to rotate their heads 180 degrees in both directions), Jatna's tarsiers possess a very similar morphology to Gursky's spectral tarsiers, except with a generally larger bare spot at the base of its ear, a less shortened hind foot, a substantially longer tail, and longer middle finger.

While surveys of wild populations of Jatna's tarsier indicate that body weight and tail lengths are generally within the range of other tarsier species, body weight dimorphism between males and females may be greater than that of other tarsier species. Males weigh around 135 grams or 4.8 ounces while females weight around 104 to 114 grams (3.7 to 4.0 oz), while male tail lengths measure around 246 millimetres (9.7 in) and female tail lengths measure around 232 to 243 millimetres (9.1 to 9.6 in).

=== Distribution, range, and habitat ===
The species is endemic to the island of Sulawesi, Indonesia, specifically in the northern parts of the island stretching westwards from the isthmus of Gorontalo to Sejoli and possibly Ogatemuku. It borders with the Wallace's tarsier to the west, and the Gursky's spectral tarsier to the east.

In the wild, it inhabits tropical rainforests, preferring to nest in dense clusters of vegetation, such as on palm and bamboo trees from the Arecaceae and Poaceae plant families respectively. Common species of nesting trees include the Bambusa vulgaris, Schizostachyum lima, Calamus zollingeri, and Salacca Zalacca, while they have also been observed to nest on larger trees like Ficus virens.

=== Diet ===
Jatna's tarsiers are fully carnivorous, feeding mostly on insects like moths and crickets, and small vertebrates like lizards and frogs.

=== Duet calls ===
Jatna's tarsiers mostly live in monogamous pairs, and as nocturnal creatures, they perform territorial duet calls near dawn before returning to their nesting sites. These usually consist of a 2 to 5 note female phrase accompanied by male calls. They have been found to be significantly distinct from other similar species of tarsiers found within the region, with female notes being flatter and less modulated than other populations of tarsiers found further east around Manado.

== Conservation and status ==
=== Status ===
As of the latest assessments in 2020, Jatna's tarsiers have been classified as Vulnerable on the IUCN Red List of Threatened Species, with a decreasing population in the wild.

=== Habitat threats and adaptation ===
Threats to Jatna's tarsiers' habitats stem from the deforestation and degradation of their tropical rainforest habitats for logging, conversion to agricultural and plantation lands, as well as human settlement purposes, with estimates ranging 12% of its forest habitat lost between 2000 and 2017. However, studies have shown that the species are able to survive and adapt to a certain degree of habitat degradation and conversion, and discriminate between different types of cultivation. For instance, Jatna's tarsiers have been found inhabiting cocoa plantations, nesting among bamboo and rattan tree clusters or secondary forest fragments surrounding the plantation and making use of cocoa trees to support their locomotion. Nevertheless, population densities in such cocoa plantations are still significantly lower than population densities in untouched secondary forest, and hence cannot ascertain that they will be able to reproduce sufficiently in order to persist in cultivated areas.
