= Sulawesi lowland rain forests =

Ecoregion in Sulawesi, Indonesia

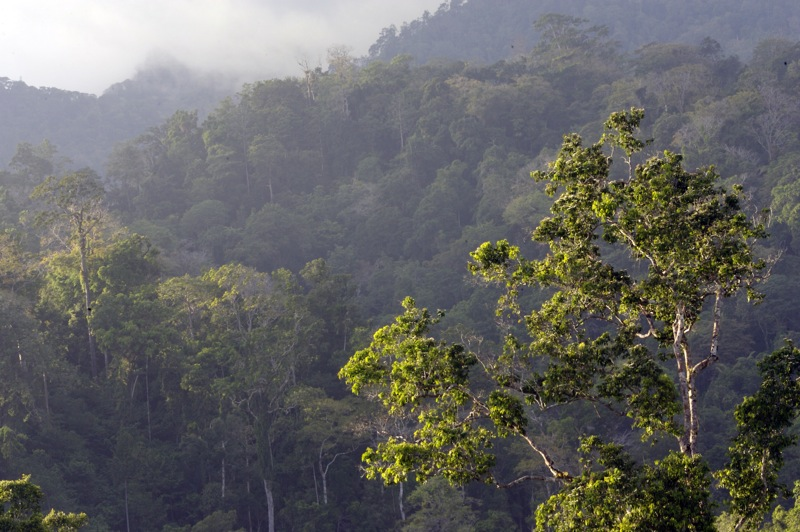
- Tangkoko Batuangus Nature Reserve, North Sulawesi

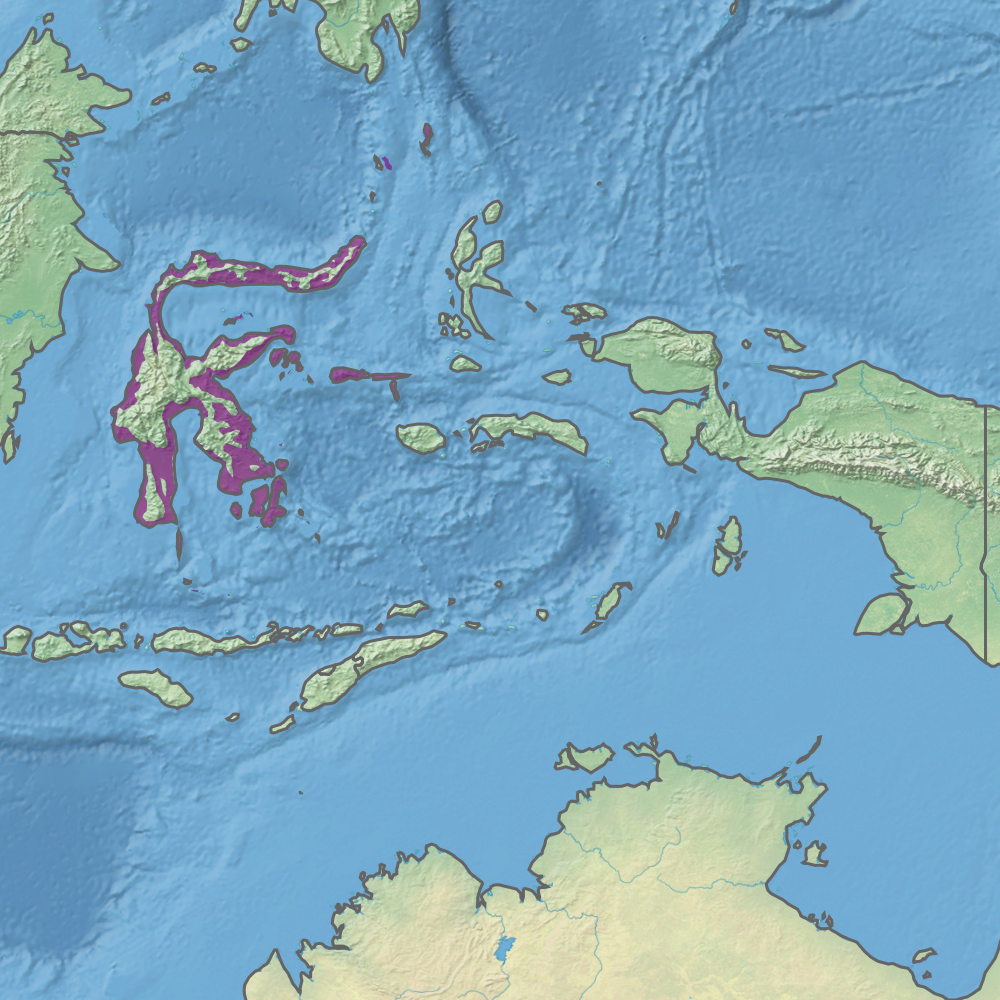
- Ecoregion territory (in purple)

Ecology
- Realm: Australasian realm
- Biome: tropical and subtropical moist broadleaf forests
- Borders: Sulawesi montane rain forests

Geography
- Area: 114,213 km^{2} (44,098 sq mi)
- Countries: Indonesia
- Province: Central Sulawesi; Gorontalo; North Maluku; North Sulawesi; South Sulawesi; Southeast Sulawesi, West Sulawesi
- Coordinates: 4°S 122.2°E

Conservation
- Conservation status: critical/endangered
- Global 200: Sulawesi moist forests
- Protected: 8,427 km² (7%)

The Sulawesi lowland rain forests is a tropical moist forest ecoregion in Indonesia. The ecoregion includes the lowlands of Sulawesi and neighboring islands.

== Geography ==
Sulawesi is the largest island in the ecoregion, with an area of 180,681 km^{2}. Sulawesi is the fourth-largest island in Indonesia, and the eleventh-largest in the world. The ecoregion includes many neighboring islands, including the Banggai and Sula Islands to the east, the Sangihe Islands and Talaud Islands to the north, the islands of Buton and Muna to the southeast, and the Selayar Islands to the south. Sulawesi and the other islands are mountainous.

The islands that make up the ecoregion are part of Wallacea, a group of islands that are part of the Australasian realm, but were never joined to either the Australian or Asian continents. The islands of Wallacea are home to a mix of plants and animals from both terrestrial realms, and have many unique species that evolved in isolation. The Makassar Strait separates Sulawesi from Borneo to the west. The strait is part of the Wallace Line, which demarcates the western boundary of Wallacea. Borneo and other Indonesian islands west of Sulawesi are part of Sundaland, and were connected to the Asian continent when sea levels were lower during the ice ages.

The mountains of Sulawesi above 1000 meters elevation are part of the separate Sulawesi montane rain forests ecoregion.

== Climate ==
The ecoregion has a tropical wet or rain forest climate.

== Flora ==
The main plant communities are tropical lowland evergreen rain forest, and semi-evergreen rain forest, seasonally-dry monsoon forests at the tip of the southeast peninsula, and areas of freshwater swamp forest and peat swamp forest.

== Fauna ==
The ecoregion is home to 104 mammal species, of which 29 are endemic or near-endemic to the ecoregion.

Larger mammals include three pigs, the Celebes warty pig (Sus celebensis) the North Sulawesi babirusa (Babyrousa celebensis), and Togian babirusa (Babyrousa togeanensis). The Celebes warty pig lives in the lower lowland and lower montane rain forests of Sulawesi and other islands of Wallacea. The North Sulawesi babirusa lives in both the lowland and montane rain forests of northern and central Sulawesi. The Togian babirusa lives only on the Togian Islands, which lie in the Gulf of Tomini between Sulawesi's northern and eastern peninsulas.

The endemic lowland anoa (Bubalus depressicornis) is a dwarf buffalo which stands only 90 cm (35 in) high. The Celebes rusa deer (Rusa timorensis macassaricus) is a subspecies of the Javan rusa, which may have been introduced from Sundaland to Sulawesi by humans in ancient times.

There are three endemic marsupials in the ecoregion, the Banggai cuscus (Strigocuscus pelengensis) which is endemic to the Banggai and Sula islands, the Sulawesi dwarf cuscus (Strigocuscus celebensis), and the Sulawesi bear cuscus (Ailurops ursinus), which lives in the lowlands of Sulawesi, Muna, Buton, and the Banggai and Togian islands.

There are three endemic macaque species on Sulawesi. The Celebes crested macaque (Macaca nigra) lives in both the lowland and montane forests. The Moor macaque (Macaca maura) is endemic to the south peninsula. The Booted macaque (Macaca ochreata) is endemic to the southeast peninsula, Muna, and Buton. Sulawesi's tarsiers include many endemics – the Makassar tarsier (Tarsius fuscus) from southwestern Sulawesi, Gursky’s spectral tarsier (Tarsius spectrumgurskyae) and Jatna's tarsier (Tarsius supriatnai) from the northern peninsula, spectral tarsier (Tarsius spectrum) from Selayar, and Peleng tarsier (Tarsius pelengensis) of Peleng Island in the Banggai Islands.

There are two endemic bats, Acerodon humilis and Neopteryx frosti, and eleven endemic species of Murid rodents: Rattus koopmani, Rattus bontanus, Rattus elaphinus, Maxomys hellwaldii, Haeromys minahassae, Margaretamys beccarii, Taeromys celebensis, Taeromys punicans, Taeromys taerae, Echiothrix leucura, and Melomys caurinus.

Eight other mammals are Sulawesi endemics, and live in both the lowland and montane forest ecoregions: the Sulawesi palm civet (Macrogalidia musschenbroekii), Elongated shrew (Crocidura elongata), Sulawesi shrew (Crocidura lea), Sulawesi tiny shrew (Crocidura levicula), Crested roundleaf bat (Hipposideros inexpectatus), Minahassa pipistrelle (Pipistrellus minahassae), Gaskell's false serotine (Hesperoptenus gaskelli), and Yellow-tailed rat (Rattus xanthurus).

The ecoregion is home to 337 bird species. 70 species are endemic or near-endemic to the ecoregion.

The ecoregion covers several Endemic Bird Areas (EBAs). The Sulawesi EBA includes both the lowland and montane rain forest ecoregions on Sulawesi. Other EBAs in the ecoregion are Sangihe and Talaud, Banggai and Sulu Islands, and Salayar and Bonerate Islands.

=== Extinct fauna ===
Sulawesi was home to Celebochoerus, a giant pig, and Stegodonts, relatives of the elephant. Both went extinct in the Pleistocene.

== Protected areas ==
A 2017 assessment found that 8,427 km^{2}, or 7%, of the ecoregion is in protected areas. Approximately three-quarters of the unprotected area is still forested.

== See also ==
- Protected areas of Indonesia
