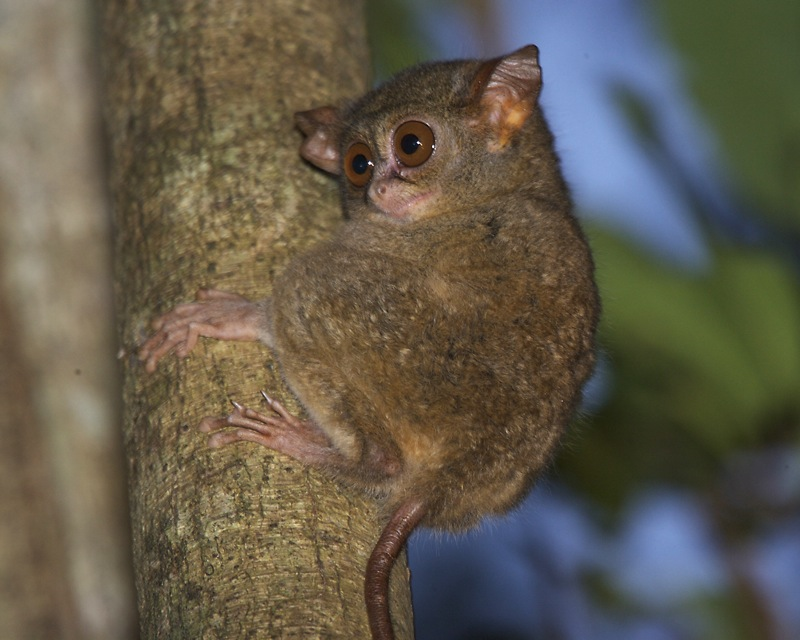
- Gursky's spectral tarsier

Scientific classification
- Kingdom: Animalia
- Phylum: Chordata
- Class: Mammalia
- Order: Primates
- Family: Tarsiidae
- Genus: Tarsius; Storr, 1780

Type species
- Lemur tarsier Erxleben, 1777

Species
- T. dentatus; T. lariang; T. niemitzi; T. pelengensis; T. pumilus; T. sangirensis; T. tarsier; T. tumpara; T. wallacei; T. fuscus; T. spectrumgurskyae; T. supriatnai; †T. eocaenus; †T. sirindhornae
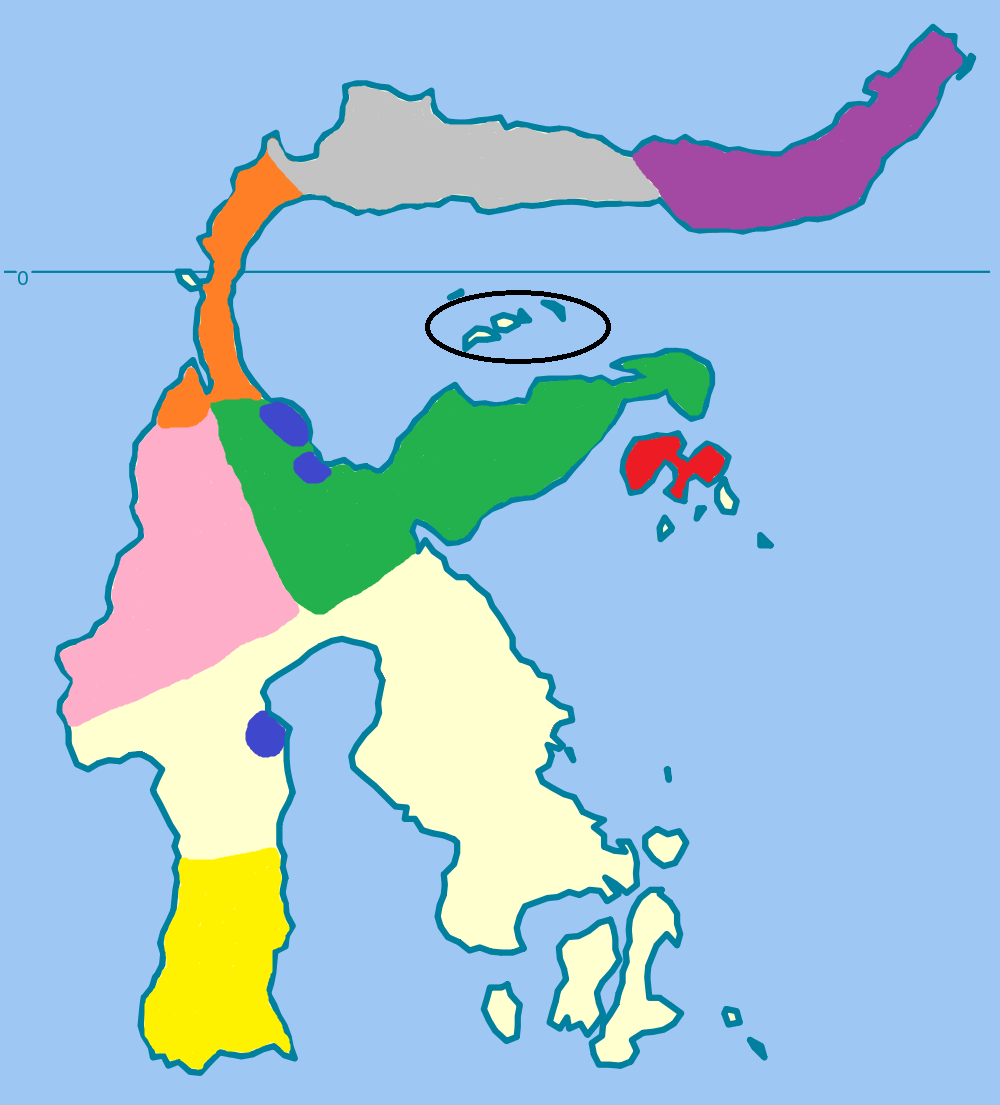
- Distribution and range of Tarsius supriatnai and other tarsier species in Sulawesi, Indonesia: Tarsius dentatus Tarsius wallacei Tarsius lariang Tarsius fuscus Tarsius pumilus Tarsius pelengensis Tarsius spectrumgurskyae Tarsius supriatnai Tarsius niemitzi

= Tarsius =

Tarsius Temporal range: 48.6–0 Ma Eocene to recent

Genus of primates

Tarsius is a genus of tarsiers, small primates native to islands of Maritime Southeast Asia, with almost all of its species found on Sulawesi Island. Until 2010, all tarsier species were typically assigned to this genus, but a revision of the family Tarsiidae restored the generic status of Cephalopachus and created a new genus Carlito.

All members of Tarsius are found on Sulawesi, while Cephalopachus is found on Sundaland and Carlito in Greater Mindanao.

== Species ==
Genus Tarsius – Storr, 1780 – twelve species
| Common name | Scientific name and subspecies | Range | Size and ecology | IUCN status and estimated population |
|---|---|---|---|---|
| Dian's tarsier | T. dentatus Miller & Hollister, 1921 | Central Sulawesi, Indonesia | Size: 11–12 cm (4–5 in) long, plus 13–28 cm (5–11 in) tail Habitat: Forest Diet: Insects, as well as small vertebrates | VU Unknown |
| Gursky's spectral tarsier | T. spectrumgurskyae Shekelle, Groves, Maryanto & Mittermeier, 2017 | Northeastern Sulawesi (in purple) | Size: About 14 cm (6 in) long, plus 21–27 cm (8–11 in) tail Habitat: Forest Diet: Insects, as well as small vertebrates | VU Unknown |
| Jatna's tarsier | T. supriatnai Shekelle, Groves, Maryanto & Mittermeier, 2017 | Northern Sulawesi (in gray) | Size: About 14 cm (6 in) long, plus 23–25 cm (9–10 in) tail Habitat: Forest Diet: Insects, as well as small vertebrates | VU Unknown |
| Lariang tarsier | T. lariang Groves & Merker, 2006 | Central Sulawesi | Size: About 12 cm (5 in) long, plus 12–21 cm (5–8 in) tail Habitat: Forest Diet: Insects, as well as small vertebrates | DD Unknown |
| Makassar tarsier | T. fuscus Fischer von Waldheim, 1804 | Southern Sulawesi (in yellow) | Size: 12–13 cm (5 in) long, plus 24–26 cm (9–10 in) tail Habitat: Forest and caves Diet: Insects, as well as small vertebrates | VU Unknown |
| Niemitz's tarsier | T. niemitzi Shekelle, Groves, Maryanto, Mittermeier, Salim & Springer, 2019 | Northern Sulawesi (circled in black) | Size: About 14 cm (6 in) long, plus 24–26 cm (9–10 in) tail Habitat: Forest Diet: Insects, as well as small vertebrates | EN 10,000–20,000 |
| Peleng tarsier | T. pelengensis Sody, 1949 | Eastern Sulawesi | Size: 12–14 cm (5–6 in) long, plus 25–27 cm (10–11 in) tail Habitat: Forest Diet: Insects, as well as frogs, lizards, and other small vertebrates | EN Unknown |
| Pygmy tarsier | T. pumilus Miller, Hollister, 1921 | Central Sulawesi | Size: 8–11 cm (3–4 in) long, plus 20–21 cm (8 in) tail Habitat: Forest Diet: Arthropods and insects, as well as small vertebrates | EN Unknown |
| Sangihe tarsier | T. sangirensis Meyer, 1897 | Sangir Island, southeastern Philippines | Size: 12–13 cm (5 in) long, plus about 30 cm (12 in) tail Habitat: Forest and inland wetlands Diet: Insects, as well as birds, lizards, and other small vertebrates | EN Unknown |
| Siau Island tarsier | T. tumpara Shekelle, Groves, Merker & Supriatna, 2008 | Siau Island, north of Sulawesi | Size: 10–15 cm (4–6 in) long, plus about 20 cm (8 in) tail Habitat: Forest Diet: Arthropods, as well as small vertebrates | CR Unknown |
| Spectral tarsier | T. tarsier (Erxleben, 1777) | Sulawesi | Size: 9–14 cm (4–6 in) long, plus 20–26 cm (8–10 in) tail Habitat: Forest Diet: Insects, as well as lizards, bats, and other small vertebrates | VU Unknown |
| Wallace's tarsier | T. wallacei Merker, Driller, Dahruddin, Wirdateti, Sinaga, Perwitasari-Farajallah & Shekelle, 2010 | Northern Sulawesi (in orange) | Size: 11–13 cm (4–5 in) long, plus 23–27 cm (9–11 in) tail Habitat: Forest and inland wetlands Diet: Insects, as well as small vertebrates | VU Unknown |

As of 2018, Fossilworks also recognizes the following additional extinct species:

- †Tarsius eocaenus Beard et al., 1994
- †Tarsius sirindhornae Chaimanee et al., 2011

== Sources ==
- Groves, Colin P. (2005). Wilson, Don E.; Reeder, DeeAnn M. (eds.). Mammal Species of the World. Vol. 1 (3rd ed.). Johns Hopkins University Press. ISBN 978-0-8018-8221-0.
- Supriatna, Jatna (2022). Field Guide to the Primates of Indonesia. Springer Nature. ISBN 978-3-03-083206-3.
