= Wallace's tarsier =

Conservation status
- Vulnerable (IUCN 3.1)

Scientific classification
- Kingdom: Animalia
- Phylum: Chordata
- Class: Mammalia
- Infraclass: Placentalia
- Order: Primates
- Family: Tarsiidae
- Genus: Tarsius
- Species: T. wallacei

Binomial name
- Tarsius wallacei Merker et al. 2010

Species of primate

Wallace's tarsier (Tarsius wallacei), is a species of Sulawesi tarsier (all tarsiers from the genus Tarsius are from Sulawesi and its surrounding islands). It is found in the forests of what is referred to geologically as the neck of Sulawesi in Central Sulawesi. It is a small brown arboreal primate of the infraorder Tarsiiformes less than 15 cm (6 in) long. Locally in Kaili-Da'a dialect it is called Tangkasi, while in Kaili-Ledo dialect, it is called Toga.

== Taxonomy ==
Wallace's tarsier was first described as T. wallacei by Stefan Merker et al. in 2010, the type locality being about 9 km (6 mi) south of Palu, the capital of Central Sulawesi, near the village of Uwemanje. There are two separate populations which are morphologically similar but differ in the size of the animal. The new species was named in honour of the British naturalist, Alfred Russel Wallace.

== Description ==
Wallace's tarsier is similar in size and appearance to other lowland tarsiers and has a head-and-body length of between 10 and 15 cm (4 and 6 in). It is larger than the pygmy tarsier (Tarsius pumilus). It has large eyes, a clearly defined facial-mask, white spots behind its ears and a long tail with a large bushy tail-tuft. Its fur is yellowish-brown and its throat is copper-coloured. Although morphologically similar to other species of tarsier found on Sulawesi, it has a distinctive duetting call, and genetic analysis shows that its mitochondrial and Y-chromosomal DNA sequences, and its microsatellite allele frequencies, are unique.

== Distribution and habitat ==
Wallace's tarsier is endemic to Central Sulawesi in Indonesia, specifically Sigi Regency, Donggala Regency, and Parigi Moutong Regency. There are two separate populations, northern and southern, separated by Palu Bay, city of Palu, and southern parts of the Isthmus of Palu, the area which is inhabited by Dian's tarsier. The southern population occupies an area of approximately 50 km^{2} (19 mi^{2}) around the Kaili-Da'a village of Uwemanje in Sigi. This tarsier is arboreal and is found in both primary and secondary forest and in degraded areas.

== Status ==
Wallace's tarsier has a limited range, especially the southern form. The total population is unknown but is thought to be decreasing as forest is cleared to make way for plantation crops. The International Union for Conservation of Nature has rated it as "vulnerable". The northern population includes the Gunung Sojol Nature Reserve within its range. However, the southern population has such a small range that any setback to the population could have a high impact.
