= Tarsius sirindhornae =

Tarsius sirindhornae Temporal range: Middle Miocene

Scientific classification
- Kingdom: Animalia
- Phylum: Chordata
- Class: Mammalia
- Infraclass: Placentalia
- Order: Primates
- Family: Tarsiidae
- Genus: Tarsius
- Species: †T. sirindhornae

Binomial name
- †Tarsius sirindhornae Chaimanee et al., 2011

Extinct species of primate

Tarsius sirindhornae is an extinct species of Tarsius that lived during the Middle Miocene.

== Distribution ==
Tarsius sirindhornae fossils are known from the Na Khaem Formation of Thailand.
