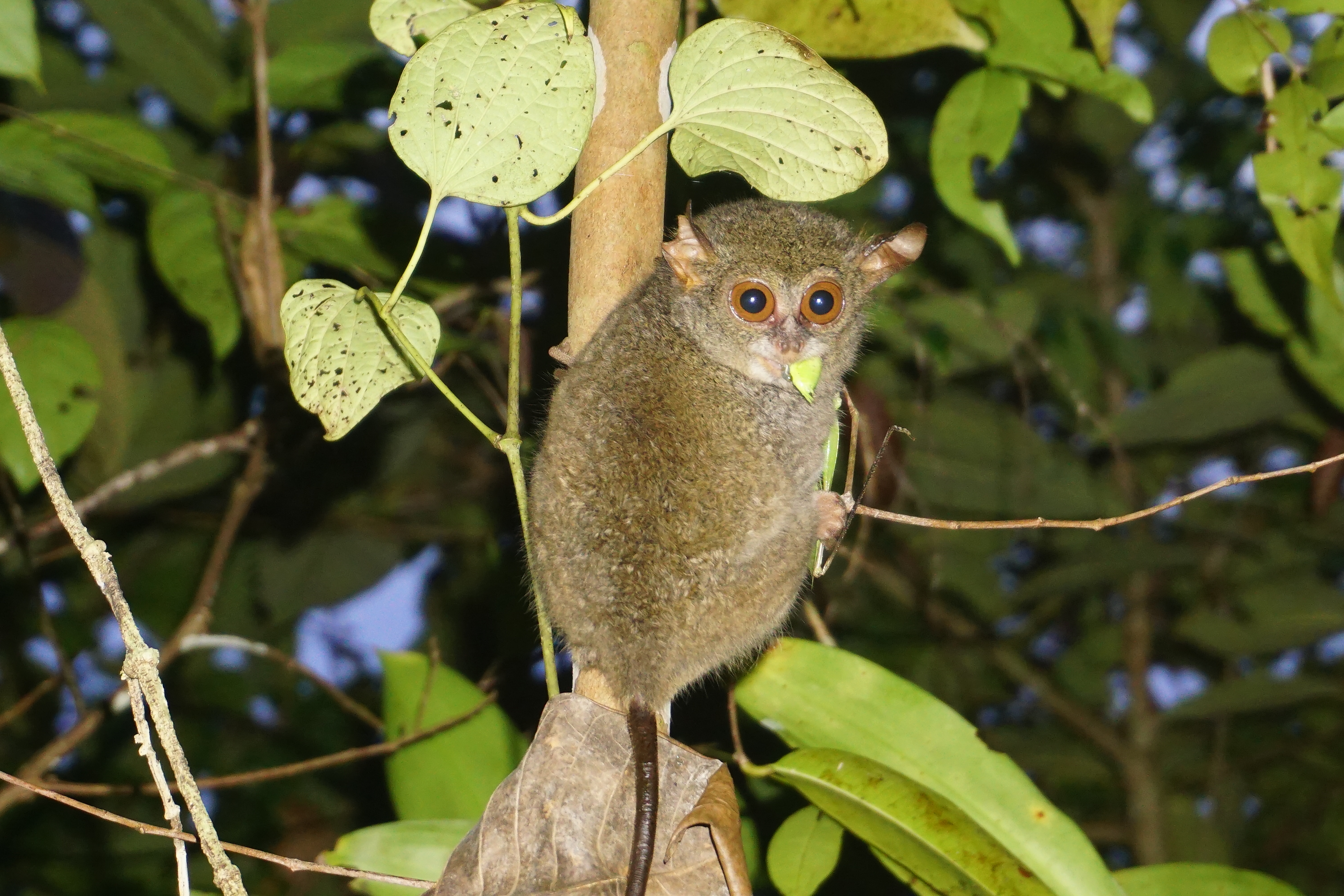

Conservation status
- Endangered (IUCN 3.1)

Scientific classification
- Kingdom: Animalia
- Phylum: Chordata
- Class: Mammalia
- Infraclass: Placentalia
- Order: Primates
- Family: Tarsiidae
- Genus: Tarsius
- Species: T. pelengensis

Binomial name
- Tarsius pelengensis Sody, 1949
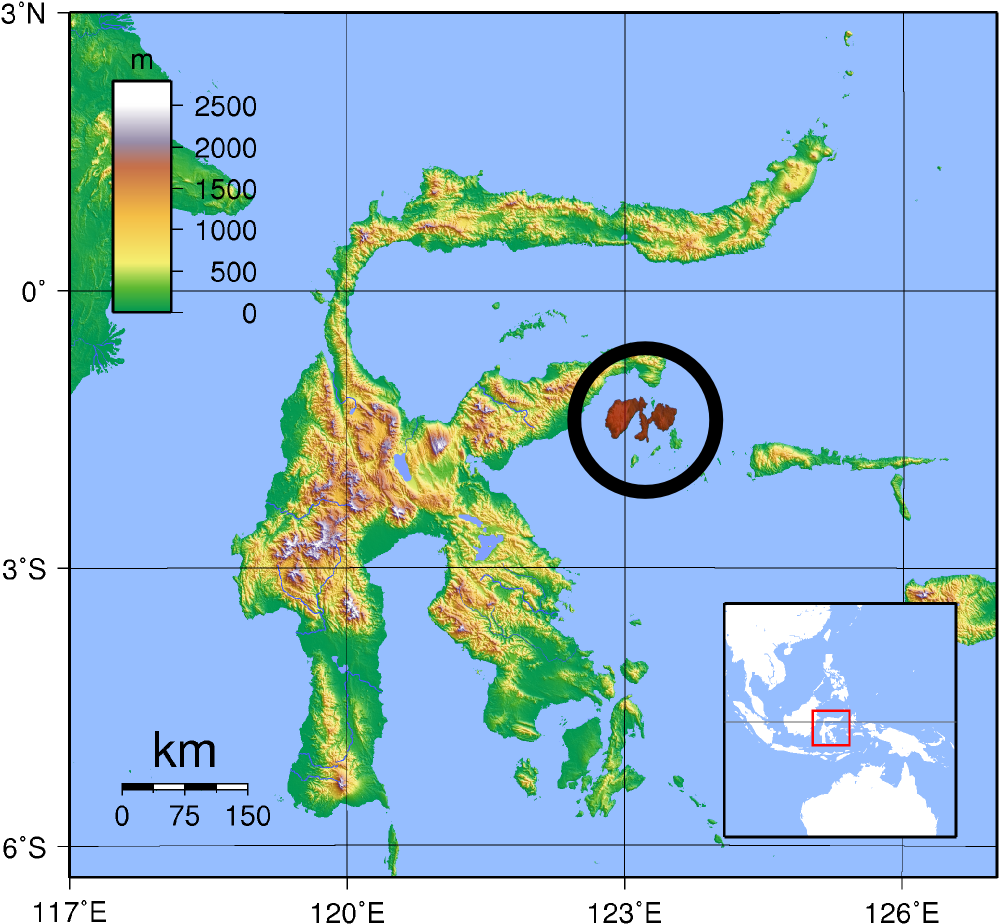
- Range of the Peleng tarsier

= Peleng tarsier =

Species of primate

The Peleng tarsier (Tarsius pelengensis), or the Peleng Island tarsier, is a nocturnal primate found on the island of Peleng, just east of Sulawesi, Indonesia. In western Peleng, the animal is called Lakasinding, while in the east, Siling.

== Description ==
Tarsiers are small, agile primates, adapted for climbing, leaping and foraging at night. They have long fingers and toes with gripping pads, large eyes, large ears and greyish fur. The body is about 12.5 cm (5 in) long, with a tail double this length. The adult weight is generally between 100 and 140 g (3.5 and 4.9 oz), with males tending to be slightly larger than females.

== Distribution and habitat ==
The Peleng tarsier is endemic to the island of Peleng, off the east coast of Sulawesi, and it may also be present on other smaller islands of the Banggai Archipelago. The natural habitat of this tarsier is primary forest; however, illegal logging and forest clearance has reduced the primary forest of the island to about 9% of its original extent. Little is known about the habitat requirement for this species, but other tarsier species have been found in secondary forest, or other non-primary habitat, so it seems likely that the Peleng tarsier can occupy similar habitat. Secondary forest occupies about 63% of the island, making 72% of the surface area potentially providing suitable habitat.

== Ecology ==
Tarsiers are social and tend to live in family groups with a home range. They are carnivorous, feeding on insects, spiders and other small arthropods as well as small vertebrates. During the day they sleep in concealed locations in tangled vegetation a few metres off the ground, emerging at dusk to forage during the night.

Like other tarsiers, this species can turn its head through almost 180 degrees in each direction, much like an owl. Breeding pairs communicate by making characteristic duetting calls. Due to the great similarity of these calls to those of Dian's tarsier (Tarsius dentatus), the two species are thought to be closely related. Studies of the calls of tarsiers on Sulawesi and the surrounding islands enable cryptic species to be distinguished from one another, and indicate that there may be four as yet undescribed species.
