= Lariang tarsier =

Conservation status
- Data Deficient (IUCN 3.1)

Scientific classification
- Kingdom: Animalia
- Phylum: Chordata
- Class: Mammalia
- Infraclass: Placentalia
- Order: Primates
- Family: Tarsiidae
- Genus: Tarsius
- Species: T. lariang

Binomial name
- Tarsius lariang Merker & Groves, 2006
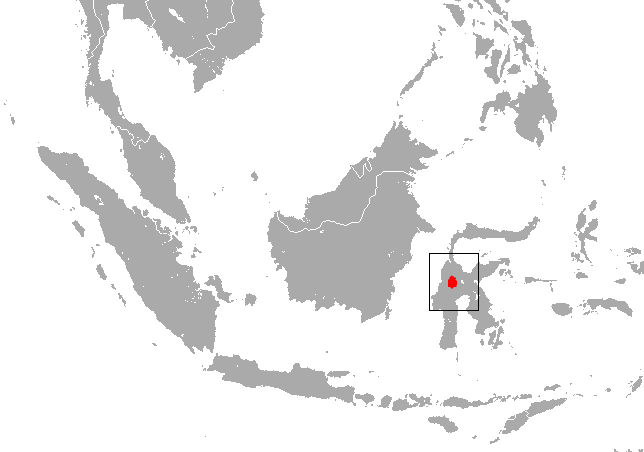
- Lariang tarsier range

Species of primate

The Lariang tarsier (Tarsius lariang) is a recently described tarsier occurring in the western part of the central core of Sulawesi. Six museum specimens of this species are known, two of which have been misidentified as the pygmy tarsier before their correct identity came out. This species has been named after the Lariang River, an important river in the part of Sulawesi where this species occurs.

This species has darker fur than the other Sulawesi tarsiers. The dorsal fur is greyish brown. The blackish tail ends in a dark pencil-like point. There is a clearly discernible dark ring around the eyes. The third digit on the hands is very long. It is the second-largest tarsier; only the Sangihe tarsier is larger; published body weights are 67 to 117 g.

== Description ==
The Lariang tarsier (T. lariang) is portrayed by its dark grey-buff pelage, thick black pencil-like tail, finely marked black paranasal stripes, along with the form of black eye rims that distinguish it from its neighbor to the east (Tarsius dianae). They are missing brown tones on their thighs and have a small bald spot at the base of their ear. To determine them from other Sulawesi mainland tarsiers they are distinguished to have a longer third middle finger. However, it is also the largest of the Sulawesi tarsiers.

== Distribution ==
The distribution of T. lariang is either allopatric or parapatric with no occurrence of the species being sympatric. They are found only on the eastern Indonesian island of Sulawesi. Their range includes from Palu Bay to Makassar Strait to Lore-Lindu National Park. Populations of T. lariang occur on both sides of the Lariang River. It mostly inhabits the northern part of Western Sulawesi while bordering its congener Tarsius dentatus along the Palu-Koro fault. This species is strictly endemic to the regions of Central and West Sulawesi.

== Etymology ==
The species scientific name Tarsius lariang references their distribution along the landmark of the Lariang River in Sulawesi, a major study region for this species of tarsier.

== Diet ==
The Lariang tarsiers are obligate faunivores with the main part of their diet consisting of insects. They would be considered strictly insectivores if it were not for their occasional interest in eating lizards such as house geckos, snakes, birds, and even bats. Crickets make up most of the tarsiers diet because of their great abundance and availability. Tarsiers are known to consume about 10% of their body weight daily, which translates to around 15.4 g of food per day. They do prefer a more varied diet. Scientists have found that if fed crickets for a long period of time they start to reject them and seek a different prey item. Their preference of a prey item increases as the availability of the item decreases. Tarsiers usually ambush their prey on the forest floors with vertical perches of about 0.5-1.0 m high. They tend to catch prey items that could more easily escape first, leaving the easier catch for last. They are nocturnal so the majority of their hunting occurs at night.

== Reproduction and social groups ==
Lariang tarsiers have a monogamous or facultative polygamous social system. Extrapair mating is assumed to be used to avoid interbreeding. Adult males and females often pair and mate for life, but the male will often leave later on and this involves extrapair mating. They tend to live in small groups and exhibit social and territorial behaviors. Social groups tend to share the same sleeping sites and have a vocal system of daily duet calls within their groups. Social groups are usually composed of one adult male, one adult female along with their offspring.

All species of tarsiers have a gestation period of around six months or about 190 days. Females usually consume double their body weight around the third trimester. They give birth to only one young that are born with fur and their eyes open already. They can also climb right after they are born. Tarsiers are among the largest mammals when newborn, relative to their mother's body size.

== Phylogeny ==
The tarsier lineage is known to have split from other primate lineages around 58 mya, but it could very well be much earlier. Scientists have discovered tarsiid fossils from Asia dating from the Eocene to the Miocene. Multivariate analyses have shown the T. lariang is significantly distinct from other species of Sulawesi tarsiers. The isolation of the Sulawesi islands archipelago (before they became one big island), due to a period of plate tectonic activity about 20 mya resulted in speciation of the species of Sulawesi tarsiers. Lariang tarsiers most likely colonized Sulawesi region around the Miocene. Scientists have found that the estimated split between T. dentatus and T. lariang to have taken place around 1.4 mya.
