= Pygmy tarsier =

Conservation status
- Endangered (IUCN 3.1)

Scientific classification
- Kingdom: Animalia
- Phylum: Chordata
- Class: Mammalia
- Order: Primates
- Family: Tarsiidae
- Genus: Tarsius
- Species: T. pumilus

Binomial name
- Tarsius pumilus Miller & Hollister, 1921
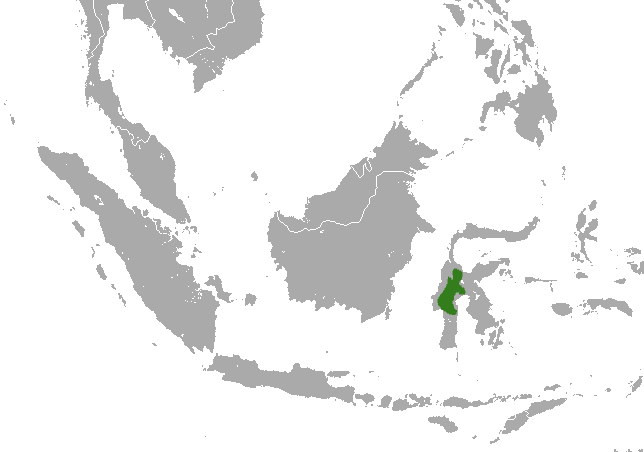
- Pygmy tarsier range

Species of primate

The pygmy tarsier (Tarsius pumilus), also known as the mountain tarsier or the lesser spectral tarsier, is a nocturnal primate found in Central Sulawesi, Indonesia. The pygmy tarsier is elusive, only inhabiting highland habitats such as moss forests and being difficult to locate even by experienced tarsier biologists.

For decades it was only known from two specimens; it was believed they were either an aberrant montane form of the Tarsius tarsier complex or a species that had gone extinct in the early 20th century. In 2000, a third specimen was recovered, accidentally killed in a snap-trap. The first pygmy tarsiers seen alive since the 1920s were found by a research team led by Dr. Sharon Gursky and PhD student Nanda Grow from Texas A&M University on Mount Rore Katimbo in Lore Lindu National Park in August 2008. The two males and single female (a fourth escaped) were captured using nets, and were radio collared to track their movements. As the first live pygmy tarsiers seen in 80-plus years, these captures dispelled the belief among some primatologists that the species was extinct.

== Description ==
The pygmy tarsier has a head-body length of 95 to 105 mm (3.7 to 4.1 in), and weighs 55 g (1.9 oz) on average; it is smaller and lighter than other tarsier species, only being 75% the size of other Tarsius species in linear measurements. Likewise, its ears are also smaller than those of the rest of genus Tarsius. Its fur is tan or buff with predominant grey or brownish red coloring. Its tail is heavily haired and ranges from 135 to 275 mm (5.3 to 10.8 in), and functions in balance when leaping. The pygmy tarsier has nails on all five digits of each hand and on two digits of each foot. The claw-like nails aid in its grasping strength and are also used as an aid in its need for vertical support for feeding and movement. Pygmy tarsiers exhibit low sexual dimorphism, so both sexes are similar in size and appearance.

The most noticeable feature of the pygmy tarsier are its large eyes, which are about 16 mm (0.63 in) in diameter. Unlike other nocturnal species, tarsiers lack a tapetum lucidum due to the diurnal evolutionary history of primates. To make up for this, tarsiers have evolved their large eyes to maximize available light. Tarsiers eyes cannot move in their sockets, but their necks have the ability to turn their heads almost 360 degrees.

== Habitat ==
The pygmy tarsier is endemic to the mossy cloud forests of central Sulawesi, Indonesia and found at altitudes of 1,800–2,200 m (5,900–7,200 ft). The canopy of the mountain forests are low in height and undergrowth is much denser than the lowland forests. The plant diversity is low and covered in thick mosses, resulting in decreased habitat productivity. Pygmy Tarsiers handle this challenging habitat by living at the edge of forests where prey is more abundant.

== Biology ==
The pygmy tarsier is nocturnal or crepuscular, and is mainly arboreal. It spends most of the daylight hours sleeping on vertical branches in the canopy. T. pumilus is not a nest builder. Unlike other tarsier species, it does not use scent glands to mark territorial boundaries. Tactile communication and interaction is important with the pygmy tarsier, as in other tarsier species. The pygmy tarsier lives in stable bonded pairs, remaining together for up to 15 months. This stable pair bond is usually monogamous. Some species of tarsier have recently been found to communicate at ultrasonic frequencies of around 70 kHz on the islands of Bohol and Leyte. The ultrasonic range of their communication is well beyond what may be detected by the human ear and is a distinct advantage to keeping their communication species-specific.

Pygmy tarsiers are insectivorous, feeding primarily on arthropods. Due to their arboreal lifestyle, their diet consists of airborne insects found in the forest canopy such as moths, grasshoppers, and katydids.

The species has two breeding seasons, one at the beginning of the rainy season and the other at the end, separated by about 6 months. Gestation lasts 178 days on average, and births occur in May and from November to December. Infants are quite precocial, and develop quickly, similar to others in the genus. The offspring begin traveling with the group after only 23 days of age, and begin capturing their own prey around 42 days. Young females remain with their parents until adulthood, while young males leave the natal group as juveniles.
