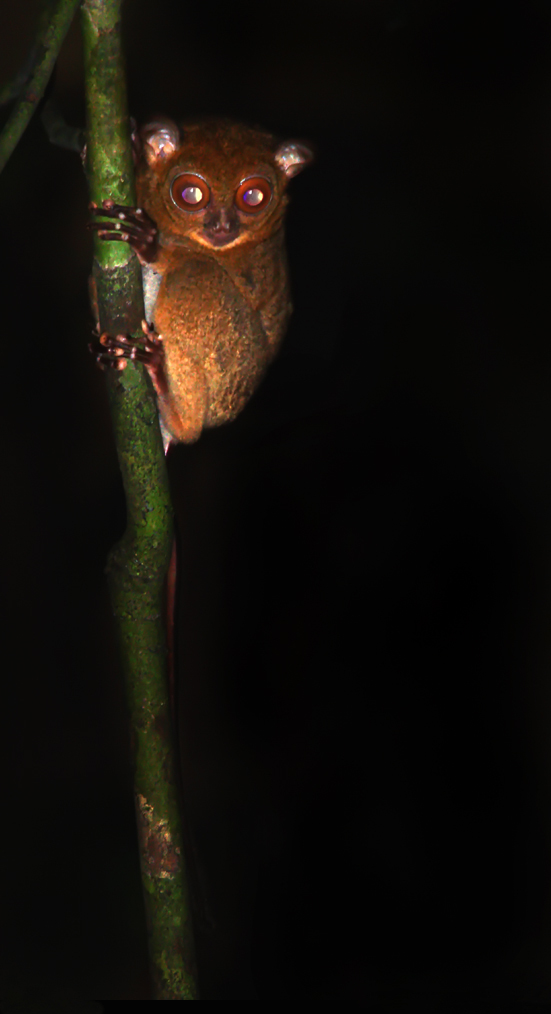
- C. bancanus in Borneo. Note the eyeshine.

Conservation status
- Vulnerable (IUCN 3.1)

Scientific classification
- Kingdom: Animalia
- Phylum: Chordata
- Class: Mammalia
- Infraclass: Placentalia
- Order: Primates
- Family: Tarsiidae
- Genus: Cephalopachus; Swainson, 1835
- Species: C. bancanus

Binomial name
- Cephalopachus bancanus (Horsfield, 1821)
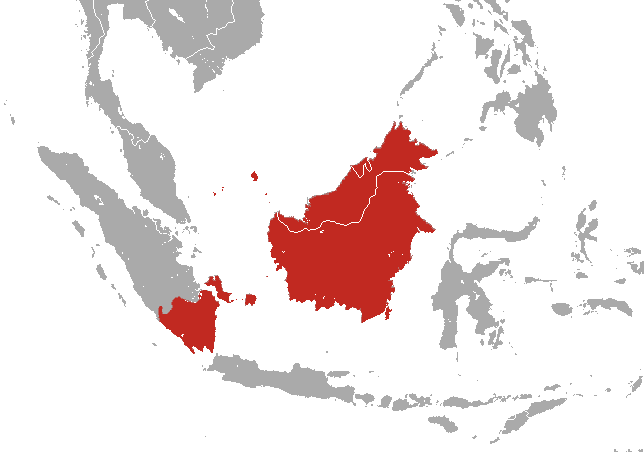
- Western tarsier range

Synonyms
- Tarsius bancanus Horsfield, 1821

= Horsfield's tarsier =

Western tarsier

Species of primate

Horsfield's tarsier (Cephalopachus bancanus) is the only species of tarsier in the genus Cephalopachus. Named by American naturalist Thomas Horsfield, it is also referred to as western tarsier. The species occurs on Borneo, Sumatra and nearby islands and is, like other members of the group, entirely nocturnal.

== Taxonomy ==
Although Horsfield's tarsier was usually placed in the genus Tarsius with all other living tarsiers, it is quite distinct from the Philippine tarsier and the various tarsiers of Sulawesi and nearby islands; therefore, scientists have placed it in a separate genus, Cephalopachus.

The taxonomy of this species is in doubt, with some subspecies considered unsure. In fact, over 20 years few studies have been done on C. bancanus and a taxonomic revision based upon intensive and systematic field surveys is overdue. The IUCN believes that these subspecies should be treated as distinct and named as separate taxa until more definitive evidence is available. When splitting the species into its own genus, Colin Groves and Myron Shekelle recognized the natunensis population as a distinct subspecies.

There are four recognized subspecies of Horsfield's tarsier:

- Cephalopachus bancanus bancanus — Bangka Island tarsier
- Cephalopachus bancanus saltator — Belitung Island tarsier
- Cephalopachus bancanus borneanus — Bornean tarsier
- Cephalopachus bancanus natunensis — Natuna Islands tarsier

== Habitat and distribution ==
Horsfield's tarsier is found in Southern Sumatra, Borneo and nearby islands. The Bornean subspecies, C. b. borneanus, is known from many lowland sites in Sabah, Brunei, Sarawak and West Kalimantan and above 900 m (3,000 ft) in the Kelabit uplands in northern Sarawak. Other records show it from Kutai and Peleben in East Kalimantan and Tanjung Maruwe in Central Kalimantan. This species can live in both primary and secondary forests, and it also lives in forests along the coasts or on the edge of plantations.

== Physical description ==
The pelage coloration ranges from pale olive or reddish brown to pale or dark grey-brown, possibly varying with age. Based on 12 collected specimens, the head to body measurement range from 121–154 mm (4.8–6.1 in). Horsfield's tarsier has an extremely long tail which can reach 181 to 224 mm (7.1 to 8.8 in) and is hairless except for tufts of hair at the end. This species has two grooming claws on each foot. The fingers are very long and have pads on the tips. The toes have flattened nails except for the second and third toes on hind feet, which bear claw-like nails.

It has large eyes which do not reflect light. The membranous ears are slender and almost bare. The molars of this species have high-cusps and are almost tritubercular. The dental formula of Horsfield's tarsier is 2:1:3:3 on the upper jaw and 1:1:3:3 on the lower jaw.

== Biology ==
Horsfield's tarsiers are nocturnal, sleeping alone during the day in a tangle of vines or lianas at a height of 3.5 to 5 metres (11 to 16 ft). This species prefers to sleep, rest, or remain stationary on perches that are angled 5 degrees from the vertical tree trunks, 1 to 4 cm (0.39 to 1.57 in) in diameter, and it sleeps solitarily. Before sunset, Horsfield's tarsier will wake up and wait 10 to 20 minutes before moving around the understory and spending 1.5 to 2 hours of the night foraging for food. Horsfield's tarsier can be found from ground level up to a height of 7 m (23 ft) or more in the understory.

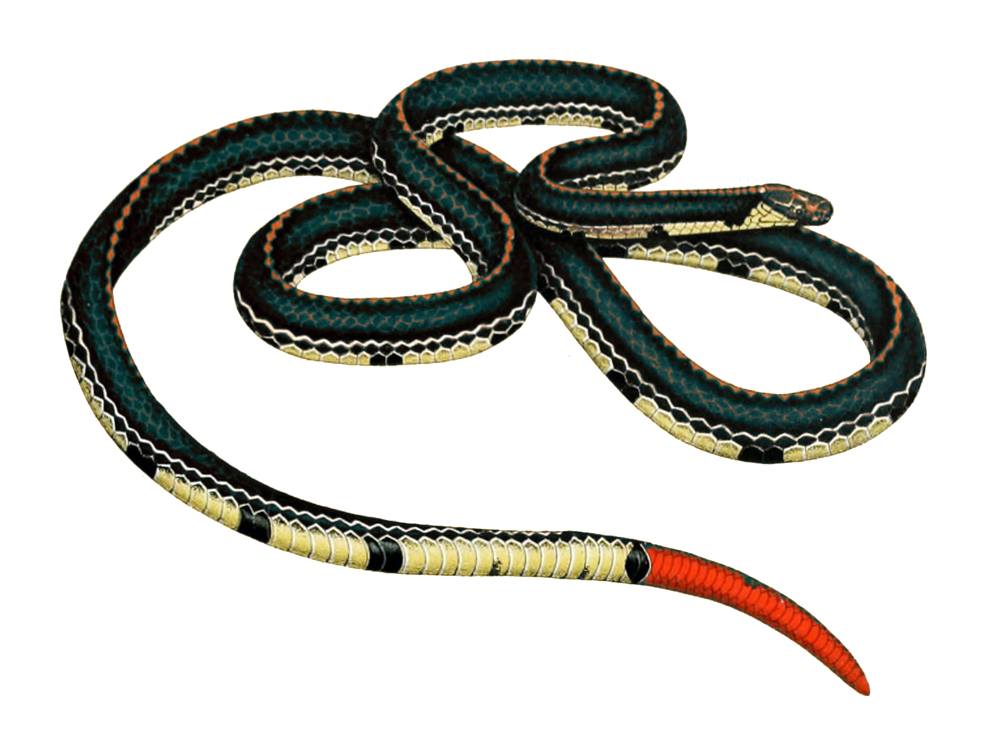
Calliophis intestinalis is preyed on by the western tarsier

This species is carnivorous. It mainly eats arthropods such as beetles, orthopterans like grasshoppers, katydids, and crickets, butterflies, moths, cockroaches, praying mantis, ants, phasmids, cicadas, dragonflies, freshwater crabs, and spiders, but also will eat small vertebrates such as flying frogs, bats (Chiroptera) including members of the genus Taphozous, the lesser short-nosed fruit bat (Cynopterus brachyotis), and the spotted-winged fruit bat (Balionycteris maculata), and snakes, of which venomous snakes have been found to be consumed, such as the elapid Calliophis intestinalis. This species was also found to consume birds, including spiderhunters, warblers, kingfishers, and pittas. It locates prey primarily by sound and catches the prey with its hands when foraging. Prey is killed through bites to the back of the neck and the tarsier's eyes are shut when attacking. It will consume the prey starting with the head and working its way down the body. This species gets water both by drinking from a pool or stream, and by licking drops from bamboo leaves or from water running down the trunks of trees. Horsfield's tarsier is a host of the acanthocephalan intestinal parasite Moniliformis tarsii.

Like all tarsiers, Horsfield's tarsiers are vertical clingers and leapers, known for extraordinary leaping abilities. An individual will mainly support itself with its feet and the tail, both exerting enough force to hold the individual in place. The hands are not always used because of the pads located on the feet provide adequate grip. The hands are usually placed no higher than its nose except when resting; the hands are only placed higher up to maintain the position of the individual. Other modes of locomotion used by the species include climbing, quadrupedal walking, hopping and "cantilevering."

=== Life cycle ===
Horsfield's tarsiers are monogamous, with a copulation frequency during estrus of once per night. Courtship calls are performed by the male and he emits 2–3 chirrups while opening and closing the mouth. This call happens within 5 minutes of looking at the female. Once the male gives his courtship call, if the female is receptive, she will perform genital displays to him. If the female is not in estrus, she will emit an agonistic call which is often followed by biting and pushing the male away. Both sexes' calls last on average for 1 second, and the interval between calls is on average 3 seconds.

Infants are born with their eyes open and fully furred and able to groom themselves. The mother will carry her infant in her mouth and when she forages for food the mother will park the infant on a branch. Infant sounds are mostly clicks: "k", "tk", "ki", or a rapid "kooih" and can be heard when the infant is left alone or is cold. The mother stays in contact with their infants using high-pitched calls. Infants were found to first use the tails as support during resting at 7–10 days. Social grooming in this species only occurs between mothers and infants, removing dead skin and parasites by scratching with their toe claws and licking their fur, avoiding their faces. Faces are cleaned by rubbing on branches and it is to reinforce social bonds.

Young leave their mother's range at the onset of puberty, and find their own territory. Horsfield's tarsiers mark their territory with scents from urine and glandular secretions on a substrate while scratching the surface with its hind-limb toe claws.

== Conservation status ==
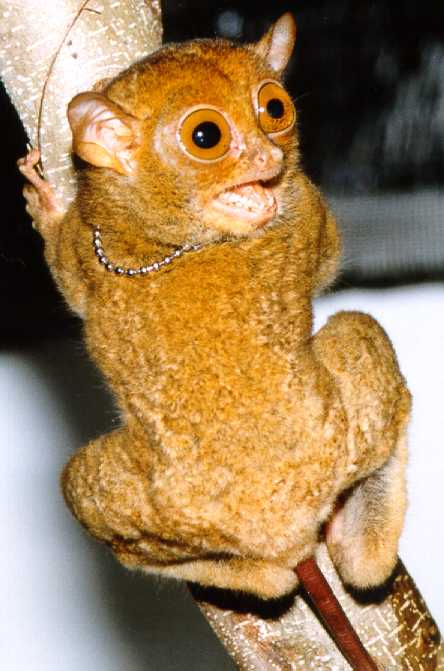
Horsfield's tarsier in Sarawak, wearing a metal collar.

The rapid loss of habitat due to forest conversion, oil palm plantations, fire, and logging is cause for concern. Additionally, the species is also collected for the illegal pet trade and wrongly considered a pest to agricultural crops. It can suffer, directly and indirectly, from the use of agricultural pesticides.

Horsfield's tarsier is listed as vulnerable in the 2008 IUCN Red List of Threatened Species, listed in CITES Appendix II, and protected by law in Indonesia and in Malaysia; it is scheduled as a "totally protected animal" under Sarawak state law through the 1998 Wild Life Protection Ordinance.

In February 2007, the governments of Brunei, Malaysia, and Indonesia agreed to protect roughly 220,000 km^{2} (85,000 sq mi) of tropical forest in the "Heart of Borneo" region. Environmental group WWF was particularly active in the establishment of the protected area. In the "Heart of Borneo" project, non-governmental organizations (NGOs) have played a role in promoting the critical initiative and in assisting the neighboring nations in its conceptualization, design, and implementation. The countries are to improve biodiversity conservation in Bornean production forests, and to ensure that such forests are not simply converted to agricultural land-uses such as oil-palm plantations after logging.

== Gallery ==
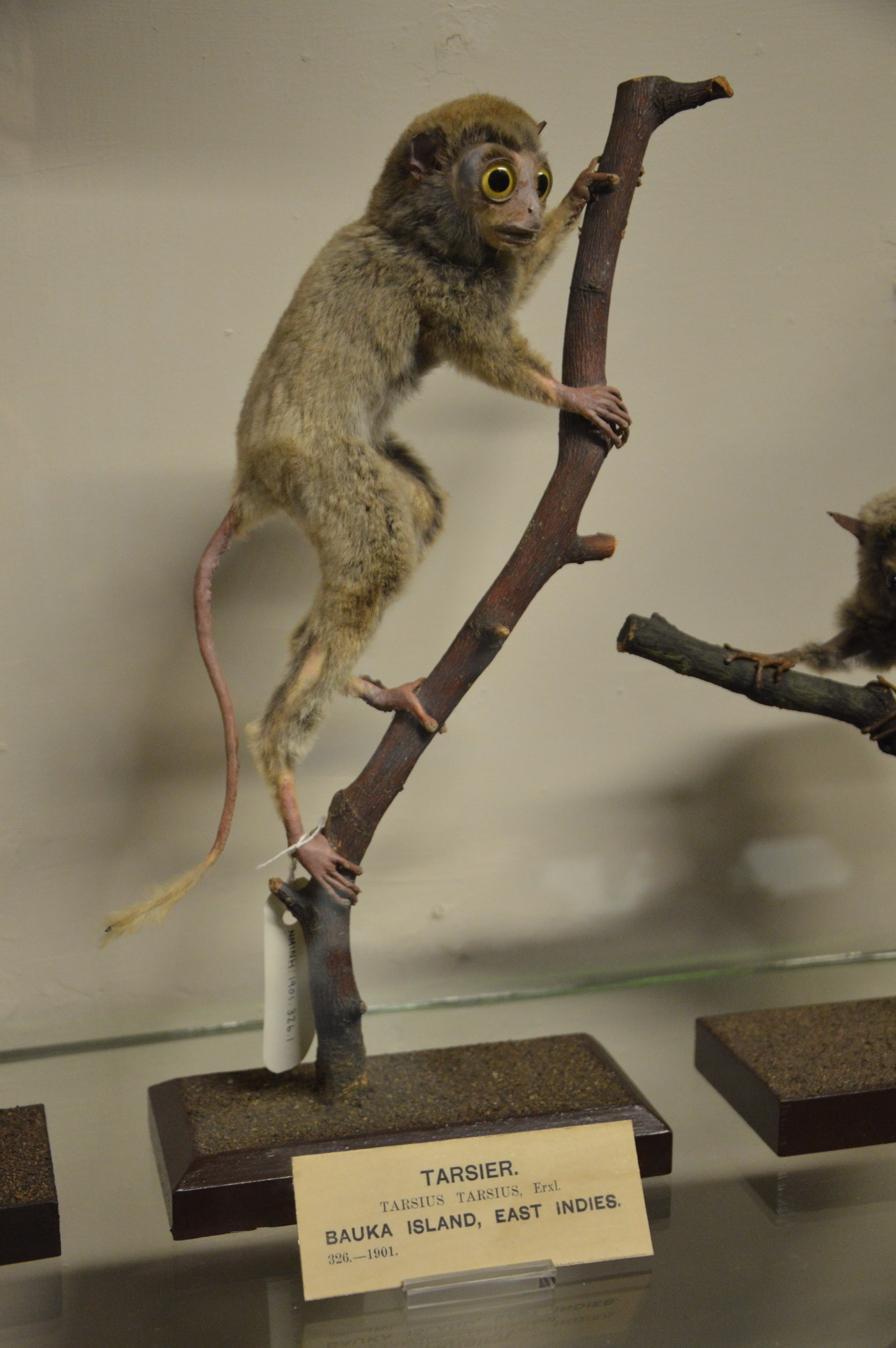
Cephalopachus bancanus bancanus from Bangka in National Museum of Ireland, Dublin

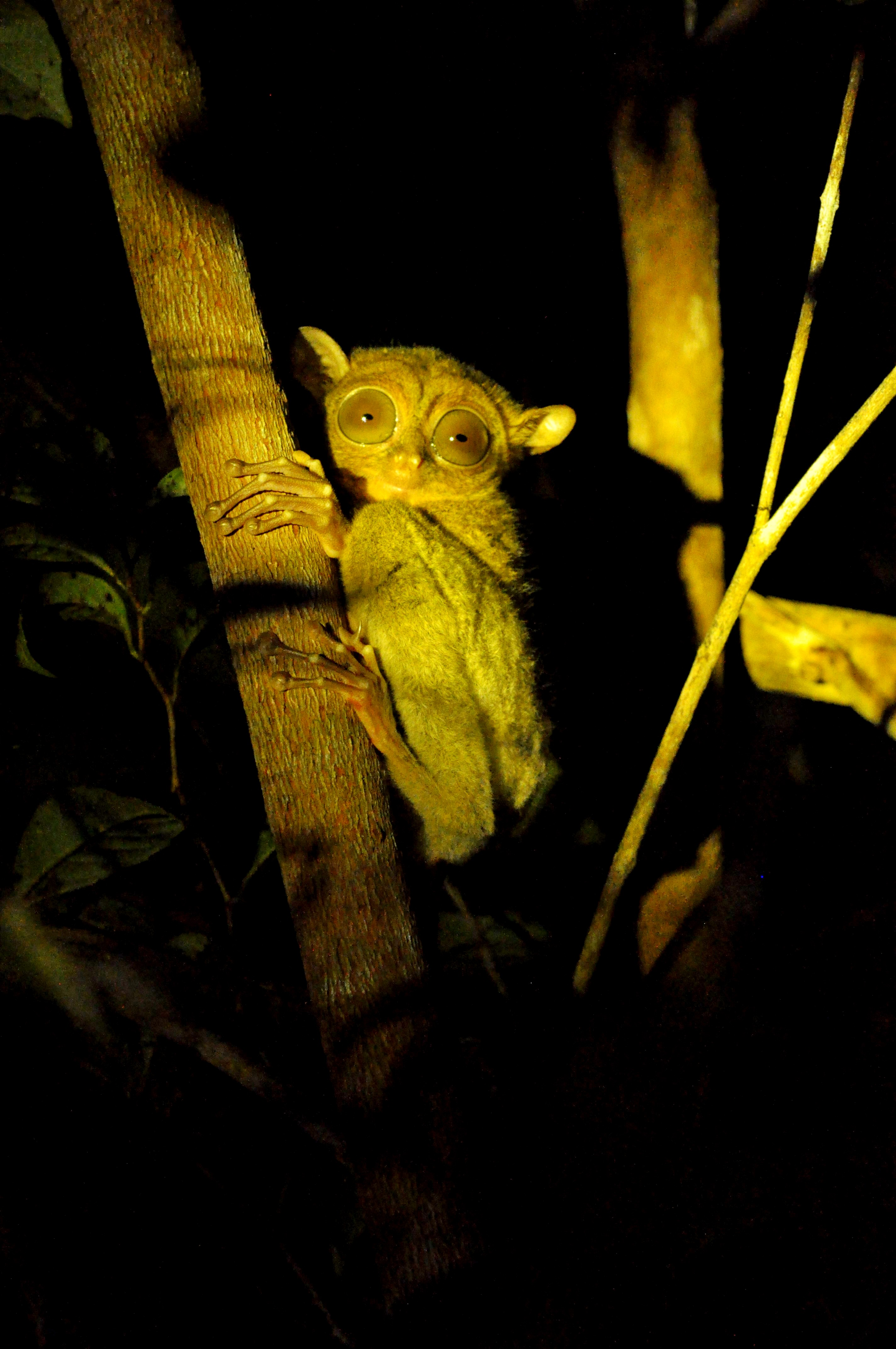
Cephalopachus bancanus saltator from Belitung

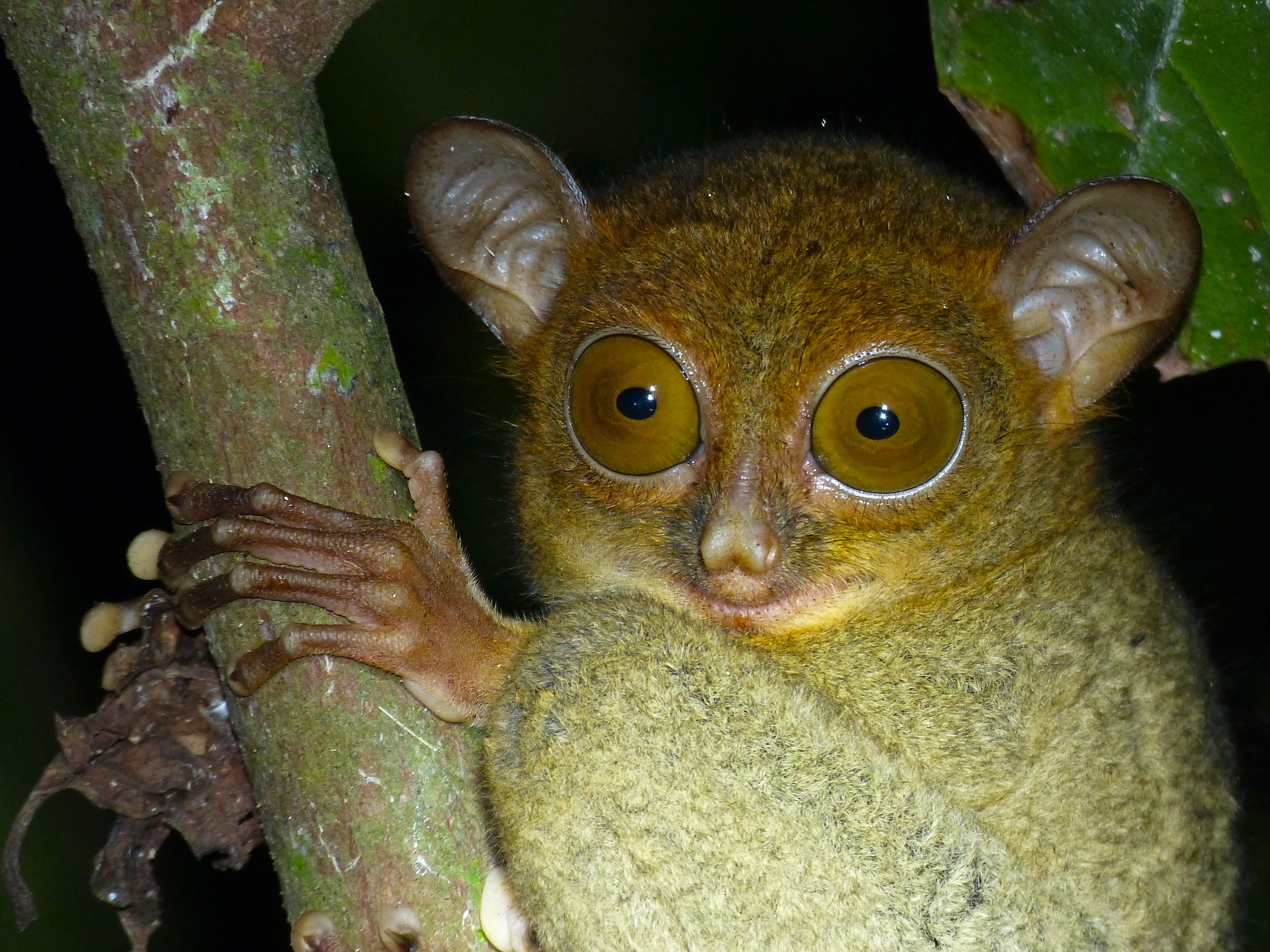
Cephalopachus bancanus borneanus

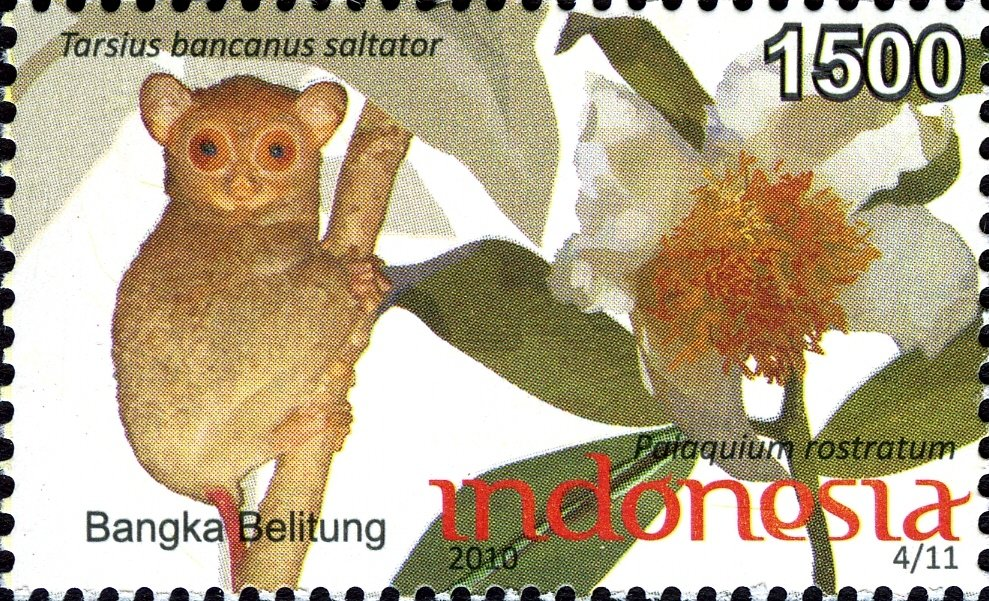
Postage stamp

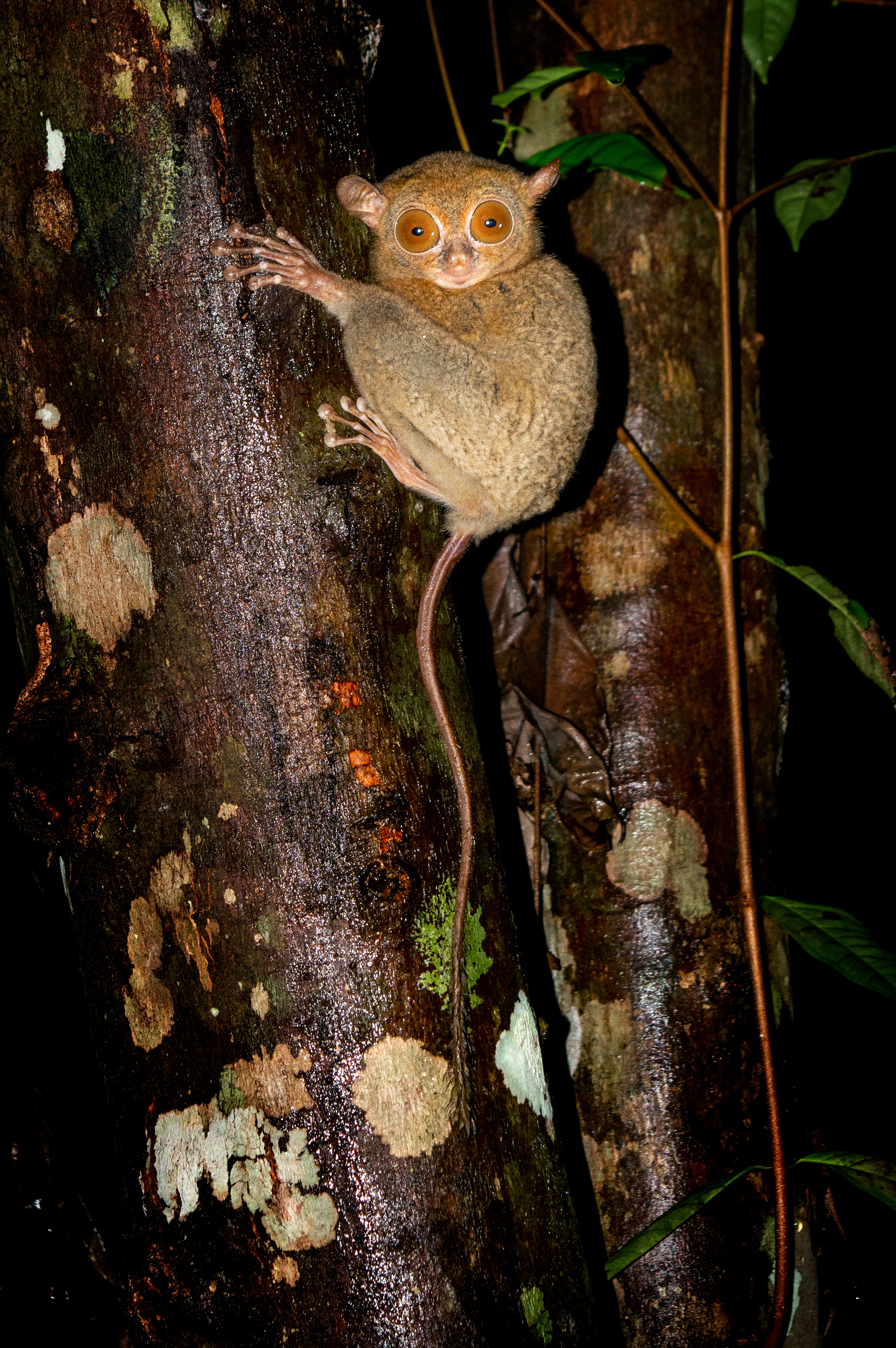

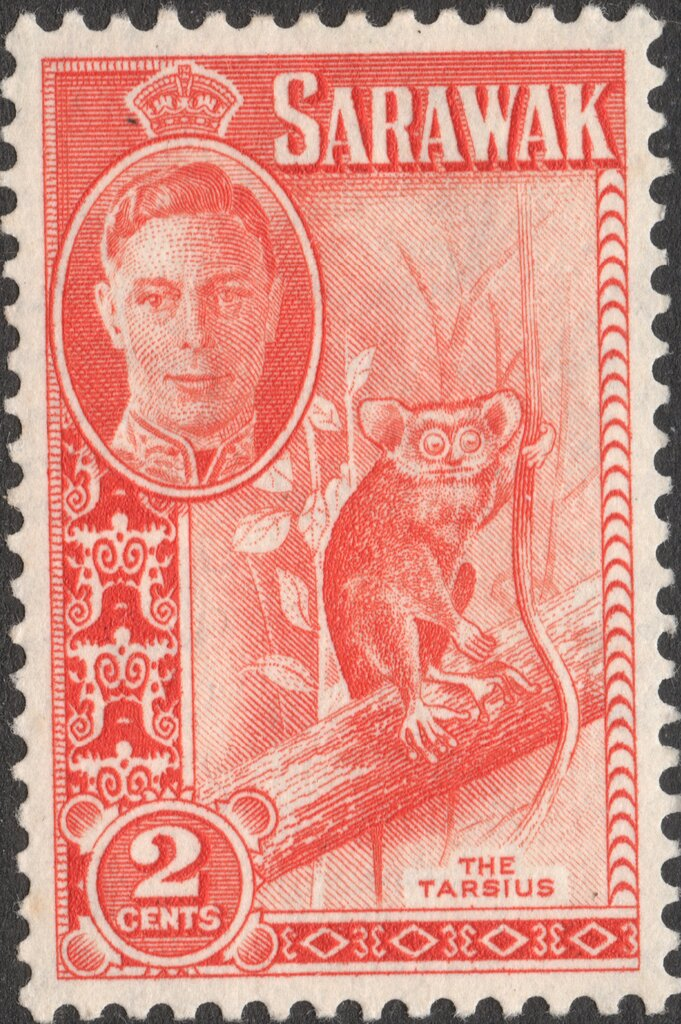
Postage stamp featuring the western tarsier and George VI (top left)

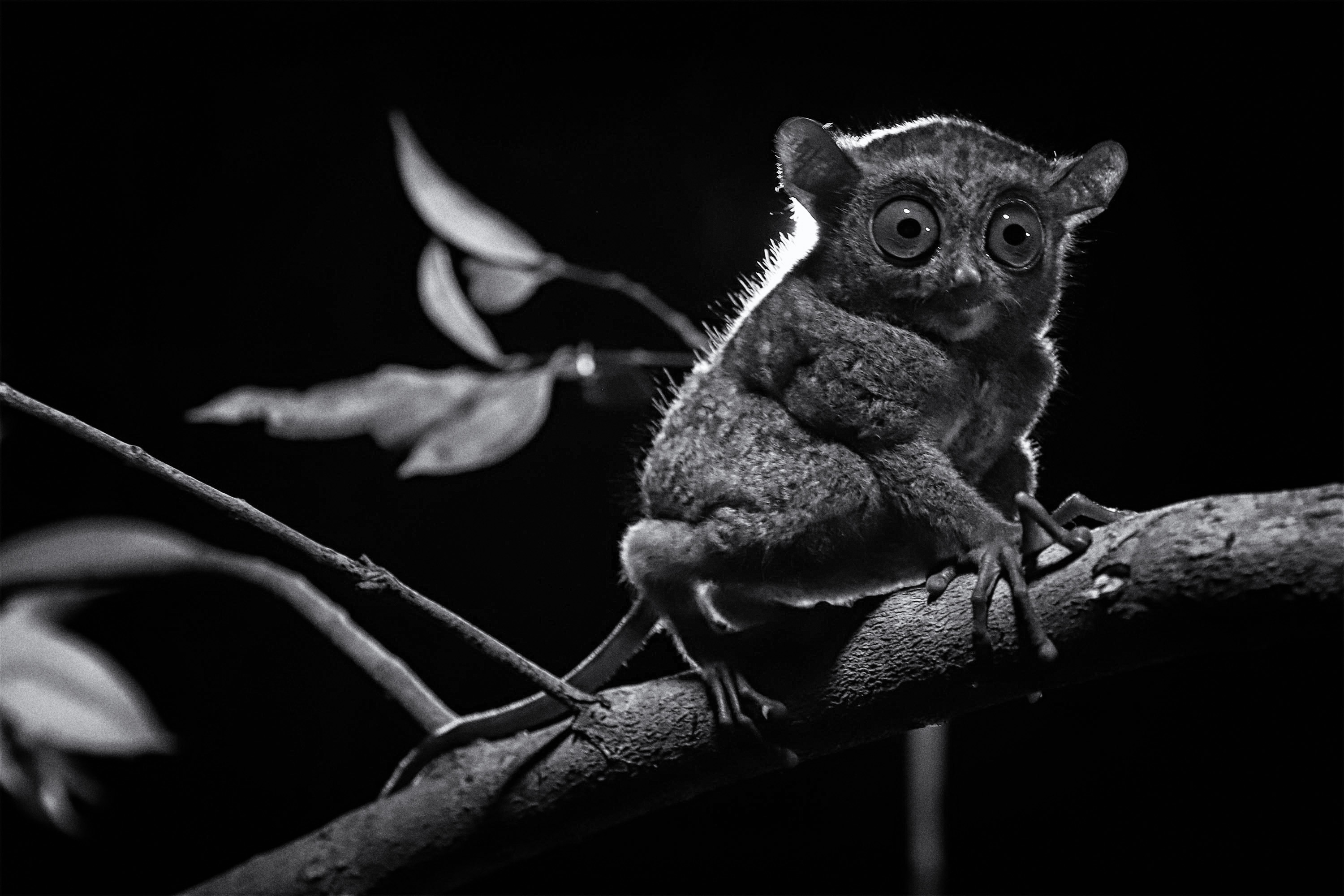

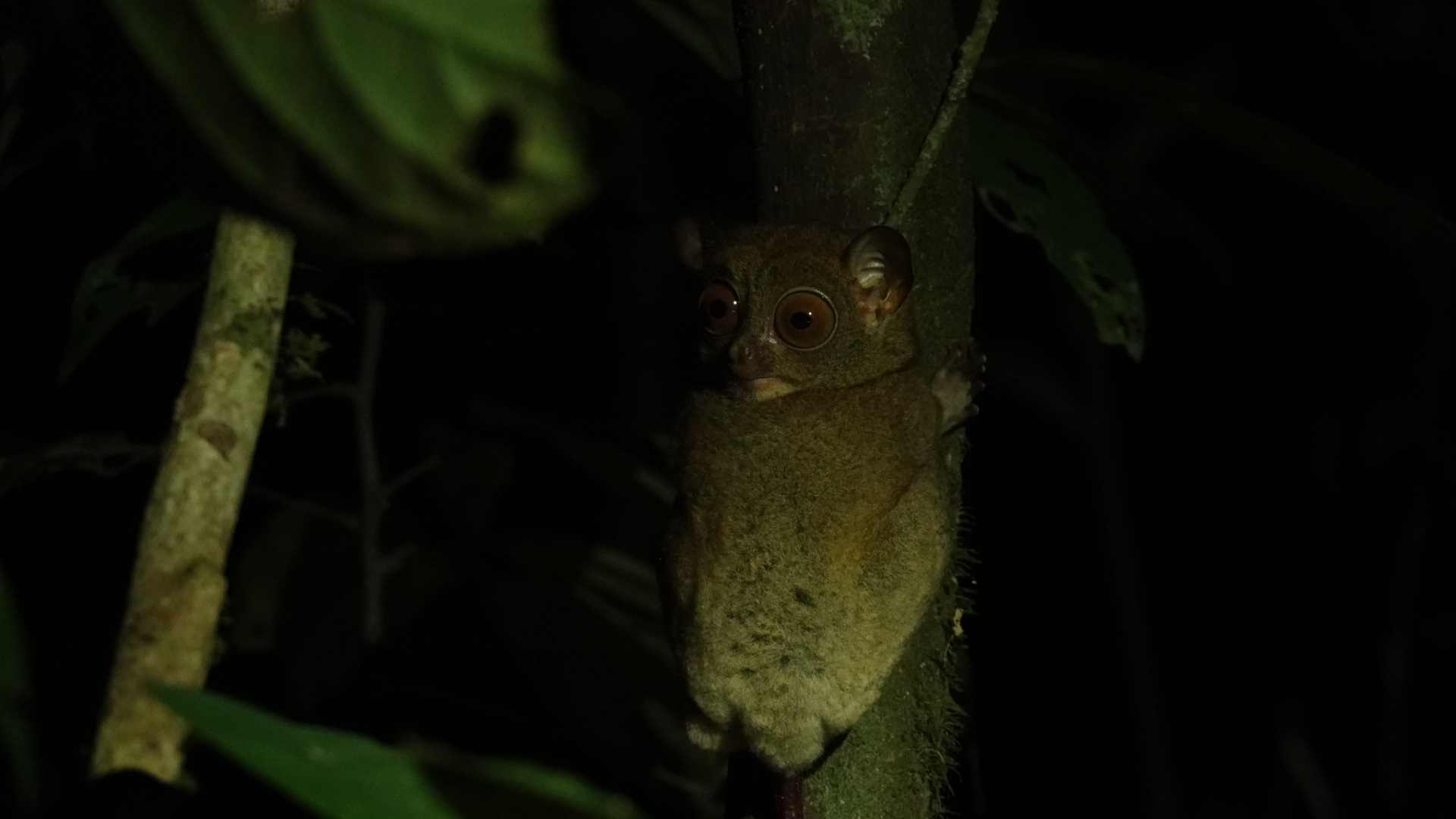
In darkness
