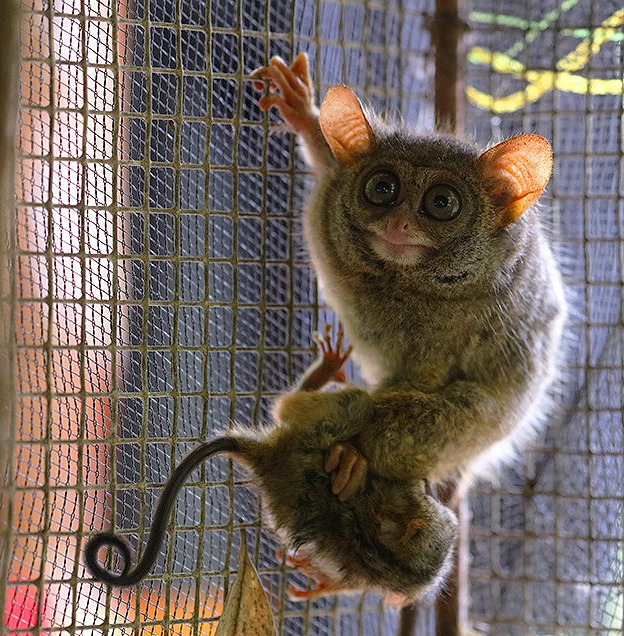
- Tarsius fuscus with newly born baby in Babul National Park

Conservation status
- Vulnerable (IUCN 3.1)

Scientific classification
- Kingdom: Animalia
- Phylum: Chordata
- Class: Mammalia
- Infraclass: Placentalia
- Order: Primates
- Family: Tarsiidae
- Genus: Tarsius
- Species: T. fuscus

Binomial name
- Tarsius fuscus G. Fischer, 1804

= Makassar tarsier =

Species of primate

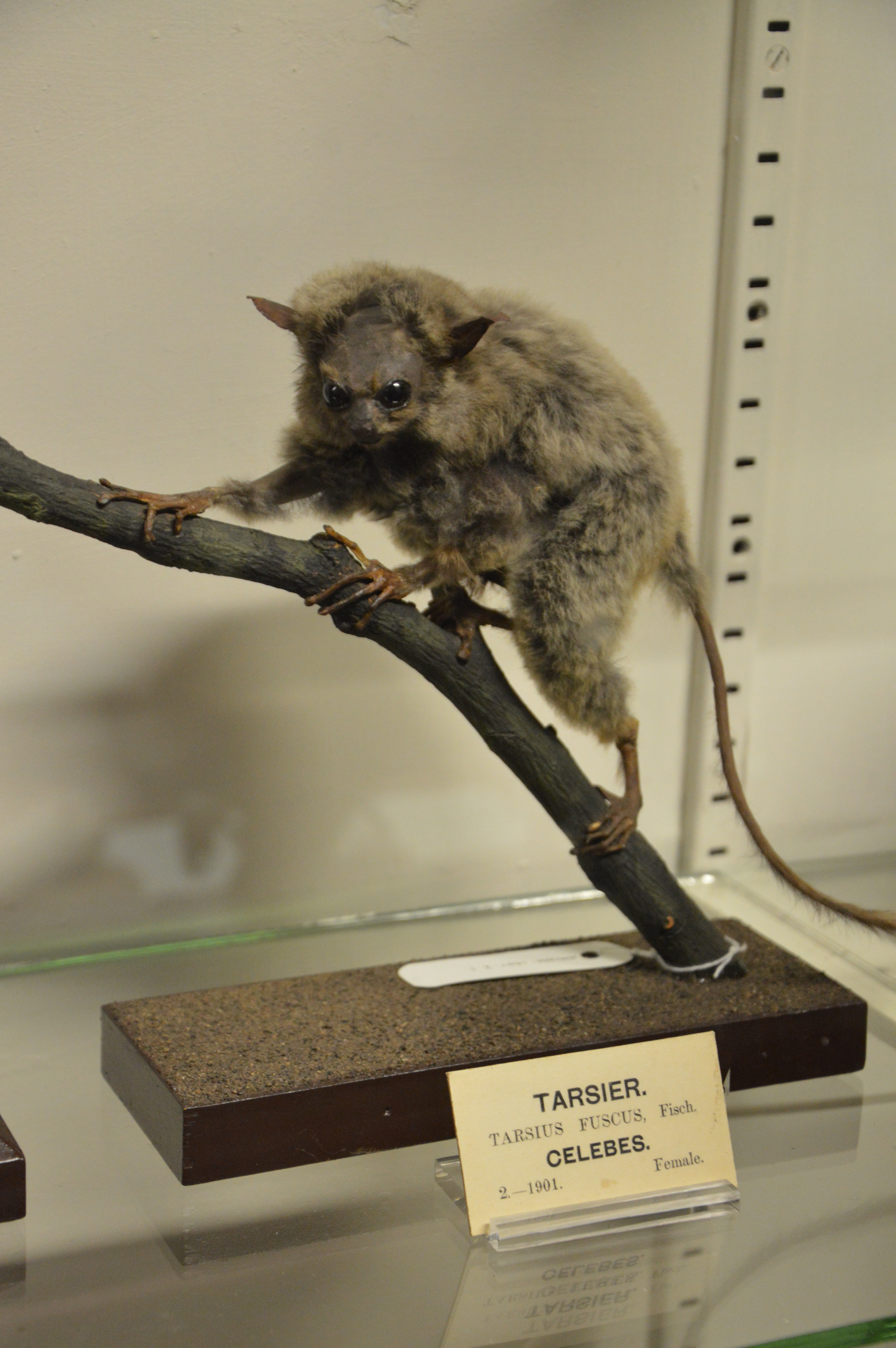
Tarsius fuscus at the National Museum of Ireland, in Dublin.

The Makassar tarsier (Tarsius fuscus), also known locally as Balao Cengke, is a species of tarsier. Its range is in Indonesia in the southwestern peninsula of the island of Sulawesi, South Sulawesi, near Makassar. At one point the taxon was downgraded to a junior synonym of the spectral tarsier (T. tarsier). However, when that species' range was restricted to the population on a single island near Sulawesi, this nomen was resurrected to contain the remainder of that species.

== Taxonomic confusion ==
The taxonomy of the tarsiers from Sulawesi has long been confused. T. fuscus was initially described by Fischer in 1804. The species was subsequently renamed twice inadvertently, as T. fuscomanus in 1812 by Geoffroy and as T. fischeri in 1846 by Burmeister. In 1953 William Charles Osman Hill concluded that the type locality of T. spectrum was actually Makassar, although it was stated to have come from Ambon. As a result, Hill concluded that T. fuscus was a junior synonym of T. spectrum. T. spectrum was later determined to be a junior synonym of T. tarsier. In 2010, Groves restricted T. tarsier to just those tarsiers on the island of Selayar, making the name T. fuscus valid once again for the tarsiers near Makassar.

== Description ==
The Makassar tarsier has generally reddish-brown fur. The hair at the end of the tail is black. It has shorter skull and shorter toothrows than most other tarsiers. It also has shorter hind feet than other tarsiers. The tail is shorter relative to body size than most tarsiers, representing 143% to 166% of the body length.

== Natural history ==
All Tarsius species are nocturnal and arboreal. Like all Tarsius, T. fuscus is exclusively carnivorous and insectivorous, generally capturing prey by leaping on it.
