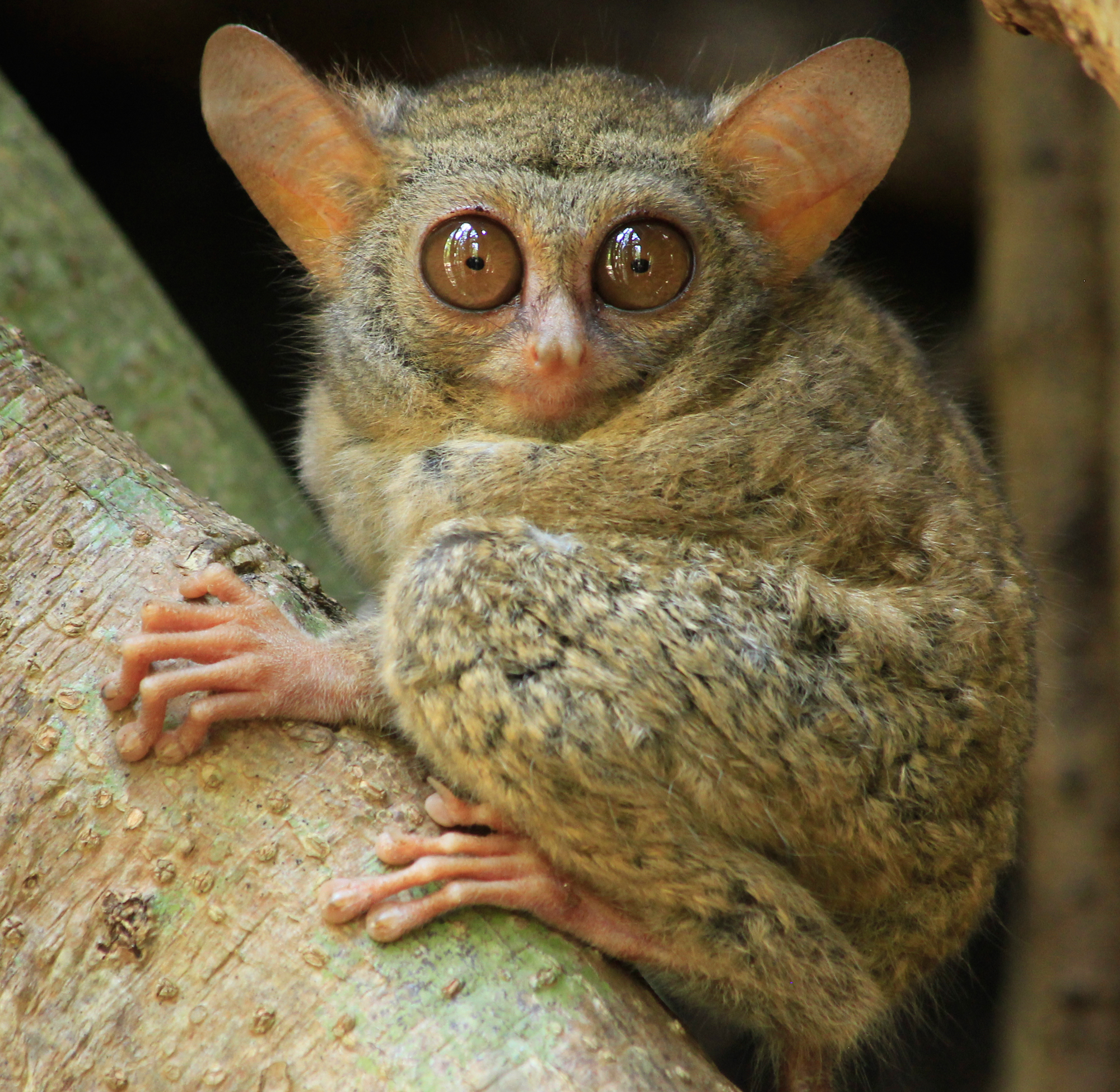
- At Sulawesi, Indonesia

Conservation status
- Vulnerable (IUCN 3.1)

Scientific classification
- Kingdom: Animalia
- Phylum: Chordata
- Class: Mammalia
- Infraclass: Placentalia
- Order: Primates
- Family: Tarsiidae
- Genus: Tarsius
- Species: T. spectrumgurskyae

Binomial name
- Tarsius spectrumgurskyae Shekelle, Groves, Maryanto & Mittermeier, 2017

= Gursky's spectral tarsier =

Species of primate

Gursky's spectral tarsier (Tarsius spectrumgurskyae), also known locally as wusing, is a species of tarsier found in the island of Sulawesi in Indonesia. A recent taxonomic revision split this species off from the spectral tarsier and other tarsier species based on difference in vocalisations and pelage. These tarsiers, like other species of primates, are able to communicate with other individuals of the same species through flexible call patterns, in which they output different note patterns based on their duet partner's calls.

== Etymology ==
The species is named after Dr. Sharon Gursky, who carried out studies on the species's behavioral ecology (published using the now-superseded taxonomy, with the studied population classified as spectral tarsier, Tarsius spectrum). The new name avoids the disconnect between the name used in the earlier publications and Gursky's study population.
