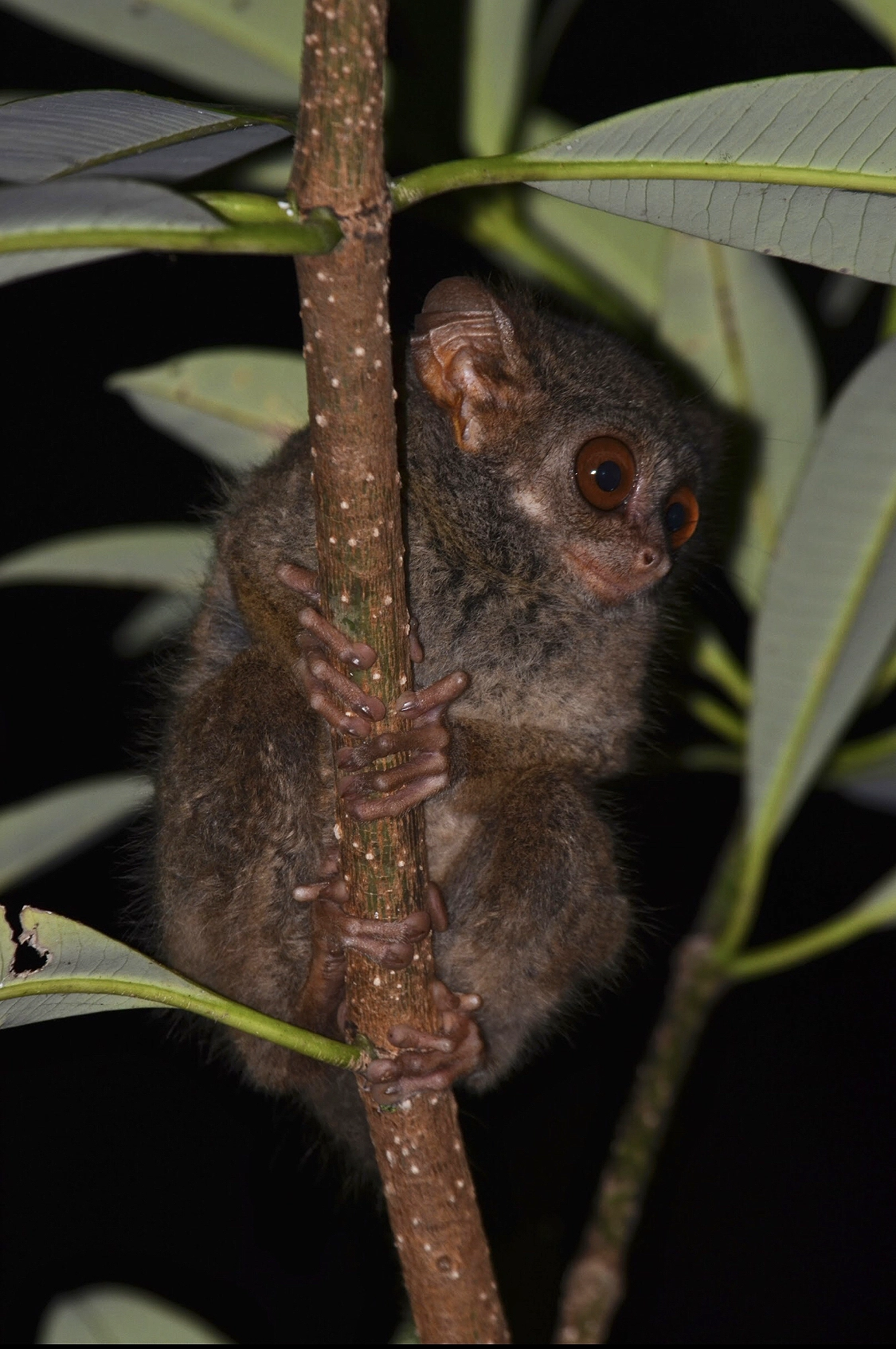
- Tarsius dentatus in Morowali Nature Preserve, Central Sulawesi

Conservation status
- Vulnerable (IUCN 3.1)

Scientific classification
- Kingdom: Animalia
- Phylum: Chordata
- Class: Mammalia
- Order: Primates
- Family: Tarsiidae
- Genus: Tarsius
- Species: T. dentatus

Binomial name
- Tarsius dentatus Miller & Hollister, 1921
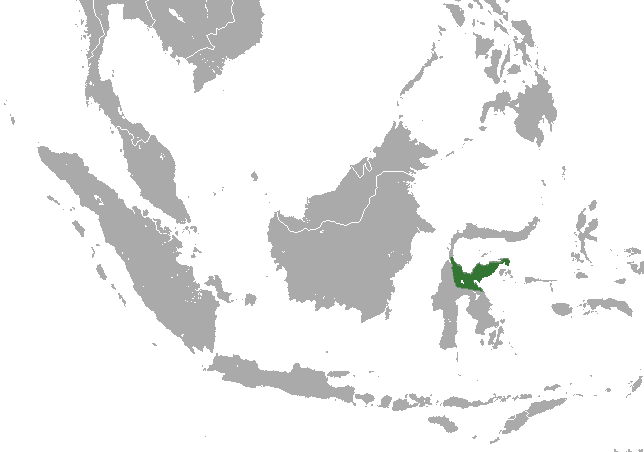
- Dian's tarsier range

Synonyms
- Tarsius fuscus dentatus G. S. Miller & Hollister, 1921; Tarsius dianae Niemitz, Nietsch, Water, and Rumpler, 1991

= Dian's tarsier =

Species of primate

Dian's tarsier (Tarsius dentatus), also known as the Diana tarsier, is a nocturnal primate endemic to rainforests of Central Sulawesi, Indonesia. Tarsius dianae is a junior synonym of T. dentatus, named in 1991 in honor of the Roman goddess of hunting Diana and the late Dian Fossey.

It is highly adapted to vertical clinging and leaping, like other tarsiers, and has a strict live animal diet, consisting mostly of insects. Due to human development, Dian's tarsier tends to adapt its ranging behavior based on the degree of human activity. Slightly disturbed habitats have been shown to have little effect on the Dian's tarsier, but with larger disturbances, the habitat is less suitable.

== Physical characteristics ==
Adult Dian's tarsiers measure from 11.5 to 12 centimetres (4.5 to 4.7 in) in head-body length; the tail may measure 22 cm (8.7 in). Weight ranges from 100 to 150 grams (3.5 to 5.3 oz).

This species is characterized by a greyish buff color to their woolly fur, with a black spot on each side of the nose and white-colored fur on the middle lower lip and on both sides of the upper lip.

== Habitat ==
Dian's tarsier is found in primary rainforests of the lower mountains of central Sulawesi. It can also be found in habitat modified (disturbed) by humans such as secondary forests with logging, agroforestry or intensive agriculture.

== Behavior ==
This species is most active after dusk and before dawn, being nocturnal. After dusk, Dian's tarsiers leave the sleeping sites they use during the day, traverse completely their home range, and go hunt for food in their home range at night where they will be more stationary during hunting and eating. Before dawn, duet vocalisation signals to other members of the group to return to the sleeping site. Dian's tarsiers can travel more than 100 meters to reach their sleeping site in under 15 minutes before dawn. They use forest undergrowth to move.

Dian's tarsier eats most commonly crickets, grasshoppers and moths.

=== Sociality ===
Groups can range from two to seven individuals. Each group is composed of one adult male paired with one to three adult females and their offspring, which can be male and female juveniles. Strangler fig trees are the preferred sleeping site for Dian's tarsier. The individuals will sleep in crevices or opening in the tree. Although this species is also able to sleep in bamboo stands and dense shrubbery which are more common in degraded habitats. Members of the same group will sleep in the same site during the day. Typically, groups will return to the same sleeping site night after night, though they can change site, particularly if the area was disturbed. Some groups have been seen using two or more regular sites. Sleeping sites are typically located on the boundary of the home range, possibly to renew the scent of animals on their territory.

Home ranges of mated males and females pairs overlap. There is slight overlap between the home ranges of different groups. The male home range is slightly larger than the female's in undisturbed habitat with average home ranges sizes of 1.77 hectares and 1.58 hectares respectively. This species shows sexually dimorphic morning duet vocalization. The majority of duet calls are started by the female. The female starts with a high pitched rapid series of notes. The pitch lowers towards the middle of the song where most commonly a trill will be made, other options include long notes. The pitch increases towards the end of the song. The male will sing at the same time as his mate. He sings a rapid series of notes that start with a low pitch and end in a high pitch. Songs have a median close to one minute in length. The end of the songs have more and irregularly spaced time between notes. These calls are specific to this species of tarsiers, as no other species of tarsiers responded to them.

=== Reproduction ===
Females of this species typically give birth to one child per year. Reproduction does not appear to vary by season. Dian's tarsiers use infant parking.

== Conservation ==
Dian's tarsier species is in decline. The lowest population density found in 1998 was the highest population density found in 2000-2001.

In Sulawesi, including in national parks such as the Lore Lindu National Park, old growth rainforest is being altered by humans. Logging of primary forest trees and illegal logging deteriorate the Dian's tarsier habitat. Other commercial avenues used on this land include: bamboo and rattan logging, and plantation of cash crops, such as cocoa and coffee, all plants that are not native to the area. Between 2000 and 2017, the Dian's tarsier lost 10% of its total forest habitat and 4% of its protected forest habitat.

=== Adaptation to habitat degradation ===
Population density is the highest by far in undisturbed habitat at 57.1 groups/km^{2}. All levels of disturbed habitat where Dian's tarsiers are found show similar population densities (32.9 groups/km^{2}-38.0 groups/km^{2}), with heavily disturbed habitats showing the lowest.

Home ranges of females in low and moderate levels of human disturbed habitat are smaller than in undisturbed habitat. Home ranges in habitats heavily disturbed by humans are larger than in all other habitats. Researchers hypothesize that this is due to the increased number of insects in slightly disturbed habitat. This slightly disturbed habitat has more canopy openings which may attract more insects. The largest home ranges are in the most disturbed habitats, these also have the least insects, likely due to the use of pesticides in plantations. Nightly paths lengths are similar in males and females in undisturbed habitat. Female path length increases with increased human disturbance of the habitat. Since nightly path length is related to energy expenditure, Dian's tarsiers expend more energy in more disturbed habitats. Females typically cover more of their home range in one night in low and moderate levels of disturbance in their habitats.

Maintaining forest habitat by stopping illegal logging, practicing agroforestry, protecting sleeping sites and preserving forest undergrowth would allow Dian's tarsier to live in a habitat with low levels of degradation. Better public knowledge that Dian's tarsier does not eat cash crops and instead eats insects, as well as reducing the use of chemical pesticides, would also help.
