= Henri Jacob Victor Sody =

Dutch zoologist (1892–1959)

Henri Jacob Victor Sody (31 August 1892 - 16 January 1959) was a Dutch agronomist and mammalogist born in The Hague. He died in Amsterdam in 1959. He is recognized for his contributions to the taxonomy of Indonesian mammals and some birds, as well as for his work regarding the Javan rhinoceros.

== Education and work in the Dutch East Indies ==
Sody studied at the Wageningen University and Research in the Kingdom of the Netherlands. He obtained his certificate of colonial agriculture (studierichting Koloniale Landbouw) on 21 June 1917.

The following year, he traveled to Tjikadjang (now Cikadjang) near Garut, to the east of Priangan, in West Java, which at that time was part of the Dutch East Indies (now Indonesia). There, he became a planter on a tea plantation. In 1920, he became a professor in the service of the Dutch government at an agricultural school in Bogor.

He returned to Amsterdam in 1926, and married his spouse Frederika Cohen on 7 April 1927. He returned to Java to resume teaching the same year. Upon his return to The Hague in 1933, he was depressed and declared unfit to continue service in the tropics. He was medically cleared to return to work in 1934.

== Career as a zoologist ==
In 1941, he was allowed to stop teaching due to his health problems. He was temporarily assigned to the Bogor Zoology Museum with the mission to classify the members of family Muridae, rodents that were implicated in agricultural damage and the propagation of leptospirosis in Indonesia. Due to the Japanese occupation of Java in 1942, Sody was interred in a camp in Bogor alongside his family, though he was allowed to continue his work. Following the 1945 surrender of Japan, he renewed his contract with the museum at the request of Baas Becking, director of the museum's botanical garden. He returned to Amsterdam in 1947, where he was determined permanently unfit for work in the tropics. He died there on 16 January 1959.

== Work ==
Sody described several species and genera in the family Muridae, including Rattus adustus and Madromys. He also described the Togian babirusa. During his lifetime, his private zoological collection was on loan to the Rijksmuseum van Natuurlijke Historie; after his death, it was donated to the museum by his widow.

He published the major work On a collection of Rats from the Indo-Malayan and Indo-Australian regions (with descriptions of 43 new genera, species and subspecies) in 1941. In this work, among other notes on the members of Murinus, Sody listed the subspecies of Rattus rattus native to those regions.
