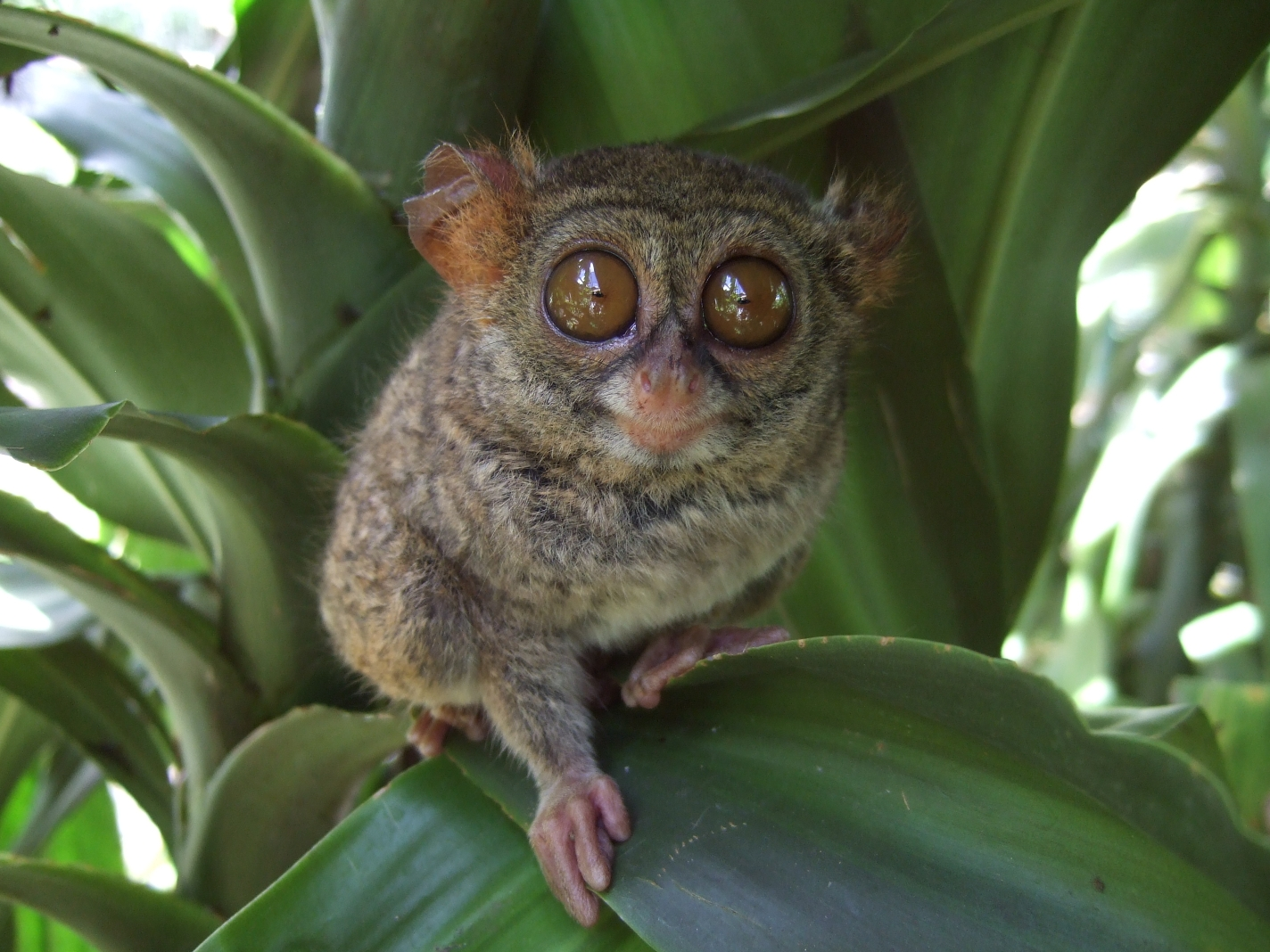

Conservation status
- Vulnerable (IUCN 3.1)

Scientific classification
- Kingdom: Animalia
- Phylum: Chordata
- Class: Mammalia
- Order: Primates
- Family: Tarsiidae
- Genus: Tarsius
- Species: T. tarsier

Binomial name
- Tarsius tarsier (Erxleben, 1777)
- Spectral tarsier (Tarsius tarsier) range in Selayar Islands

= Spectral tarsier =

Species of mammal

Spectral tarsier or Selayar tarsier (Tarsius tarsier, also called Tarsius spectrum) is a species of tarsier found on the island of Selayar in Indonesia. It is apparently less specialized than the Philippine tarsier or Horsfield's tarsier; for example, it lacks adhesive toes. It is the type species for the genus Tarsius. While its range used to also include the population on nearby southwestern Sulawesi, this population has been reclassified as a separate species, Tarsius fuscus. Some of the earlier research published on Tarsius spectrum refers to the taxon that was recently reclassified and elevated to a separate species, the Gursky's spectral tarsier (Tarsius spectrumgurskyae).

== Evolutionary relations ==
"Tarsiers were once thought to be of the Strepsirrhini suborder, grouped with Lemuroidea and Lorisidae because of their similar appearance and because they have a small stature and are also nocturnal. It has been decided that tarsiers are members of the suborder haplorrhine, which is a suborder of primates that hosts tarsiers and the simians (Archuleta, 2019)." According to Gursky et al. 2003, based on phylogenic research, tarsiers are more closely related to monkeys and apes than lemurs and lorises. Some scholarly articles suggest dividing the genus into 3 and some references reflect this attempted revised taxonomy. "This taxonomic discrepancy is strongly supported by data collection of physiological attributes such as coat colors, tail lengths, and size as well as molecular data (Gursky et al. 2003)."

== Anatomy ==
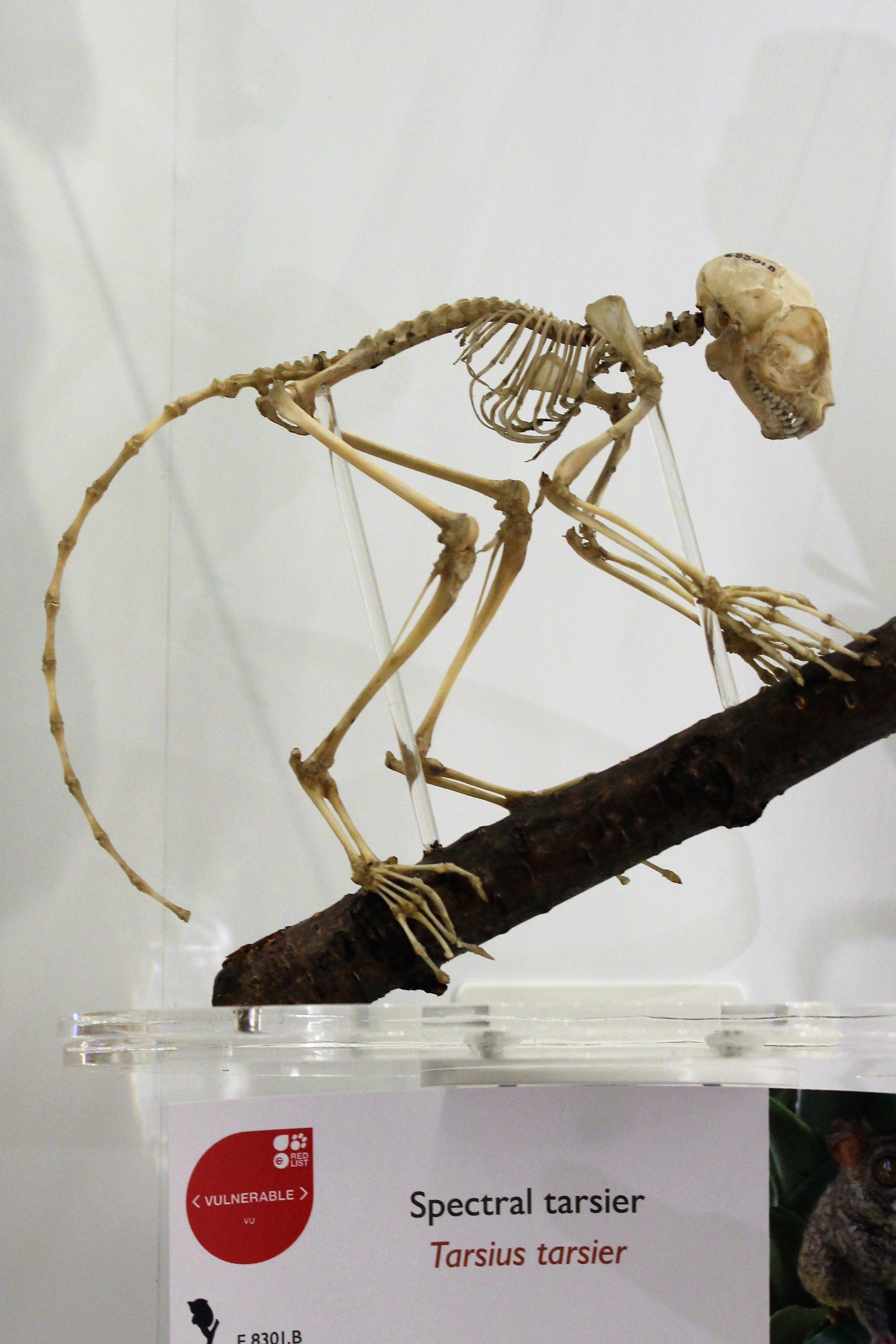
The skeleton of a spectral tarsier, Tarsius spectrum.

The spectral tarsier has a body weight of 200 grams, with a body length of 240 mm, a head body length of 80 mm, and a tail length of 160 mm. When including Tarsius fuscus, females of the species weigh between 102 and 114 grams (3.6 and 4.0 oz) while males are 118 to 130 grams (4.2 to 4.6 oz). It has a head-body length of 9.5 to 14 centimetres (3.7 to 5.5 in) and its tail length ranges from 20 to 26 centimetres (7.9 to 10.2 in).

== Distribution and habitat ==
Tarsiers are found in forests that range in density and agricultural development from island to island, including both primary and secondary habitats. "They roost in dense vegetation, shrubs, bamboo, palm, dense thickets of grass, bush, thorn scrubs, and secondary habitats on plantations for logging and growing coffee, nutmeg, coconut, or coca crops (Archuleta, S. 2019)."

== Biology ==
=== Food and foraging ===
In a study done by John and Kathy MacKinnon, it was found that tarsiers have a completely carnivorous diet, which is unique in primates. Although some species will prey on small birds and rodents, their diet consists mainly of insects that they capture on the ground, tree branches and leaves, and in the air (Mackinnon et al., 1980).

=== Behavior ===
Tarsiers are nocturnal mammals. They wake up at sunset and spend the nights foraging for insects and eating. They travel between trees and socialize, which usually includes grooming one another, scent marking, playing and vocalizing (Gursky et al. 2000).

At the very base of the tarsier society is that they live in groups and males and females have different roles. Males tend to travel longer distances and they occupy a larger area. Females tend to hunt more efficiently and they also consume more insects. A study done by Sharon Gursky in 1998 defines group size as the number of individuals sharing a sleeping site. She goes on to say that these groups are usually composed of 2 to 6 individuals. The study was done in the Tangkoko Dua Saudara Nature Reserve and Gursky et al. found that 14% of groups contained more than 1 adult female. "In one of the groups with two adult females, both females gave birth to infants (Gursky et al. 1998)." In the research done by Sabrina Archuleta, it was found that tarsiers can be both monogamous and polygynous. She found that some live in pairs or groups and some males may even live alone.

== Life history ==
In a study done in North Sulawesi, Indonesia in 2007, the Mackinnons found that the spectral tarsiers were monogamous and territorial. They found that families slept at the same sites each day and that they gave loud duet songs as they gathered at sleeping sites. As their study went on they found that tarsier young are quite advanced and that they start traveling alone at as young as 23 days (Mackinnon et al. 1980). Hidayatik et al. did a 9-month survey in 2018 where they found that the tarsiers courtship behaviours consist of scent marking and genital marking for females and that males use genital inspection. They recorded that copulations lasted between 3 and 4 minutes and occurred only once per pair for the duration of the study (Hidayatik et al. 2018).

Sharon Gursky did a study in the a northern Sulawesi rain forest in 1994 where she found that infants were alone from 40%-50% of the time. Gursky et al. found that the two subadults in the group were more regularly caring for the infant than the adult males, females or mothers were. They believe that these results suggest that subadults are actually guarding or babysitting the infants (Gursky et al. 1994). Infanticide has been reported by Gursky, but only in one case and by a neighboring adult male. "The only hypothesis that could not be rejected outright, on the basis of this single observation, was the competition for limited resources hypothesis (Gursky et al. 2011)."

=== Lifespan ===
This tarsier's average lifespan in the wild is around ten years. In captivity, the closely related Horsfield's tarsier can live up to 17 years and the spectral may be similar. Old age begins affecting tarsier behavior at between 14 and 16 years of age, when their hair begins to turn gray.

=== Communication ===
A study done in 2019 by Sharon Gursky found that spectral tarsiers use ultrasonic vocalizations. These are high frequency and can only travel short distances. She identifies this as echolocation and says it is used for navigation. "There are 5 main categories of vocalizations: chirps, twitters, choruses, doubles and whistles. Chirps, twitters, and choruses extended from the audible to the ultrasonic range, the doubles and whistles were pure ultrasound."

Archuleta S. 2019 talks about how vocalizations include high pitched whistles and duets. She goes on to say that duets are like chattering melodies and high pitched whistles vary from simple calls to predator warnings, which precludes mobbing behavior; tarsiers may attack a predator in a group. "In the presence of bird predators, individuals vocalize and disperse to hide. When in the presence of a terrestrial predator, such as a reticulated python, individuals mob the threat." Gursky describes mobbing as all the individuals in an area responding to a threat with vocalizations and then each animal repeatedly lunging towards then retreating from the predator.

=== Natural threats ===
According to the study done by the Mackinnons, tarsiers scent mark their ranges by rubbing branches with urine and special epigastric glands. It was found that the primary predators of the tarsiers are monitor lizards, civets, reticulated pythons, and a variety of birds of prey. Archulete wrote: "Tarsier niches are largely as predator and prey. Their presence affects the population size of organisms that they feed on and of those who feed on them." She wrote they play host to parasites, inside and out including mites and intestinal worms.

== Conservation status ==
Gursky suggested changing the conservation status of the spectral tarsier from indeterminate to vulnerable in 1998. As of 2019, the spectral tarsier is still listed as vulnerable on the IUCN Red List assessment. Archuleta wrote: "Habitat loss and deforestation contributes to a decline in tarsier populations. Currently, tarsiers reside in many protected areas."
