= Ned Hollister =

American biologist

Ned Hollister (November 26, 1876 – November 3, 1924) was an American biologist primarily known for studying mammals.

Hollister was born in Delavan, Wisconsin to parents Kinner Newcomb Hollister (1841–1911) and Frances Margaret (Tilden) Hollister (1845–1927). He attended Delavan High School. He married Mabel Pfrimmer in 1908.

From 1916 until his death he was Superintendent of the National Zoological Park. In 1921 he served as president of the Biological Society of Washington. When Hollister was twelve, he gained an interest in birds as he studied under Ludwig Kumlien, who was a professor at Milton College. At the age of 16, Hollister wrote his first papers on ornithology. At 18, Hollister was elected to the American Ornithologists' Union. Hollister was designated to be the assistant curator of mammals at the U.S. National Museum in 1910. In the year of 1912, Hollister worked for the Smithsonian. In 1916, Ned Hollister was then designated to be the superintendent of the National Zoological Park. This is where he continued to work until he died. Hollister was recorded to be a man who was a quiet and keen observer, and he was very systematic in the way he worked.

Hollister died on November 3, 1924, in Washington D.C at the age of 47. After his death, his wife was appointed to a position at the Smithsonian by Executive order.

== Works ==
- The Birds of Wisconsin (1903)
- A Systematic Synopsis of Muskrats (1911)
- Mammals of the Philippine Islands (1912)
- Mammals of Alpine Club Expedition to Mount Robson (1913)
- Philippine Land Mammals in the U.S. National Museum (1913)
- A Systematic Account of the Grasshopper Mice (1914)
- A Systematic Account of the Prairie-dogs
