= Lemurs of Madagascar (book) =

2010 reference work and field guide

- Third edition cover
- Author: Russell Mittermeier; Kim E. Reuter; Anthony B. Rylands; Edward E. Louis Jr.; et al.
- Illustrator: Stephen D. Nash
- Language: English
- Series: Tropical Field Guide Series
- Genre: Field guide
- Published: 1994 (First ed.); 2006 (Second ed.); 2010 (Third ed.); 2014 (Fourth ed.); 2023 (Fifth ed.)
- Publisher: Conservation International (1st, 2nd, 3rd eds.); Muséum National d'Histoire Naturelle (4th ed.); Re:wild (5th ed.)
- Publication place: United States (5th ed.)
- Media type: Print (Paperback)
- Pages: 975 (Fifth edition)
- ISBN: 978-1-7372851-6-8
- OCLC: 1402201987

Lemurs of Madagascar is a reference work and field guide for the lemurs of Madagascar with descriptions and biogeographic data for the known species. The primary contributor is Russell Mittermeier, president of Conservation International, and the cover art and illustrations are drawn by Stephen D. Nash. Currently in its fifth edition published in 2023, the book provides details about all known lemur species, general information about lemurs and their history, and tips for identifying species. Four related pocket field guides have also been released, containing color illustrations of each species, miniature range maps, and species checklists.

The first edition was published in 1994 and was reviewed favorably in the International Journal of Primatology, Conservation Biology, and Lemur News. Reviewers, including Alison Jolly, praised the book for its depth of coverage, illustrations, and discussion of topics including conservation, evolution, and the recently extinct subfossil lemurs. Each agreed that the book was an excellent resource for a wide audience, including ecotourists and lemur researchers. A lengthy review of the second edition was published in the American Journal of Primatology, where it received similar favorable comments. The third edition was reviewed favorably in Lemur News; the reviewer praised the expanded content of the book but was concerned that the edition was not as portable as its predecessors.

The first edition identified 50 lemur species and subspecies, compared to 71 in the second edition, 101 in the third, 102 in the fourth, and 112 in the fifth. The taxonomy promoted by these books has been questioned by researchers, such as Ian Tattersall, who view these growing quantities of lemur species as insufficiently justified inflation of species numbers.

== Overview ==
Lemurs of Madagascar is intended as a field guide that identifies all of the known lemur species from Madagascar. The first edition was published in 1994 and contained 356 pages. The 520-page second edition was published in 2006, having been followed by the 767-page third edition in the fall of 2010. The 841-page fourth edition, written in French and titled Lémuriens de Madagascar, was published in 2014. Lastly, the fifth and most recent edition is 975 pages long and was published in 2023. The first three editions are published by Conservation International (CI), a non-profit conservation organization headquartered near Washington, D.C.. The fourth is published by the Muséum National d'Histoire Naturelle, and the fifth is published by the US-based nonprofit Re:wild.

For all five editions, Stephen D. Nash has been the illustrator and front cover artist. The lead author for all five editions is Russell A. Mittermeier, president of CI and a primatologist, herpetologist and biological anthropologist. (Note: In the first edition, five authors are listed: Russell A. Mittermeier; Ian Tattersall, a curator in the Division of Anthropology at the American Museum of Natural History; William R. Konstant, the Director of Conservation and Science at the Houston Zoo; David M. Meyers, a researcher and conservationist; and Roderic B. Mast, marine biologist, primatologist, and the founding Director of CI's Madagascar Program. The second edition was authored by Mittermeier, Konstant, Tattersall, and Meyers, as well as seven new authors: Frank Hawkins, the Technical Director for CI in Madagascar; Edward E. Louis, Jr., the conservation geneticist for Omaha's Henry Doorly Zoo's Center for Conservation and Research; Olivier Langrand, CI's Senior Vice President for Africa and Madagascar; Jonah H. Ratsimbazafy, the Scientific Coordinator for the Durrell Wildlife Conservation Trust's Madagascar Program; Rodin Rasoloarison, a field researcher and research coordinator at the German Primate Center; Jörg U. Ganzhorn, professor in the Department of Animal Ecology and Conservation at the University of Hamburg and Chairman for the Madagascar section of the IUCN Species Survival Commission (IUCN/SSC) Primate Specialist Group since 1998; and Serge Rajaobelina, the President of Fanamby, a Malagasy non-governmental environmental organization. Returning authors in the third edition included Mittermeier, Louis, Langrand, Hawkins, Rajaobelina, Ratsimbazafy, and Rasoloarison. New authors included Matthew Richardson, writer and member of the IUCN/SSC Primate Specialist Group; Christoph Schwitzer, the Head of Research at the Bristol Zoo Gardens; Anthony Rylands, a Senior Research Scientist at CI and Deputy Chair of the IUCN/SSC Primate Specialist Group; Christian Roos, a geneticist at the German Primate Center; Peter M. Kappeler, a Professor of Sociobiology and Anthropology at the University of Göttingen in Germany; and James MacKinnon, the Senior Technical Director of CI in Madagascar.) The first edition followed a similar 1982 volume by Ian Tattersall, entitled Primates of Madagascar. All five editions cover the natural history and conservation status for each known species. They also discuss conservation strategies, lemur origins, extinct lemurs, and the history of discoveries made by early European naturalists. The books provide suggestions on where to see each species, as well as checklists to help people keep track of their sightings. The purpose of the book is defined in its introduction: "to facilitate field identification of lemurs, to summarize available data on their ecology, distribution and conservation status, and to stimulate further interest in the survival of these animals in their natural habitats."

Four pocket field guides illustrated by Nash have also been published by CI, providing over 100 species illustrations. Checklists are included with these guides, along with thumbnail range maps for each species. The four guides include two editions of Lemurs of Madagascar Pocket Identification Guide (out of print), Nocturnal Lemurs, and Diurnal and Cathemeral Lemurs. The Nocturnal Lemurs booklet contains 65 species from eight genera. Diurnal and Cathemeral Lemurs hosts 34 species and subspecies from seven genera, along with illustrations to show male and female fur color differences in the genus Eulemur and color morphs for the indri and ruffed lemur species. Fifth and sixth pocket field guides are planned following the publication of the third edition of the field guide.

== Content ==
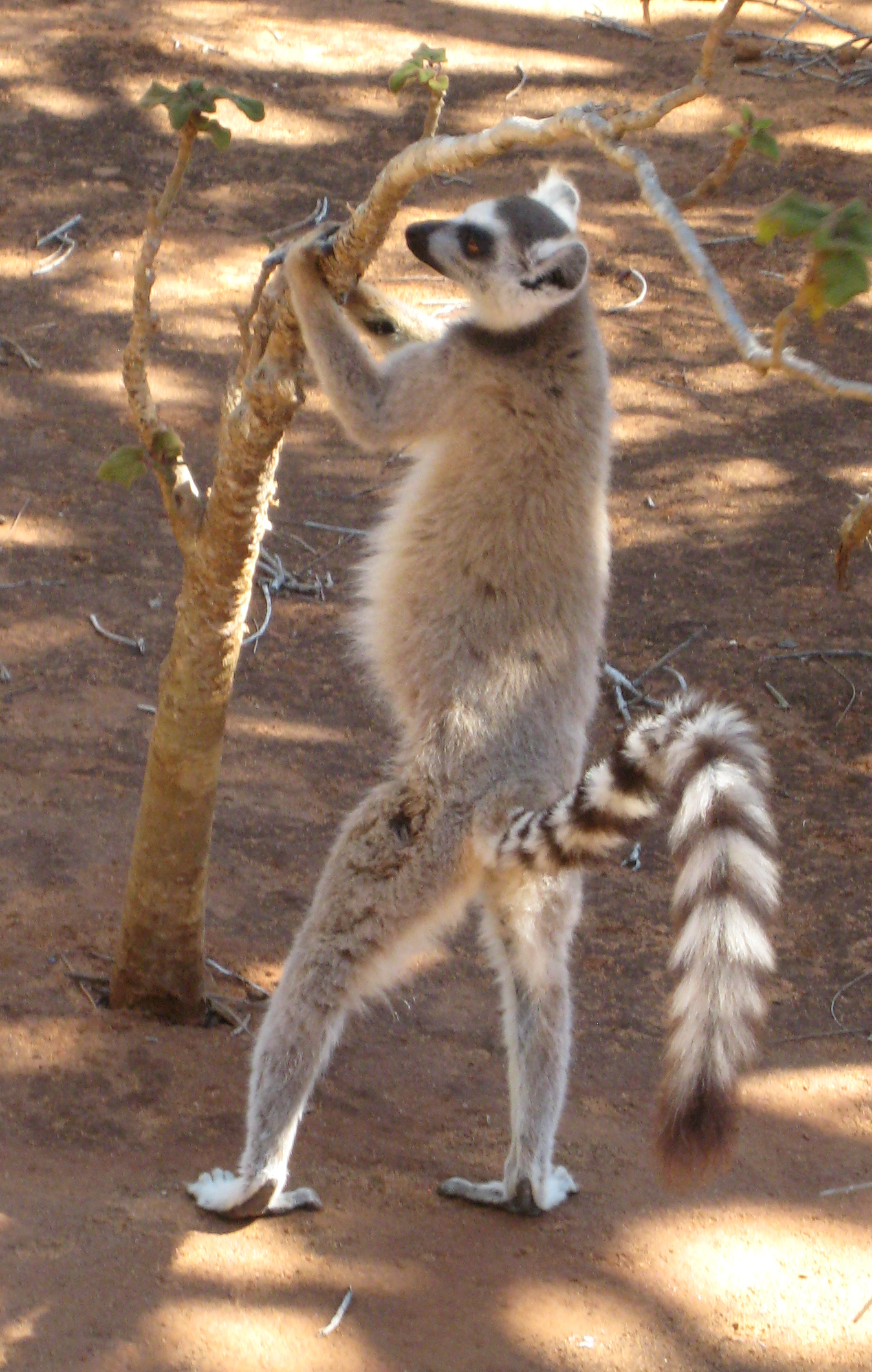
"[Ring-tailed lemur] males use their thorny spurs on their forearms to make small scars in tree trunks that they then anoint with secretions from their scent glands." —Lemurs of Madagascar, Second Edition

The "Introduction" in the first two editions was written by Peter A. Seligmann, Chairman of the Board and CEO of CI, and Mittermeier. (Note: The "Introduction" was written only by Mittermeier in the third edition.) In it, they emphasize Madagascar's primate diversity, summarize conservation efforts, and highlight recent discoveries, while also acknowledging the need for additional research. The chapter entitled "Origins of Lemurs" (Note: Entitled "Origin of the Lemurs" in the third edition) briefly summarizes the theories on how lemurs came to Madagascar and the difficulty in resolving the mystery. "Discovery and Study of the Living Lemurs" reviews the history of exploration, field research, and taxonomic nomenclature of lemurs, starting from the 1625 description of a ring-tailed lemur to contemporary research by Western and Malagasy scientists. "The Extinct Lemurs" discusses the recently extinct subfossil lemurs, including the monkey lemurs, sloth lemurs, and koala lemurs. "Conservation of Lemurs" details the threats lemurs face, such as habitat destruction and hunting for bushmeat, and conservation efforts aimed at their protection, such as programs of the Madagascar Fauna Group and political promises to expand protected areas. In the third edition, a new chapter was added, entitled "Madagascar's Ancient Geological History", written by Maarten de Wit from the University of Cape Town.

[The hairy-eared dwarf lemur] is absolutely one of the more difficult lemur species to find in the wild, and indeed many experts who have worked for decades in Madagascar have yet to see one. ... The best opportunities for viewing it are at the Analamazaotra Special Reserve and the Forêt de Vohidrazana near the village of Fanovana, approximately 12 km east of Andasibe, although its observation in these areas remains very unpredictable.

— Mittermeier, et al., Lemurs of Madagascar, Second Edition

The majority of the book provides accounts of all lemur species known up until the time of publication. In the first and second editions, the chapter "The Living Lemurs" is broken first into sections on families, and then into species clumped together by genus. In the third edition, each family is assigned its own chapter number, separate from "The Living Lemurs" chapter, yet the order and layout are the same. In the second and third editions, all pages within each family section are assigned a colored tab to match those in a quick visual reference present inside the front and back covers. Each species subsection has a distribution map, an illustration or photo (if available), a list of common names in multiple languages (including Malagasy), and species information broken into five sections: "Identification", "Geographic Range", "Natural History", "Conservation Status", and "Where to See It".

The "Identification" section for each species provides a physical description, discussions of variation in size and coloration (morphometrics), and descriptions of distinguishing vocalizations. "Geographic Range" offers textual information to accompany the provided map of known distributions. "Natural History" summarizes what is known about the behavior and ecology of each species. Estimated population densities and distributions, life histories, diet, social structure, and other details are provided when known. "Conservation Status" lists the IUCN Red List of Threatened Species assessment and protected areas in which a species can be found, while also discussing specific threats to each species, the effects of local fady (taboos), the future outlook for species survival, and its coverage within protected areas. Lastly, "Where to See It" aims to promote ecotourism by suggesting lemur watching sites. Suggested modes of transportation are sometimes mentioned as well.

The appendices differ between editions. The first edition has two appendices, respectively entitled "Lemurs Present in Protected Areas" and "Alternative Names for Towns and Sites in Madagascar". In the second edition, three appendices are present: Appendix A, "Maps of Madagascar"; Appendix B, "Biogeographic Regions and Floristic Domains of Madagascar"; and Appendix C, "Key Sites for Watching Lemurs". The third edition added Appendix D, entitled "Primate-watching and Primate Life-listing". All five editions provide a "References" section, with the second edition listing approximately 500 sources and the third listing over 1,100. Following the "References", the first edition provides a section with the color plates. In contrast, the second and third editions provide color illustrations throughout the book.

== Reception ==
In a review of the first edition in the International Journal of Primatology, Lisa Gould spoke favorably of the book, comparing it to Tattersall's The Primates of Madagascar except more portable, affordable, and up-to-date. She singled out the chapter "The Extinct Lemurs" and the accompanying reconstructions by Nash as "simply fascinating". Gould described Nash's artwork as "exquisite" and concluded by calling the book "extremely useful" for both tourists and researchers. The book was also briefly reviewed in College & Research Libraries News by George Eberhart. The review noted CI's promotion of ecotourism while also providing a count of the book's illustrations: 35 color plates, 50 distribution maps, and 135 drawings of postures and behaviors. (Note: The second edition would later feature over 200 illustrations.)

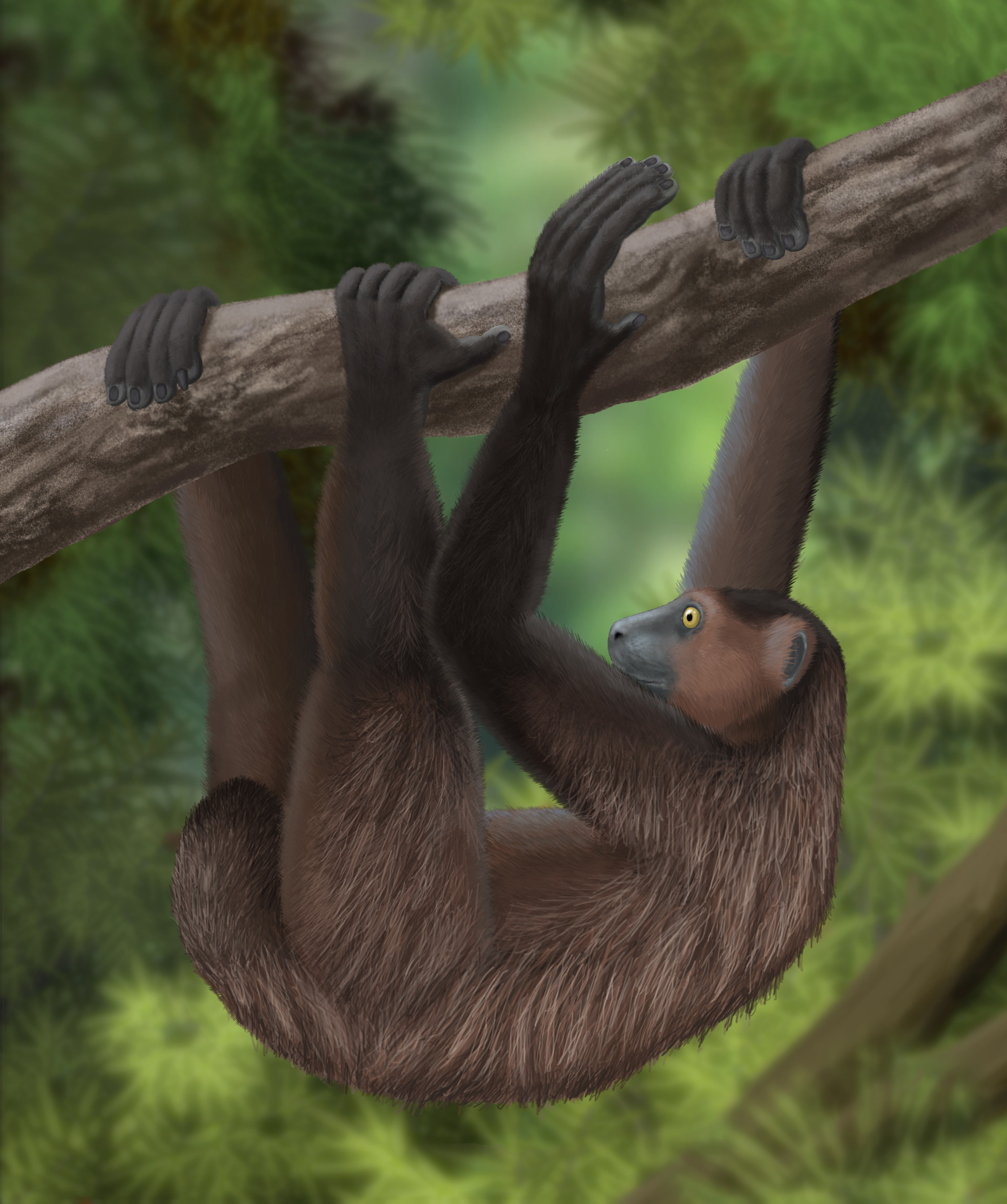
Babakotia radofilai, one of the extinct giant lemur species described in the chapter entitled "The Extinct Lemurs"

Writing in Lemur News, Alison Jolly praised the first edition for its "contribution to knowledge in general" and "its effect on its intended audience." Like Gould, Jolly praised the work as a field guide, as well as Nash's illustrations. She noted the attraction of Nash's subfossil lemur reconstruction, claiming that it was "rapidly becoming one of the most pirated single book illustration on the primate lecture-slide circuit." Jolly praised the thoroughness of the natural history information provided for each species, including recently described species, noting that the information covered existing knowledge better than any other published literature, even when only a single paragraph was provided for poorly known species. The book was recommended not only for lemur specialists, but also for tourists, hoping it would spark an interest in ecotourism in impoverished Madagascar. The checklist of species and the information on where to most easily spot them earned a special mention from Jolly. Finally, the "most significant and most appreciative" audience Jolly mentioned was the Malagasy researchers, to whom Mittermeier reportedly gave 50 copies of the book during a workshop in 1995.

A review from Conservation Biology by Joelisoa Ratsirarson referred to the book as a "remarkable achievement" for its up-to-date information, and for being the first comprehensive lemur field guide. Emphasizing many of the same highlights as Gould and Jolly, Ratsirarson also noted the inclusion of captive management information, unpublished details, and the use of common names in English, French, German, and Malagasy. His critique focused on the organization of the illustrations in relation to the text, the lack of an index, and a desire for more information about the roles lemurs play in their ecosystem. Though he praised it for being useful to tourists, researchers, students, resource managers, and conservationists, he expressed concern over its lack of availability in the bookstores of Madagascar.

The completely revised second edition was reviewed in detail in the American Journal of Primatology by Stacey Tecot. As with reviews of the previous edition, the chapter on subfossil lemurs and its illustrations were noted as one of the more "fascinating" parts of the book. Tecot suggested two additions for the next edition: the need for information about the processes of island biogeography and expansion on captive conservation programs aside from the Duke Lemur Center, particularly at the Lemur Conservation Foundation and St. Catherines Island. A subject index was also recommended, along with better referencing of the figures and illustrations. Otherwise, the book was praised as being better than other field guides due to its inclusion of seemingly obscure yet important details, such as how to get to lemur watching sites, travel time, where to stay, mentions of lesser-known sites, listings of species to be seen, best times to observe, and the number of habituated lemur groups in each area. Tecot noted that the lemur checklist promoted competitive lemur watching, similar to birdwatching, and that the color-coded sections assisted in "on-the-fly species identification." Although very satisfied with the information provided for each species, Tecot commended the promise made in this edition to more extensively cover the published literature in the upcoming third edition. Like its predecessor, the second edition was praised as an excellent tool for ecotourists and researchers. It was also noted for its attempt to promote ecotourism as a conservation strategy.

The third edition was reviewed in Lemur News by Alex Dunkel. He praised the increased level of detail in the new edition, which adds additional information on geology, the history of lemur research, and aspects of lemur biology. Dunkel expressed that steep challenges facing lemur conservation efforts due to political and economic instability in Madagascar made the new edition especially important. However, he worried that the increased size of the book made it less portable than its predecessors.

== Impact on lemur taxonomy ==
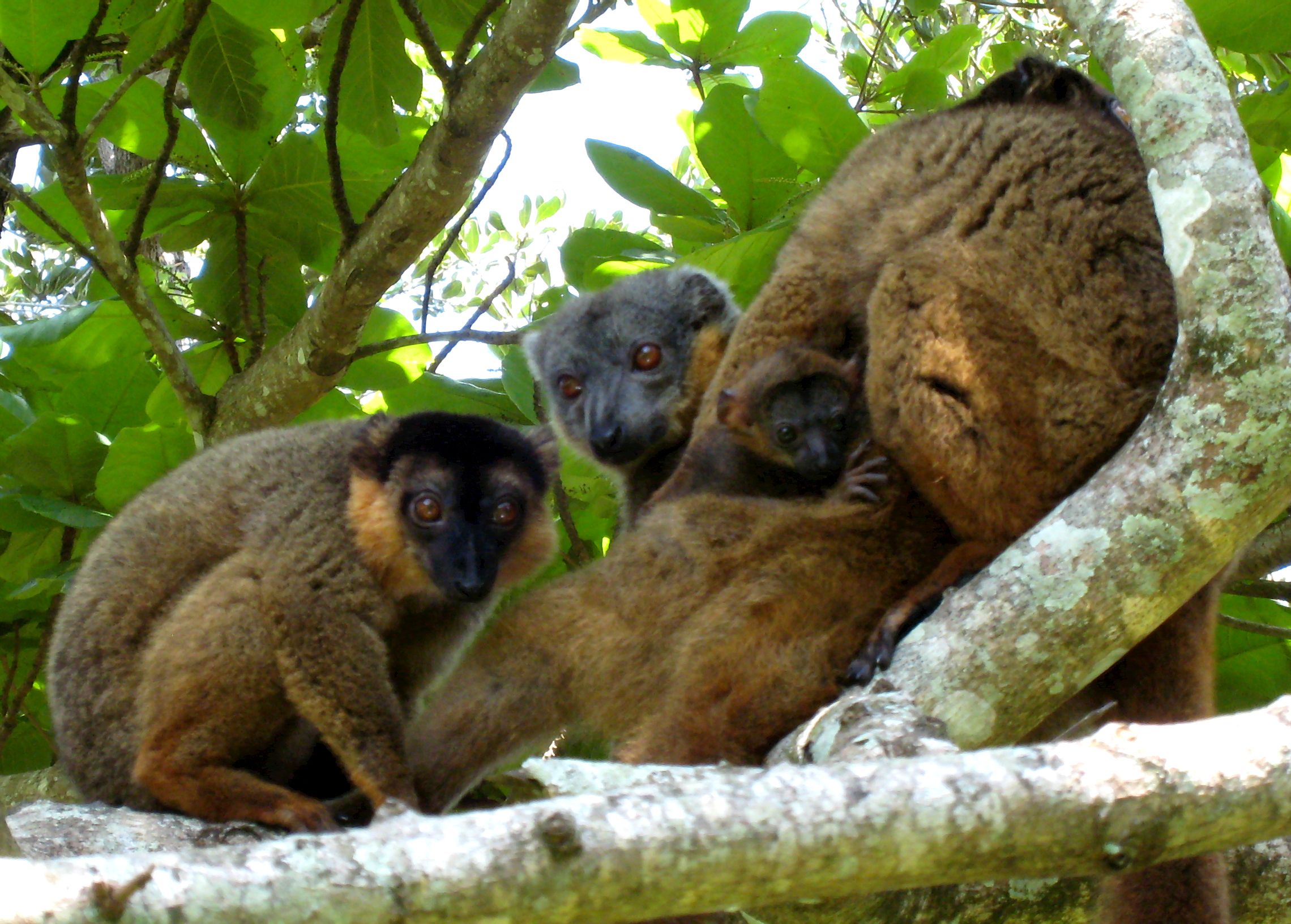
Collared brown lemurs were treated as a subspecies in the first edition, but elevated to full species status in the second.

While the first edition recognized 50 lemur taxa (32 species and 25 subspecies), the second edition recognized 71 lemur taxa (68 species and 5 subspecies) just 12 years later. The second edition followed the recommendations of Colin Groves in the third edition of Mammal Species of the World from 2005 by recognizing newly identified nocturnal species and raising many former subspecies to species status. Tattersall's book Primates of Madagascar from 1982, by comparison, listed only 22 extant species and 29 extant subspecies. Following the publication of the second edition, Nick Garbutt recognized 87 species and 5 subspecies in his book Mammals of Madagascar.

Not all lemur researchers agree with the species promotions supported by these books. Researchers such as Tattersall and Anne D. Yoder, director of the Duke Lemur Center, have raised concerns about taxonomic inflation. In particular, Tattersall has noted a steep decline in polytypic lemur species, or species with defined subspecies, starting with the first edition of Lemurs of Madagascar and becoming more pronounced in the second edition. He noted that more than half of the new species added in the second edition were promoted subspecies and questioned whether Madagascar could produce so many monotypic species.

Prior to the release of the third edition of Lemurs of Madagascar, many of the major contributors, as well as Colin Groves, teamed up in 2008 to compile an updated lemur species list, published under the title "Lemur diversity in Madagascar" in the International Journal of Primatology. In it, 99 lemur taxa were recognized (97 species and 3 subspecies). The third edition went on to recognize 101 lemur taxa (97 species and 6 subspecies) and suggested that future research could reveal as many as 110 to 125 taxa.
