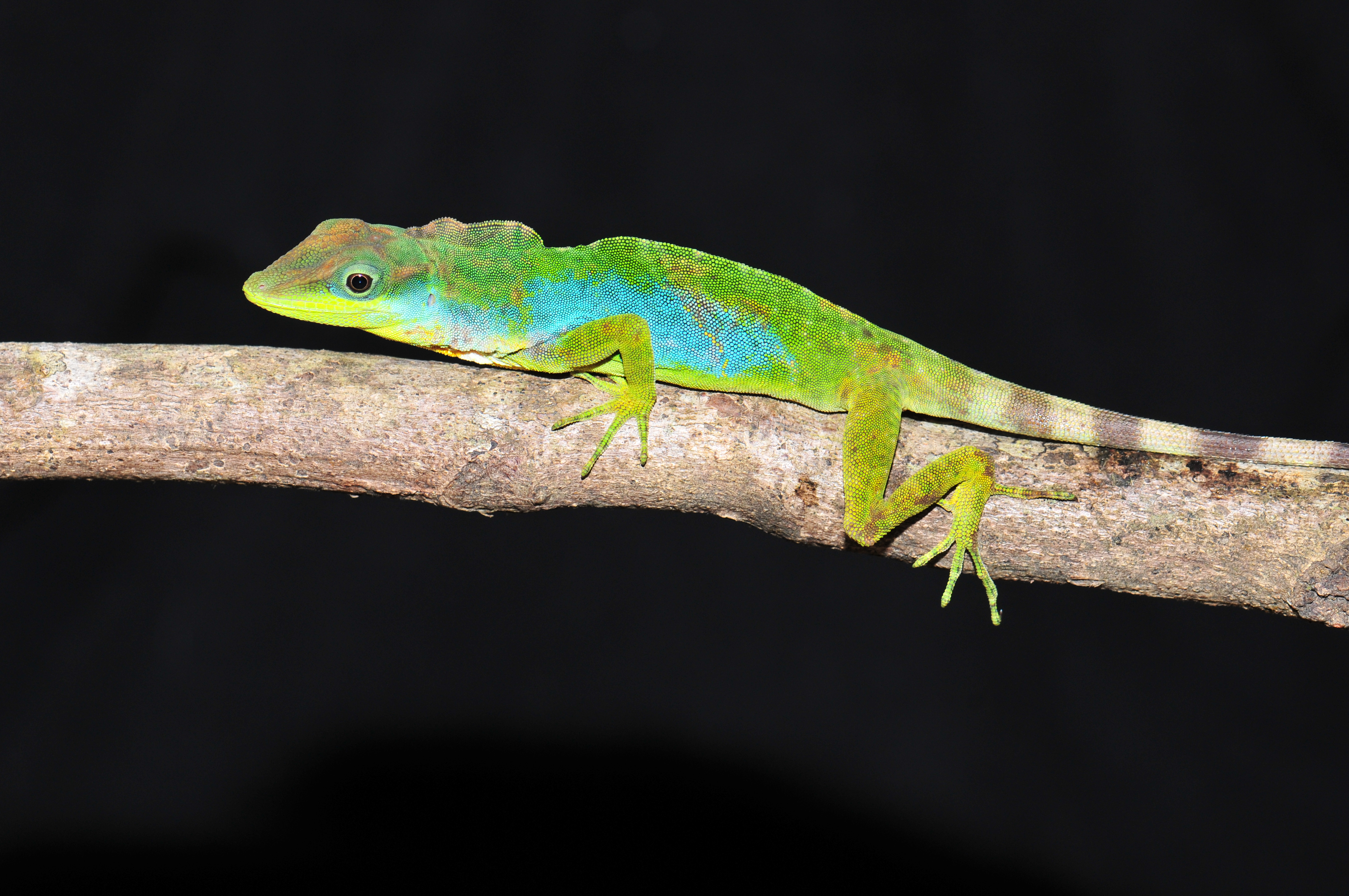
- Anolis kunayalae

Scientific classification
- Kingdom: Animalia
- Phylum: Chordata
- Class: Reptilia
- Order: Squamata
- Suborder: Iguania
- Family: Dactyloidae
- Genus: Anolis
- Species: A. kunalayae

Binomial name
- Anolis kunalayae Hulebak, Poe, Ibáñez, & Williams, 2007

= Anolis kunalayae =

Species of lizard

Anolis kunalayae is a species of lizard in the family Dactyloidae. The species is found in Panama.
