= P. vanzolinii =

P. vanzolinii may refer to:

- Phenacosaurus vanzolinii, a lizard species
- Phrynomedusa vanzolinii, an amphibian species endemic to Brazil

== See also ==
- Vanzolinii (disambiguation)
