= Anolis urraoi =

Scientific classification
- Kingdom: Animalia
- Phylum: Chordata
- Order: Squamata
- Suborder: Iguania
- Family: Anolidae
- Genus: Anolis
- Species: A. urraoi

Binomial name
- Anolis urraoi Grisales-Martinez, Velasco, Bolivar, Williams, & Daza, 2017

Species of lizard

Anolis urraoi, the Urrao anole, is a species of lizard in the family Dactyloidae. The species is found in Colombia.
