= Anolis ibague =

Conservation status
- Data Deficient (IUCN 3.1)

Scientific classification
- Kingdom: Animalia
- Phylum: Chordata
- Class: Reptilia
- Order: Squamata
- Suborder: Iguania
- Family: Dactyloidae
- Genus: Anolis
- Species: A. ibague

Binomial name
- Anolis ibague Williams, 1975

Species of lizard

Anolis ibague, the Ibague anole, is a species of lizard in the family Dactyloidae. The species is found in Colombia.
