= Anolis lamari =

Conservation status
- Data Deficient (IUCN 3.1)

Scientific classification
- Kingdom: Animalia
- Phylum: Chordata
- Class: Reptilia
- Order: Squamata
- Suborder: Iguania
- Family: Dactyloidae
- Genus: Anolis
- Species: A. lamari

Binomial name
- Anolis lamari E. Williams, 1992

Synonyms
- Dactyloa lamari (E. Williams, 1992)

Species of lizard

Anolis lamari is a species of lizard in the family Dactyloidae. The species is endemic to Colombia.

== Etymology ==
The specific name, lamari, is in honor of American Herpetologist William Wylly Lamar.

== Description ==
The dewlap of A. lamari is uniformly yellow-orange. The head has a parietal knob, which is preceded by a line of enlarged scales. However, the head scales lack minute tubercles. The flanks lack reticulations.

== Geographic range ==
A. lamari is found on the eastern slopes of the Cordillera Oriental, in Meta Department, Colombia.

== Habitat ==
The preferred natural habitat of A. lamari is forest, at altitudes around 1,600 m (5,200 ft).

== Reproduction ==
A. lamari is oviparous.
