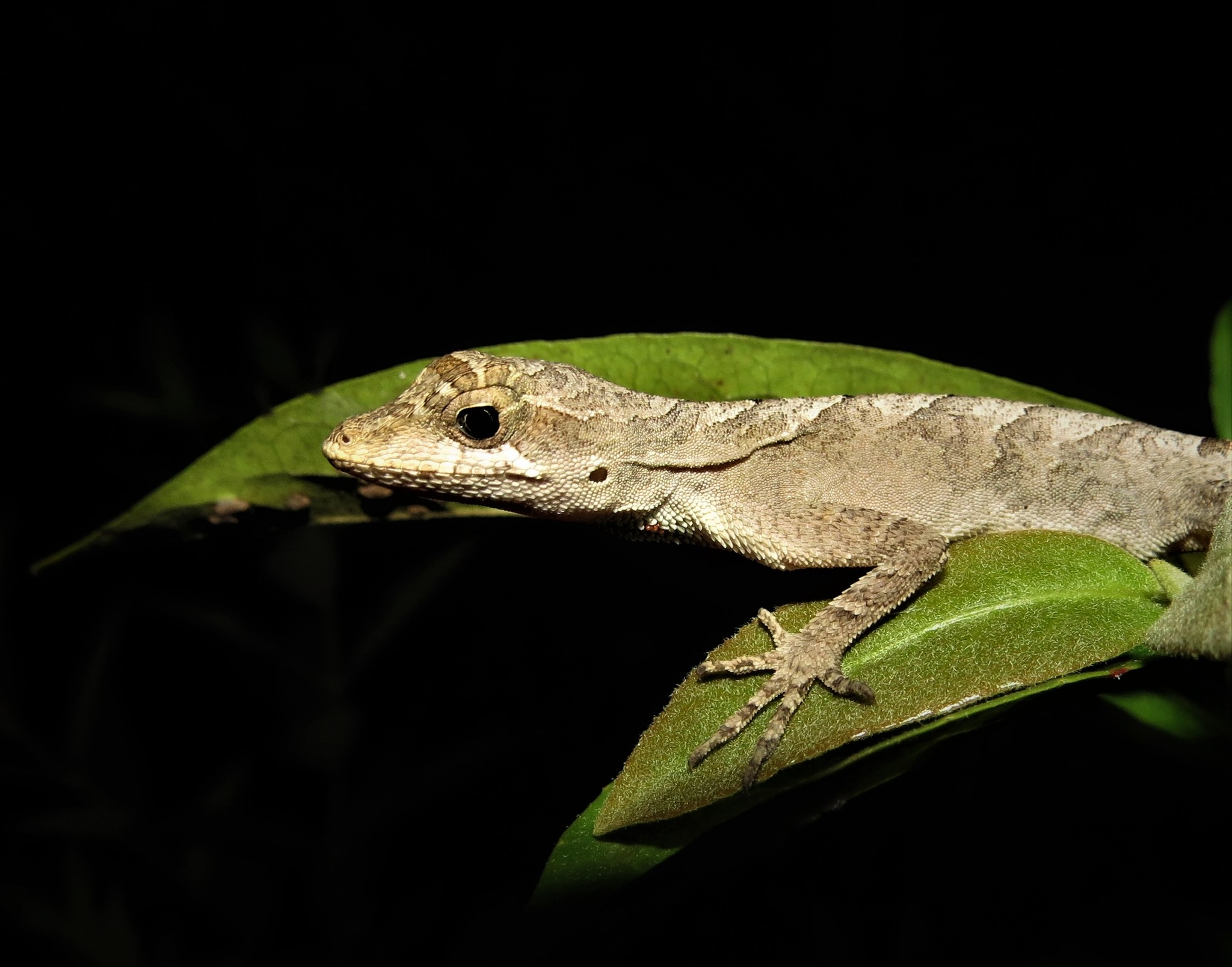

Conservation status
- Least Concern (IUCN 3.1)

Scientific classification
- Kingdom: Animalia
- Phylum: Chordata
- Class: Reptilia
- Order: Squamata
- Suborder: Iguania
- Family: Dactyloidae
- Genus: Anolis
- Species: A. brasiliensis

Binomial name
- Anolis brasiliensis Vanzolini & Williams, 1970

= Anolis brasiliensis =

Species of lizard

Anolis brasiliensis, the Brazilian anole, is a species of lizard in the family Dactyloidae. The species is found in Brazil.
