= Anolis dolichocephalus =

Scientific classification
- Kingdom: Animalia
- Phylum: Chordata
- Class: Reptilia
- Order: Squamata
- Suborder: Iguania
- Family: Dactyloidae
- Genus: Anolis
- Species: A. dolichocephalus

Binomial name
- Anolis dolichocephalus Williams, 1963

Species of lizard

Anolis dolichocephalus, the La Hotte long-snouted anole or Place Negre anole, is a species of lizard in the family Dactyloidae. The species is found in Haiti.
