= Anolis danieli =

Conservation status
- Least Concern (IUCN 3.1)

Scientific classification
- Kingdom: Animalia
- Phylum: Chordata
- Class: Reptilia
- Order: Squamata
- Suborder: Iguania
- Family: Anolidae
- Genus: Anolis
- Species: A. danieli

Binomial name
- Anolis danieli E. Williams, 1988

Synonyms
- Dactyloa danielsi (E. Williams, 1988)

Species of lizard

Anolis danieli is a species of lizard in the family Dactyloidae. The species is endemic to Colombia.

== Etymology ==
The specific name, danieli, is in honor of Colombian monk Brother Daniel Gonzalez Patiño (1909–1988), who was Director of the Museo de Historia Natural, Instituto de La Salle in Bogotá.

== Habitat ==
The preferred natural habitat of Anolis danieli is forest, at altitudes of 1,200–1,800 m (3,940–5,910 ft).

== Description ==
A large anole with a long tail, Anolis danielsi may attain a snout-to-vent length (SVL) of 12 cm (4.7 in), and a tail length of 33 cm (13 in).

== Reproduction ==
Anolis danieli is oviparous.
