= Anolis antioquiae =

Conservation status
- Near Threatened (IUCN 3.1)

Scientific classification
- Kingdom: Animalia
- Phylum: Chordata
- Class: Reptilia
- Order: Squamata
- Suborder: Iguania
- Family: Dactyloidae
- Genus: Anolis
- Species: A. antioquiae

Binomial name
- Anolis antioquiae Williams, 1985

Species of lizard

Anolis antioquiae, the Antiodlula anole or Antioquia anole, is a species of lizard in the family Dactyloidae. The species is found in Colombia.
