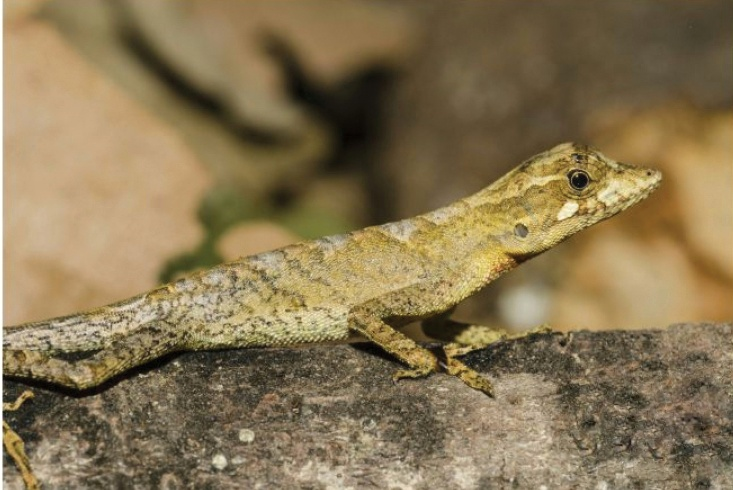

Conservation status
- Least Concern (IUCN 3.1)

Scientific classification
- Kingdom: Animalia
- Phylum: Chordata
- Class: Reptilia
- Order: Squamata
- Suborder: Iguania
- Family: Dactyloidae
- Genus: Anolis
- Species: A. planiceps

Binomial name
- Anolis planiceps Troschel, 1848

Synonyms
- Anolis planiceps Troschel, 1848; Anolis eewi Roze, 1958; Anolis chrysolepis planiceps — Vanzolini & E.E. Williams, 1970; Anolis planiceps — D'Angiolella et al., 2011

= Anolis planiceps =

Species of lizard

Anolis planiceps, commonly known as the golden-scaled anole, orange-fanned leaf-litter anole, or goldenscale anole, is a species of lizard in the family Dactyloidae. The species is found in Venezuela, Guyana, Brazil, and Trinidad.

== Habitat ==
The preferred natural habitat of A. planiceps is forest, at altitudes of 40–1,800 m (130–5,910 ft).

== Description ==
A. planiceps may attain a snout-to-vent length (SVL) of 7.5 cm (3.0 in).

== Reproduction ==
A. planiceps is oviparous.

== Etymology ==
The synonym, A. eewi, was named in honor of American herpetologist Ernest Edward Williams, a wordplay on his initials, E.E.W.
