= Anolis caquetae =

Conservation status
- Data Deficient (IUCN 3.1)

Scientific classification
- Kingdom: Animalia
- Phylum: Chordata
- Class: Reptilia
- Order: Squamata
- Suborder: Iguania
- Family: Dactyloidae
- Genus: Anolis
- Species: A. caquetae

Binomial name
- Anolis caquetae Wiliams, 1974

Species of lizard

Anolis caquetae, the Caqueta anole, is a species of lizard in the family Dactyloidae. The species is found in Colombia.
