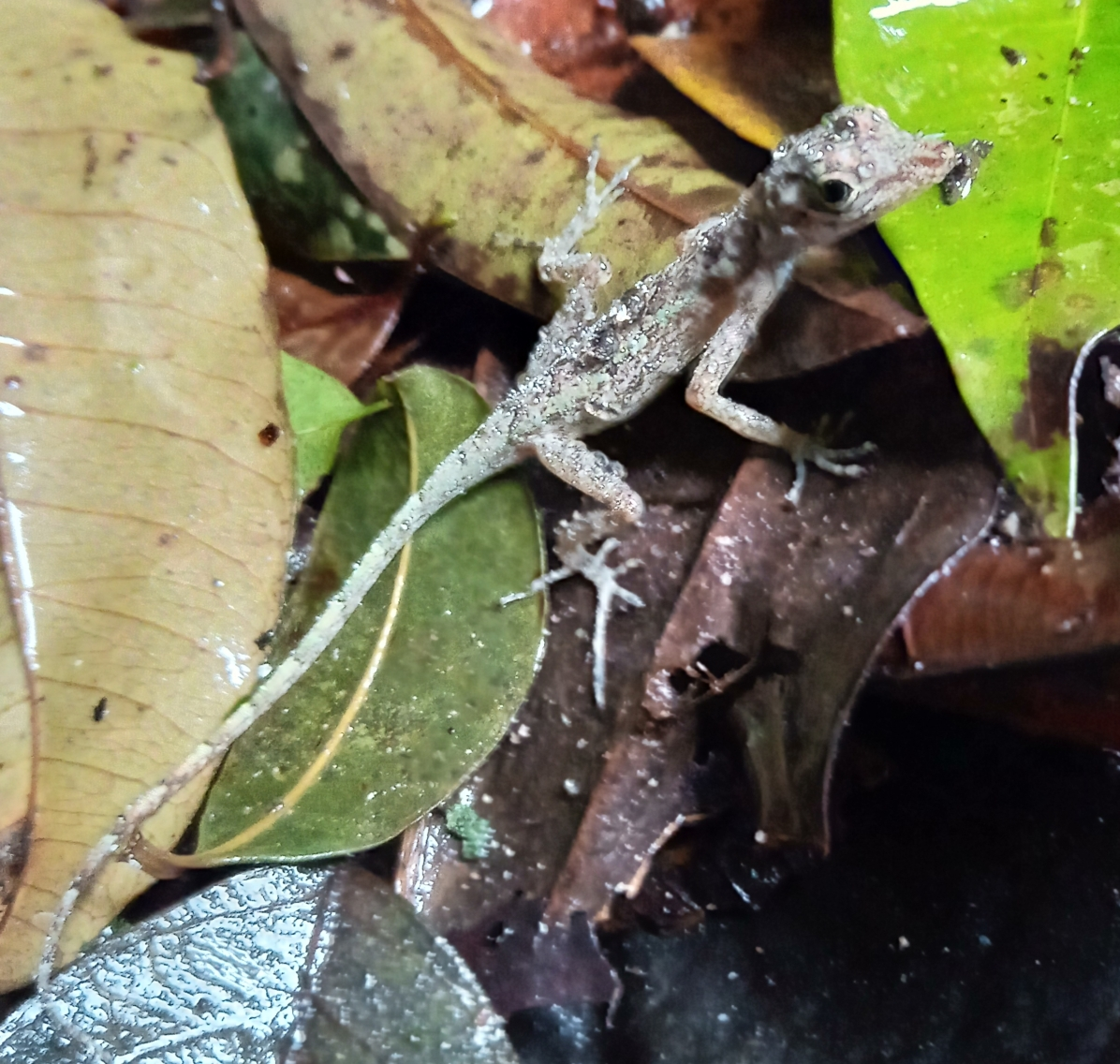

Conservation status
- Near Threatened (IUCN 3.1)

Scientific classification
- Kingdom: Animalia
- Phylum: Chordata
- Class: Reptilia
- Order: Squamata
- Suborder: Iguania
- Family: Dactyloidae
- Genus: Anolis
- Species: A. marcanoi

Binomial name
- Anolis marcanoi E. Williams, 1975

Synonyms
- Audantia marcanoi (E. Williams, 1975)

= Anolis marcanoi =

Species of lizard

Anolis marcanoi, also known commonly as Marcano's anole and the red-fanned stout anole, is a species of lizard in the family Dactyloidae. The species is endemic to the Dominican Republic.

== Etymology ==
The specific epithet, marcanoi, is in honor of Dominican botanist, entomologist, herpetologist, speleologist, and researcher Eugenio de Jesús Marcano Fondeur.

== Habitat ==
The preferred natural habitats of Anolis marcanoi are forest and shrubland, at altitudes of 200–1,800 m (660–5,910 ft).

== Reproduction ==
Anolis marcanoi is oviparous.
