= Anolis etheridgei =

Conservation status
- Vulnerable (IUCN 3.1)

Scientific classification
- Kingdom: Animalia
- Phylum: Chordata
- Class: Reptilia
- Order: Squamata
- Suborder: Iguania
- Family: Dactyloidae
- Genus: Anolis
- Species: A. etheridgei

Binomial name
- Anolis etheridgei E. Williams, 1962

Synonyms
- Anolis darlingtoni Cochran, 1939; Anolis etheridgei E. Williams, 1962 (nomen substitutum); Chamaelinorops etheridgei — Nicholson et al., 2012; Deiroptyx etheridgei — Nicholson et al., 2018

Species of lizard

Anolis etheridgei, also known commonly as Etheridge's anole and the montane bush anole, is a species of lizard in the family Dactyloidae. The species is endemic to the Dominican Republic.

== Etymology ==
The specific name, etheridgei, is in honor of American herpetologist Richard Emmett Etheridge.

== Geographic range ==
A. etheridgei occurs in the Cordillera Central, Dominican Republic.

== Habitat ==
The preferred natural habitat of A. etheridgei is forest, at altitudes of 550–2,440 m (1,800–8,010 ft).

== Description ==
A small anole, A. etheridgei may attain a snout-to-vent length of 4.3 cm (1.7 in). The tail is long, more than twice SVL. The dewlap is small and white, and the iris of the eye is blue.

== Diet ==
A. etheridgei preys upon invertebrates.

== Reproduction ==
A. etheridgei is oviparous.
