= Russell Mittermeier =

American primatologist and herpetologist

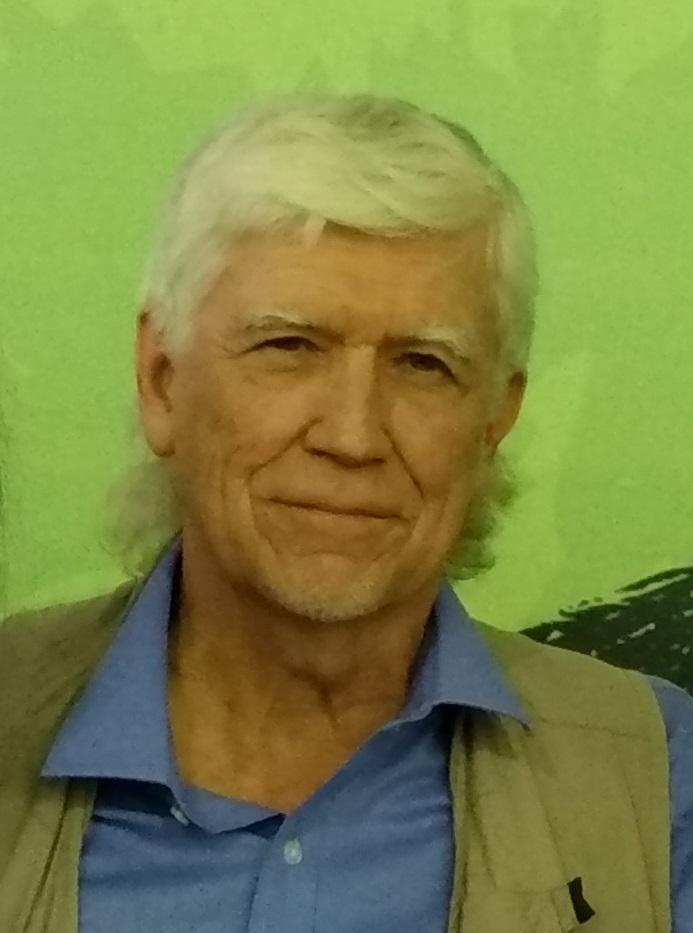
- Born: Russell Alan Mittermeier; November 8, 1949 (age 76); Bronx, New York, United States
- Education: Dartmouth College; Harvard
- Known for: Biological Diversity and Ecosystem Conservation
- Scientific career
- Fields: Anthropology
- Workplaces: Global Wildlife Conservation

Russell Alan Mittermeier (born November 8, 1949) is an American primatologist and herpetologist. He has written several books for both popular and scientist audiences, and has authored more than 300 scientific papers.

== Biography ==
Russell A. Mittermeier is Chief Conservation Officer of Re:wild (formerly Global Wildlife Conservation). He served as President of Conservation International from 1989 to 2014, then Executive Vice-chair from 2014 to 2017. He specialises in the fields of primatology, herpetology, biodiversity and conservation of tropical forests. He has undertaken research in more than 30 countries, including Amazonia (particularly Brazil and Suriname) and Madagascar.

Since 1977, Mittermeier has served as Chairman of the IUCN-World Conservation Union Species Survival Commission Primate Specialist Group, and he has been a member of the Steering Committee of the Species Survival Commission since 1982. Before working for Conservation International, he spent 11 years at the World Wildlife Fund in the United States, starting as Director of their Primate Program and ending up as vice-president for Science. He also served as an IUCN-World Conservation Union Regional Councillor for the period 2004–2012, was elected as one of IUCN-World Conservation Union's four vice-presidents for the period 2009–2012, and then was elected a lifetime Honorary IUCN-World Conservation Union Member in 2012. He also chaired the first World Bank Task Force on Biodiversity in 1988, which was instrumental in introducing the term "biodiversity" to that institution.

He became an adjunct professor at the Stony Brook University in 1978, a research associate at the Museum of Comparative Zoology at Harvard University for more than two decades, and has been President of the Margot Marsh Biodiversity Foundation since 1996. More recently, he was instrumental in the creation of the 25 million Euro Mohamed bin Zayed Species Conservation Fund, a new species-focused fund based in Abu Dhabi, and serves as a member of its Advisory Committee.

In the late 1970s, Mittermeier undertook one of the first studies of the critically endangered northern muriqui woolly spider monkeys in what would become the Caratinga Biological Station. Mittermeier has been particularly interested in the discovery and description of species new to science. He has described a total of 14 new species (three turtles, four lemurs, an African monkey, and six Amazonian monkeys) and has eight species named in his honor (three frogs, a lizard, two lemurs, a monkey, and an ant). The most recent (2014) of these is Mittermeier's saki, Pithecia mittermeieri, a monkey from the Brazilian Amazon. The lizard, Anolis williamsmittermeierorum, is named in honor of Mittermeier and American language herpetologist Ernest E. Williams.

Mittermeier has also been a leader in promoting species-focused ecotourism, particularly primate-watching and primate life-listing, and more recently turtle-watching and turtle life-listing, following the very successful model of the bird-watching community. To facilitate this, he launched a Tropical Field Guide Series and a Pocket Guide Series focused heavily on primates, but including a number of other species groups as well. More recent publications include The Tropical Field Guide Series are Lemurs of Madagascar, Third Edition (2010) and Primates of West Africa (2011) with a French edition of the Lemurs of Madagascar released in 2014. His own primate life-list, now totaling more than 350 species, is among the largest in the world.

Mittermeier has also been a founding advisory board member of vildwerk. since 2022. vildwerk. is a nonprofit organization inspiring conservation awareness through dance.

Mittermeier was born in New York City. He received his B.A.(summa cum laude, Phi Beta Kappa) from Dartmouth college and Ph.D. from Harvard University in biological anthropology for a thesis entitled, "Distribution, Synecology, and Conservation of Suriname Monkeys" in 1977.

== Awards and honors ==
Mittermeier's awards and honors include:

- The Order of the Golden Ark from His Royal Highness Prince Bernhard of the Netherlands (1995)
- The Grand Order of the Southern Cross from the President of Brazil (1997)
- The Cincinnati Zoo Wildlife Conservation Award (1997)
- The Brazilian Muriqui Prize (1997)
- The Grand Sash and Order of the Yellow Star from the President of Suriname Jules Wijdenbosch(1998)
- The Order of the Southern Cross of President Fernando Henrique Cardoso of Brazil (1998)
- The second annual Aldo Leopold Award from the American Society of Mammalogists (ASM), 2004.
- Sigma Xi's John P. McGovern Science and Society Award (2007)
- The Sir Peter Scott Award of IUCN's Species Survival Commission (2008)
- The Association of Tropical Biology's Special Recognition Award for Conservation (2008)
- The twelfth annual Roger Tory Peterson Memorial Award from the Harvard Museum of Natural History (2009)
- Honorary Degree from Eckerd College (St. Petersburg, Florida) in recognition of his conservation work.
- The Indianapolis Prize for Conservation (2018)

== Selected bibliography ==
Russell Mittermeier's writing includes 36 books and more than 700 scientific and popular articles. Among his books are The Trilogy Megadiversity (1997), Hotspots (2000) and Wilderness Areas (2002), Wildlife Spectacles (2003), Hotspots Revisited (2004), Transboundary Conservation (2005), Lemurs of Madagascar (1994; 2006; 2010), Pantanal: South America's Wetland Jewel (2005), A Climate for Life (2008), The Wealth of Nature: Ecosystems, Biodiversity and Human Well-Being (2009), Freshwater: The Essence of Life (2010), Oceans: Heart of our Blue Planet (2011) and The Handbook of the Mammals of the World (Vol. 3 Primates) (2013).

- Paint It Wild: Paint & See Activity Book (Discover The Rainforest, Vol. 1) (1991), introduction by Mike Roberts and Russell Mittermeier, written by Gad Meiron and Randall Stone, illustrated by Donna Reynolds and Tim Racer
- Sticker Safari: Sticker And Activity Book (Discover The Rainforest, Vol. 2) (1991), introduction by Mike Roberts and Russell Mittermeier, written by Gad Meiron and Randall Stone, illustrated by Donna Reynolds and Tim Racer
- Wonders In The Wild: Activity Book (Discover The Rainforest, Vol. 3) (1991), introduction by Mike Roberts and Russell Mittermeier, written by Gad Meiron and Randall Stone, illustrated by Donna Reynolds and Tim Racer
- Ronald McDonald and the Jewel of the Amazon Kingdom: Storybook (Discover The Rainforest, Vol. 4) (1991), introduction by Mike Roberts and Russell Mittermeier, written by Gad Meiron and Randall Stone, illustrated by Donna Reynolds and Tim Racer
