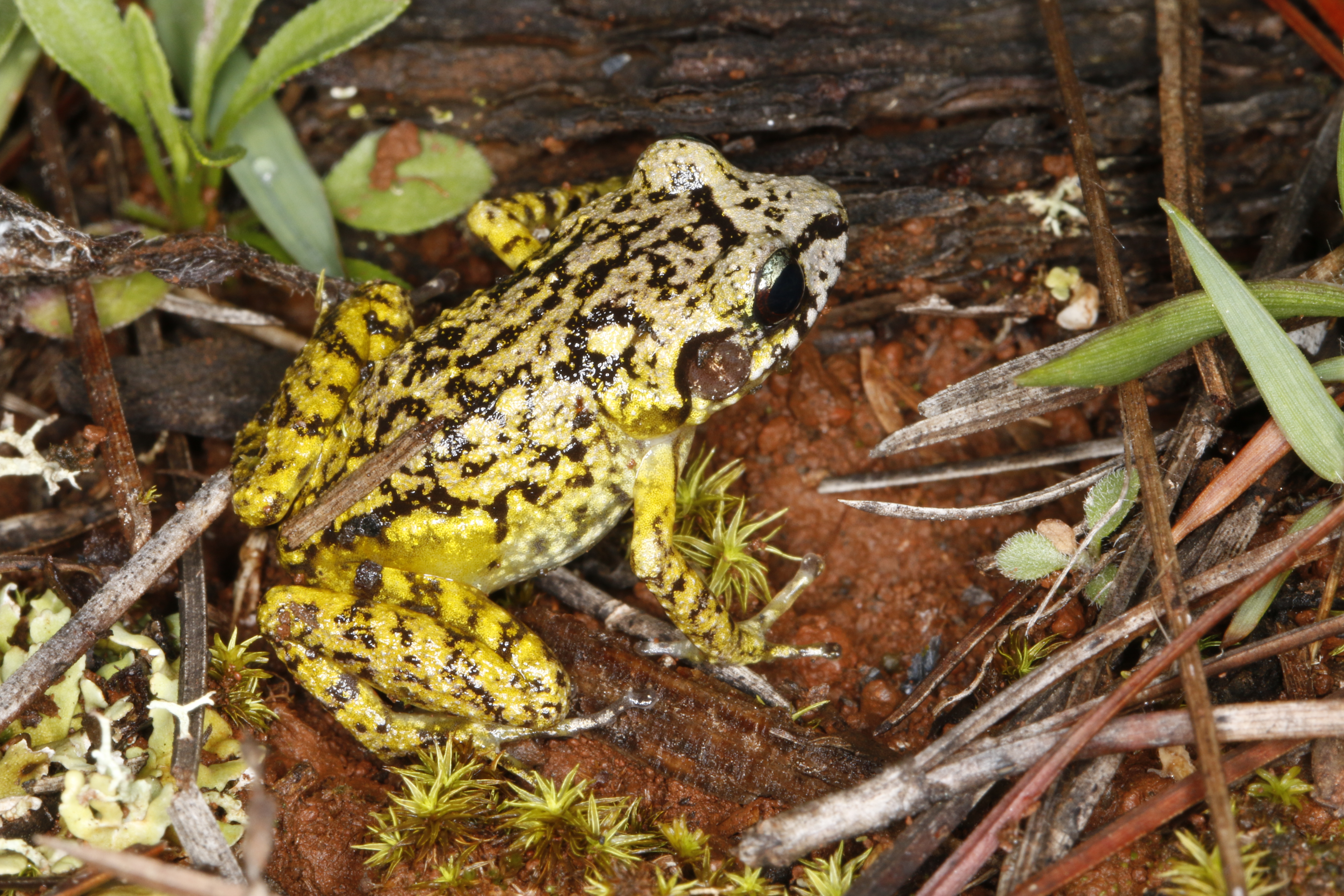

Conservation status
- Endangered (IUCN 3.1)

Scientific classification
- Kingdom: Animalia
- Phylum: Chordata
- Class: Amphibia
- Order: Anura
- Clade: Brachycephaloidea
- Family: Eleutherodactylidae
- Genus: Eleutherodactylus
- Species: E. leoncei

Binomial name
- Eleutherodactylus leoncei Shreve and Williams, 1963

= Southern pastel frog =

Species of amphibian

The southern pastel frog or Hispaniola robber frog (Eleutherodactylus leoncei) is a species of frog in the family Eleutherodactylidae. It is endemic to Hispaniola and known from the Massif de la Selle, both in the Dominican Republic and in Haiti. Its natural habitats are upland pine forests. Males call from the ground. It is threatened by habitat loss caused by logging and agriculture. It is known from the Sierra de Bahoruco National Park (Dominican Republic), but habitat degradation is occurring in this area too.

== Taxonomic history ==
E. leoncei was described by Shreve & Williams in 1963. The type-locality for the species is Foret des Pins, near Pic La Selle in Haiti. The holotype (YPM 1167) is an adult female collected the 26 February 1959 by P. S. Humphrey.

== Distribution and habitat ==
The type series and the majority of subsequent specimens were collected during the day under rocks and logs in pine (Pinus occidentalis) and hardwood forests, while one was discovered crossing a road in a pine forest at night.

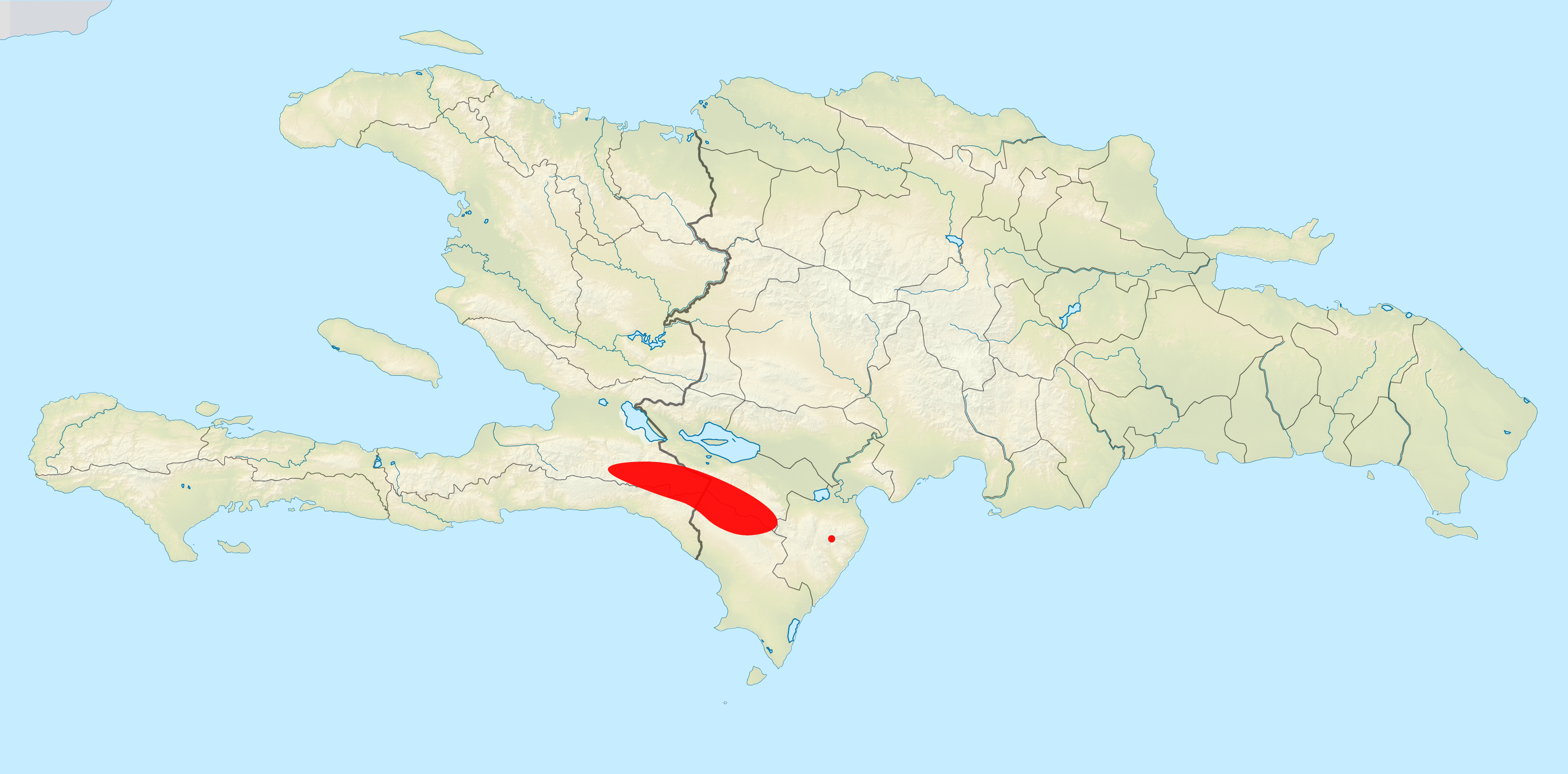
Distribution of Eleutherodactylus leoncei (known range in red).

This species is restricted to the Massif de la Selle in Haiti, and Sierra de Bahoruco in the Dominican Republic, Hispaniola. It has been recorded from 1,182 to 2,303 m asl.

It is considered a terrestrial species that lives in upland pine forests, preferring shady spots and calling from the ground. It will not tolerate disturbances to its natural environment. It breeds by direct development and lays its eggs on the ground.

== Conservation ==
The species is found in Parque Nacional Sierra de Bahoruco in the Dominican Republic, but the region is poorly protected, and habitat loss is ongoing. It is important to improve the management of existing protected areas and maintain the remaining habitat.

The main threat is habitat loss caused by logging (charcoaling) and slash-and-burn agriculture carried on by local communities. This region has been recently affected by multiple forest fires, some of which have been caused by illegal human activities within the park boundaries.

Because of a projected population loss of more than 80% in the next ten years due to extreme destruction of the species' habitat in Hispaniola, the species is listed as Endangered by the IUCN.

== Images ==
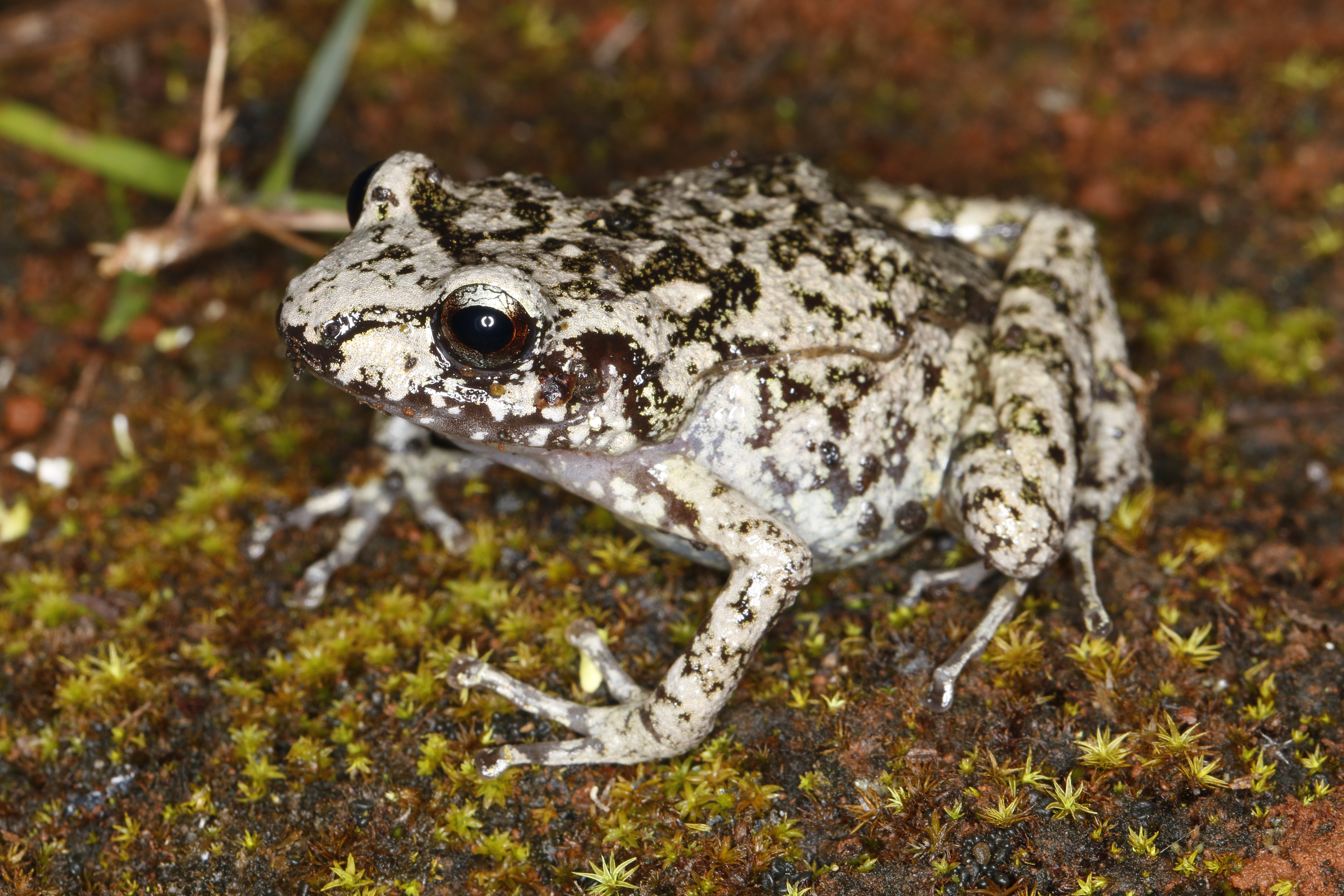
Adult female of Eleutherodactylus leoncei from Sierra de Bahoruco.

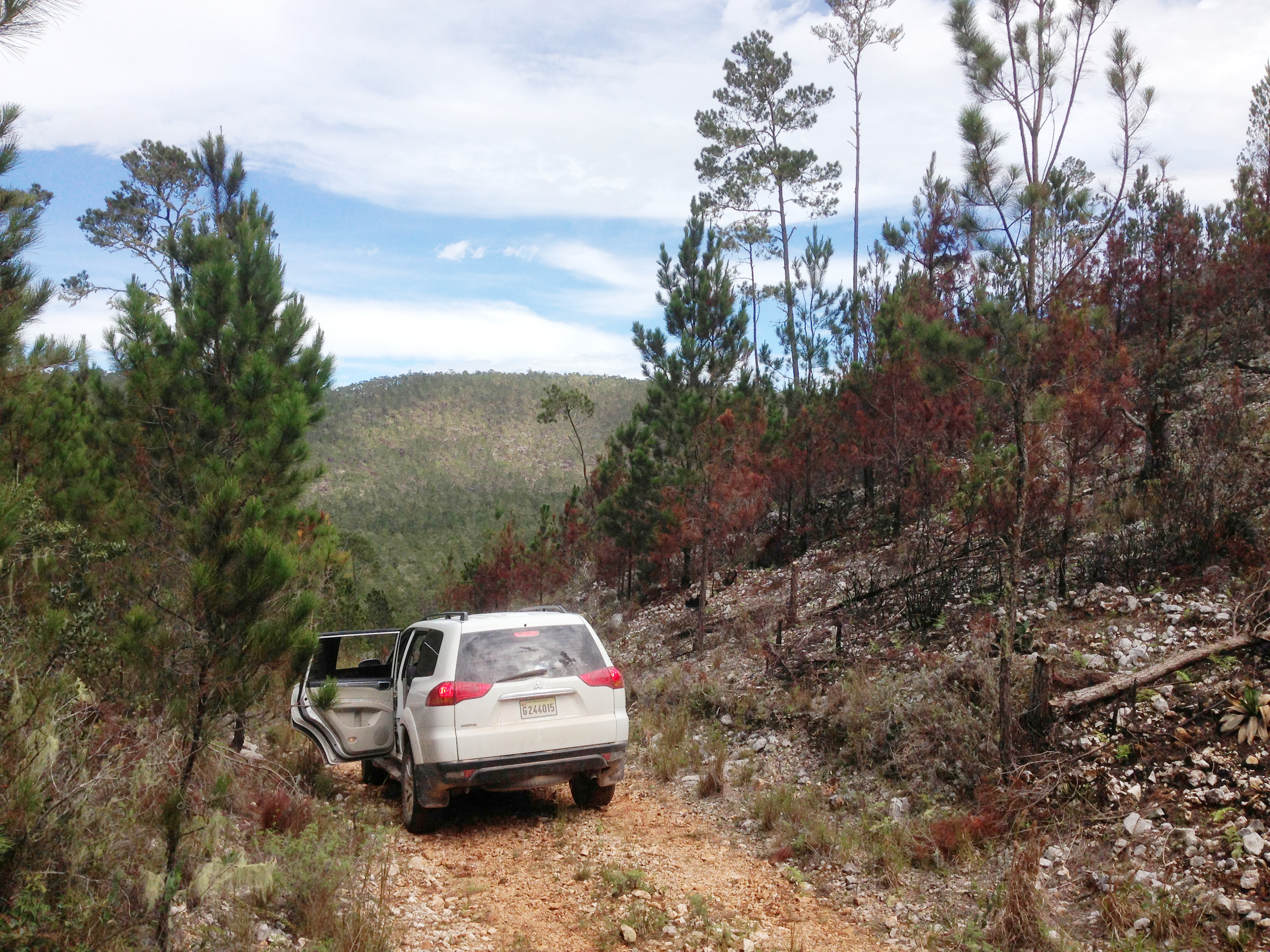
Effects of wildfires visible along the road in Parque Nacional Sierra de Bahoruco.

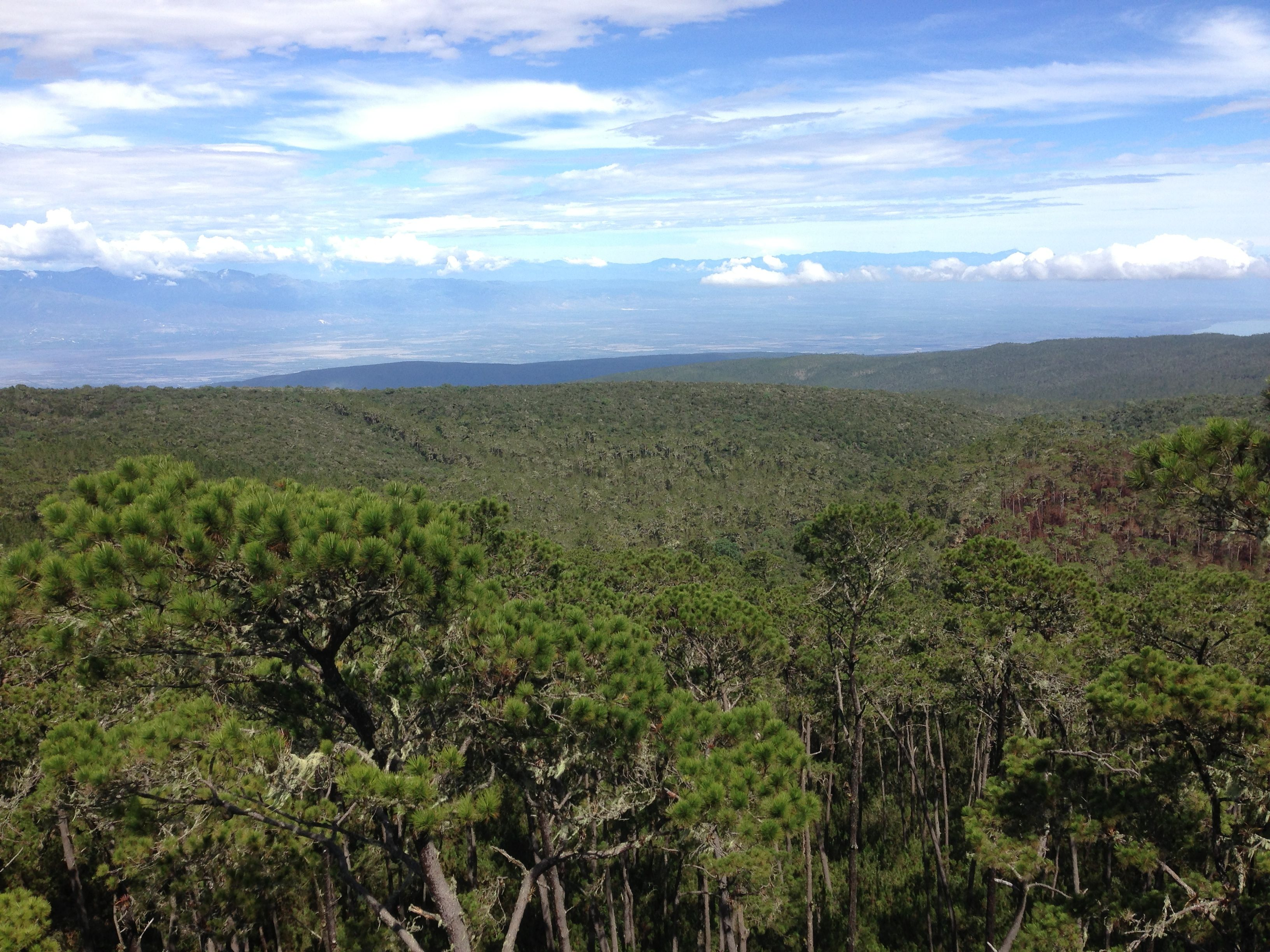
Typical habitat of E. leoncei in Sierra de Bahoruco.
