= Anolis ruizii =

Conservation status
- Endangered (IUCN 3.1)

Scientific classification
- Kingdom: Animalia
- Phylum: Chordata
- Class: Reptilia
- Order: Squamata
- Suborder: Iguania
- Family: Dactyloidae
- Genus: Anolis
- Species: A. ruizii

Binomial name
- Anolis ruizii Rueda & Williams, 1986

Synonyms
- Dactyloa ruizii (Rueda & Williams, 1986)

Species of lizard

Anolis ruizii is a species of lizard in the family Dactyloidae. The species is found in Colombia.
