= Anolis santamartae =

Conservation status
- Data Deficient (IUCN 3.1)

Scientific classification
- Kingdom: Animalia
- Phylum: Chordata
- Class: Reptilia
- Order: Squamata
- Suborder: Iguania
- Family: Dactyloidae
- Genus: Anolis
- Species: A. santamartae

Binomial name
- Anolis santamartae Williams, 1982

Species of lizard

Anolis santamartae, the Santa Marta anole, is a species of lizard in the family Dactyloidae. The species is found in Colombia.
