= Judith Blake (scientist) =

American computational biologist

- Born: Judith Anne Blake
- Education: University of Connecticut (BA); Harvard University (MA, PhD)
- Known for: Gene Ontology; Mouse Genome Informatics
- Awards: ISCB Fellow (2020)
- Scientific career
- Fields: Genome evolution Biomedical ontologies Mouse Genetics
- Workplaces: Jackson Laboratory; University of Connecticut; Tufts University; University of Maine; The Institute for Genomic Research; Smithsonian Institution
- Thesis: Chromosomal variation in the Jamaican lizard, Anolis grahami (1981)
- Doctoral advisor: Ernest Edward Williams
- Website: www.jax.org/research-and-faculty/faculty/judith-blake

Judith Anne Blake is an American computational biologist at the Jackson Laboratory and Professor of Mammalian Genetics.

== Education ==
Blake completed her Bachelor of Arts degree in biology in 1974 at the University of Connecticut. She moved to Harvard University for postgraduate study where she was awarded a Master of Arts degree in 1978 followed by a PhD in 1981. Her PhD investigated chromosomal variation in the Jamaican lizard Anolis grahami and was supervised by Ernest Edward Williams.

== Career and research ==
Blake's research interests are in genome evolution, biomedical ontologies and mouse genetics. She is one of the leaders and founding principal investigators (PIs) of the Gene Ontology (GO) consortium and the Mouse Genome Database (MGD).

=== Awards and honors ===
Blake was elected a Fellow of the International Society for Computational Biology (ISCB) in 2020 for outstanding contributions to computational biology.
