= Anolis reconditus =

Conservation status
- Endangered (IUCN 3.1)

Scientific classification
- Kingdom: Animalia
- Phylum: Chordata
- Class: Reptilia
- Order: Squamata
- Suborder: Iguania
- Family: Dactyloidae
- Genus: Anolis
- Species: A. reconditus

Binomial name
- Anolis reconditus Underwood & Williams, 1959

Species of lizard

Anolis reconditus, the Blue Mountains anole, is a species of lizard in the family Dactyloidae. The species is endemic to Jamaica.
