= Anolis barahonae =

Conservation status
- Endangered (IUCN 3.1)

Scientific classification
- Kingdom: Animalia
- Phylum: Chordata
- Class: Reptilia
- Order: Squamata
- Suborder: Iguania
- Family: Dactyloidae
- Genus: Anolis
- Species: A. barahonae

Binomial name
- Anolis barahonae Williams, 1962

Species of lizard

Anolis barahonae, the Baoruco giant anole or Barahona anole, is a species of lizard in the family Dactyloidae. The species is found in Hispaniola.
