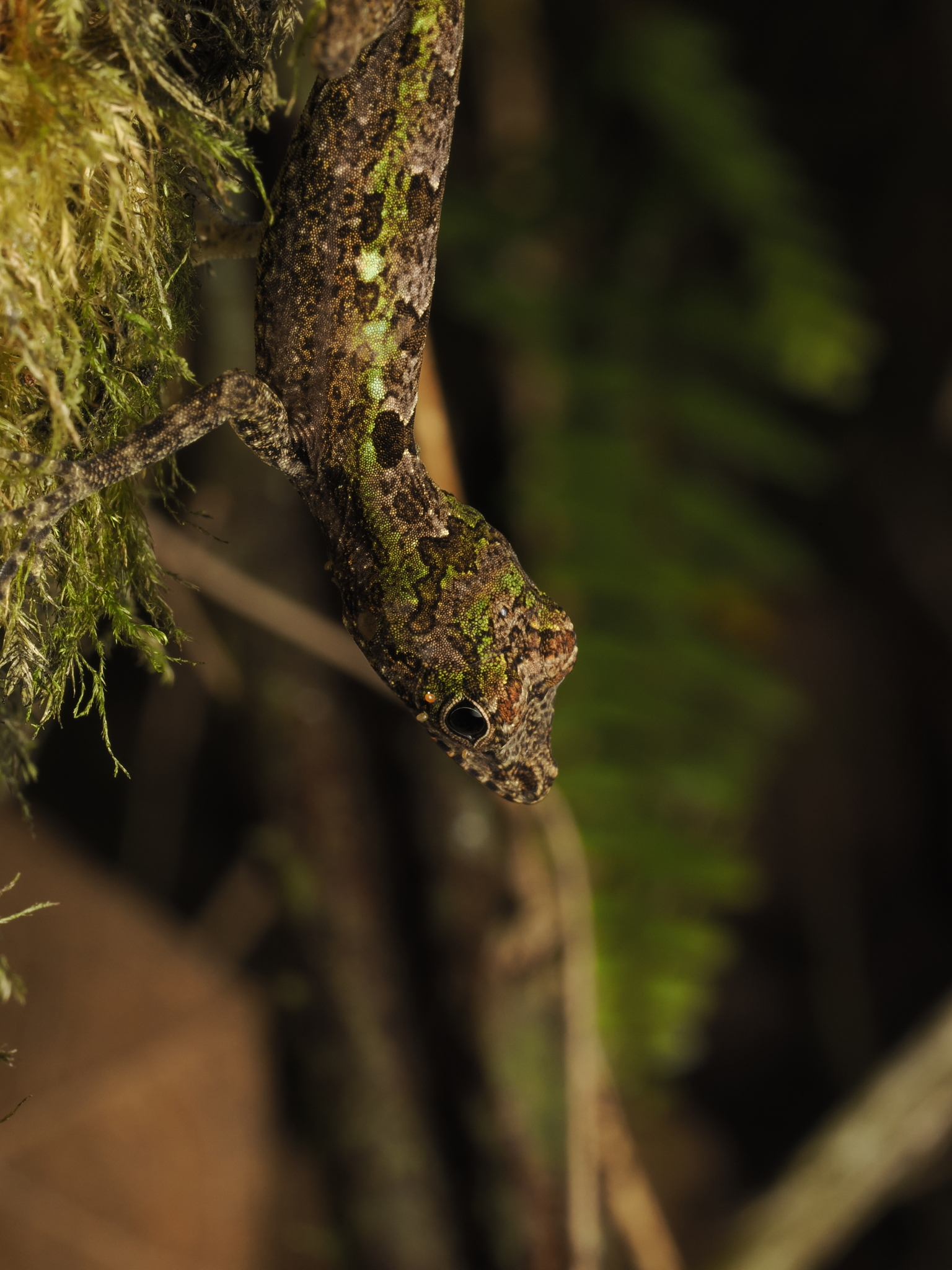

Conservation status
- Near Threatened (IUCN 3.1)

Scientific classification
- Kingdom: Animalia
- Phylum: Chordata
- Class: Reptilia
- Order: Squamata
- Suborder: Iguania
- Family: Dactyloidae
- Genus: Anolis
- Species: A. christophei

Binomial name
- Anolis christophei E. Williams, 1960

= Anolis christophei =

Species of lizard

Anolis christophei, also known commonly as the big-fanned trunk anole and the King Christophe anole, is a species of lizard in the family Dactyloidae. The species is endemic to the island of Hispaniola.

== Etymology ==
The specific name, christophei, refers to the Citadel of King Christophe near Cap-Haïtien, Haiti.

== Geographic range ==
A. christophei is found in the Dominican Republic and Haiti.

== Habitat ==
The preferred natural habitat of A. christophei is forest, at altitudes of 75–1,300 m (246–4,265 ft), but it has also been found in plantations of cacao and coffee.

== Description ==
Small for its genus, adults of A. christophei do not exceed 5 cm (2.0 in) in snout-to-vent length (SVL).

== Reproduction ==
A. christophei is oviparous.
