= Anolis parilis =

Conservation status
- Vulnerable (IUCN 3.1)

Scientific classification
- Kingdom: Animalia
- Phylum: Chordata
- Class: Reptilia
- Order: Squamata
- Suborder: Iguania
- Family: Dactyloidae
- Genus: Anolis
- Species: A. parilis

Binomial name
- Anolis parilis Williams, 1975

Species of lizard

Anolis parilis the Ecuador anole, is a species of lizard in the family Dactyloidae. The species is found in Ecuador.
