= Anolis dissimilis =

Scientific classification
- Kingdom: Animalia
- Phylum: Chordata
- Class: Reptilia
- Order: Squamata
- Suborder: Iguania
- Family: Dactyloidae
- Genus: Anolis
- Species: A. dissimilis

Binomial name
- Anolis dissimilis Williams, 1965

Species of lizard

Anolis dissimilis, the odd anole, is a species of lizard in the family Dactyloidae. The species is found in Peru and Brazil.
