= Anolis calimae =

Conservation status
- Vulnerable (IUCN 3.1)

Scientific classification
- Kingdom: Animalia
- Phylum: Chordata
- Class: Reptilia
- Order: Squamata
- Suborder: Iguania
- Family: Dactyloidae
- Genus: Anolis
- Species: A. calimae

Binomial name
- Anolis calimae Ayala, Harris, & Wiliams, 1983

Species of lizard

Anolis calimae, Ayala's anole, is a species of lizard in the family Dactyloidae. The species is found in Colombia.
