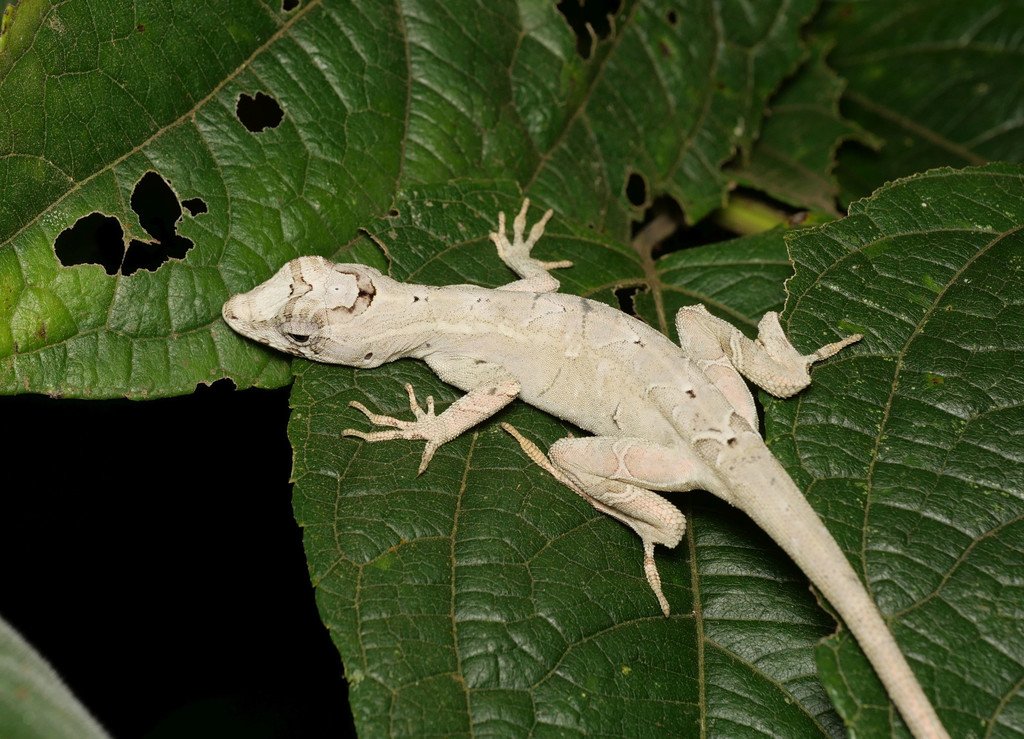

Conservation status
- Least Concern (IUCN 3.1)

Scientific classification
- Kingdom: Animalia
- Phylum: Chordata
- Class: Reptilia
- Order: Squamata
- Suborder: Iguania
- Family: Dactyloidae
- Genus: Anolis
- Species: A. lyra

Binomial name
- Anolis lyra Poe, Velasco, Miyata, & Williams, 2009

= Anolis lyra =

Species of lizard

Anolis lyra is a species of lizard in the family Dactyloidae. The species is found in Colombia and Ecuador.
