= Anolis rupinae =

Scientific classification
- Kingdom: Animalia
- Phylum: Chordata
- Class: Reptilia
- Order: Squamata
- Suborder: Iguania
- Family: Dactyloidae
- Genus: Anolis
- Species: A. rupinae

Binomial name
- Anolis rupinae Williams & Webster, 1974

Species of lizard

Anolis rupinae, Haitian banded red-bellied anole, or Castillon anole, is a species of lizard in the family Dactyloidae. The species is found in Haiti.
