= Handbook of the Mammals of the World =

2009-2019 book series

Handbook of the Mammals of the World (HMW) is a book series from the publisher Lynx Edicions. The nine volumes were published from 2009 to 2019. Each mammal family is assessed in a full text introduction with photographs and each species has a text account with a distribution map and illustrations on a plate. This is the second major project by Lynx Edicions since the release of the Handbook of the Birds of the World in 1992. The chief editors are Russell Mittermeier and Don E. Wilson in association with Conservation International, the Texas A&M University and the IUCN. Don E. Wilson is also editor of the reference work Mammal Species of the World.

An updated two-volume set with taxonomic revisions was released in 2020 as the Illustrated Checklist of the Mammals of the World, and a condensed, single-volume version of the series was published in 2023 as All the Mammals of the World.

== Published volumes ==
=== Volume 1: Carnivores (published in May 2009) ===
With an introduction to the class Mammalia by Don E. Wilson

The first volume is devoted to Carnivora. It covers 13 families and the details to the taxonomy, range, habitat, reproduction, behavior, and conservation status of 245 species. It has more than 400 colour photographs and 257 distribution maps. The 33 colour plates are created by Catalan artist Toni Llobet. This book mentioned the olinguito or Andean olingo for the first time, a species from Ecuador and Colombia, which was officially described in 2013.

Groups covered in this volume are:

- African palm civet (Nandiniidae). One genus and one species.
- Cats (Felidae). 14 genera and 37 species.
- Linsangs (Prionodontidae). One genus and two species.
- Civets, genets and oyans (Viverridae). 14 genera and 34 species.
- Hyenas (Hyaenidae). Four genera and four species.
- Mongooses (Herpestidae). 15 genera and 34 species.
- Euplerids or Madagascar carnivores (Eupleridae). Seven genera and eight species.
- Dogs (Canidae). 13 genera and 35 species.
- Bears (Ursidae). Five genera and eight species.
- Red panda (Ailuridae). One genus and one species.
- Racoons (Procyonidae). Six genera and twelve species.
- Skunks (Mephitidae). Four genera and twelve species.
- Weasels, martens, polecats, badgers and otters (Mustelidae). 22 genera and 57 species.

Other details: Size: 31 × 24 cm. Pages: 728 pp. ISBN 978-84-96553-49-1

=== Volume 2: Hoofed Mammals (published in August 2011) ===
The second volume is devoted to the ungulates (hoofed mammals). It covers 107 genera, 17 families in six orders and the details to the taxonomy, range, habitat, reproduction, behaviour, and conservation status of 413 species. It has 664 colour photographs and 433 distribution maps. The 56 colour plates are created by Catalan artist Toni Llobet.

Groups covered in this volume are:

- Aardvark (Orycteropodidae). One genus and one species.
- Hyrax (Procaviidae). Three genera and five species.
- Elephants (Elephantidae). Two genera and three species.
- Pangolins (Manidae). One genus and eight species.
- Horses, wild ass, and zebras (Equidae). One genus and seven species.
- Rhinoceros (Rhinocerotidae). Four genera and five species.
- Tapir (Tapiridae). One genus and four species.
- Camelids (Camelidae). Three genera and six species.
- Pigs, babirusa, and warthog (Suidae). Six genera and 17 species.
- Peccaries (Tayassuidae). Three genera and three species.
- Hippopotamus (Hippopotamidae). Two genera and two species.
- Chevrotains (Tragulidae). Three genera and ten species.
- Musk deers (Moschidae). One genus and seven species.
- Deers (Cervidae). 18 genera and 53 species.
- Bovids (Bovidae) 54 genera and 279 species.
- Pronghorn (Antilocapridae). One genus and one species.
- Giraffe and okapi (Giraffidae). Two genera and two species.

Other details: Size: 31 × 24 cm. Pages: 886 pp. ISBN 978-84-96553-77-4

=== Volume 3: Primates (published in April 2013) ===
The third volume is devoted to the primates. It covers 17 families and the details to the taxonomy, range, habitat, reproduction, behaviour, and conservation status of 480 species. The 57 colour plates are created by English wildlife artist Stephen D. Nash. Edited by Russell A. Mittermeier, Anthony B. Rylands, Don E. Wilson.

Groups covered in this volume are:

- Mouse, giant mouse, dwarf, and fork marked lemurs (Cheirogaleidae). Five genera and 31 species.
- Sportive lemur (Lepilemuridae). One genus and 26 species.
- Bamboo, true, and ruffed lemurs (Lemuridae). Five genera and 21 species.
- Woolly lemurs, sifakas, and the indri (Indriidae). Three genera and 19 species.
- Aye-aye (as only surviving member) (Daubentoniidae). One genus and one species.
- Galago (Galagidae). Five genera and 18 species.
- Angwantibos, pottos, and Lorises (Lorisidae). Four genera and 12 species.
- Tarsier (Tarsiidae). Three genera and 11 species.
- Marmosets and tamarins (Callitrichidae). Seven genera and 47 species.
- Squirrel monkeys and capuchins (Cebidae). Three genera and 29 species.
- Night monkey (Aotidae). One genus and 11 species.
- Titis, sakis and uakaris (Pitheciidae). Four genera and 44 species.
- Howlers, spider and woolly monkeys and muriquis (Atelidae). Five genera and 25 species.
- Old World monkeys (Cercopithecidae). 23 genera and 159 species.
- Gibbons (Hylobatidae). Four genera and 19 species.
- Great apes (Hominidae). Four genera and seven species (including humans).

Other details: Size: 31 × 24 cm. Pages: 951 pp. ISBN 978-84-96553-89-7

=== Volume 4: Sea Mammals (published in July 2014) ===
The fourth volume is devoted to marine mammals, which include the largest mammals on earth, the whales, as well as dolphins, ear seals, walrus, earless seals, dugongs, and manatees. It covers 19 families and the details to the taxonomy, range, habitat, reproduction, behavior, and conservation status of 128 species. The 30 colour plates are created by Toni Llobet.

Groups covered in this volume are:

- Otariidae (eared seals). Seven genera and 15 species.
- Odobenidae (walrus). One genus and one species.
- Phocidae (earless seals). 13 genera and 18 species.
- Balaenidae (right whales). Two genera and four species.
- Neobalaenidae (pygmy right whale). One genus and one species.
- Eschrichtiidae (gray whale). One genus and one species.
- Balaenopteridae (rorquals). Two genera and eight species.
- Physeteridae (sperm whale). One genus and one species.
- Kogiidae (pygmy and dwarf sperm whales). One genus and two species.
- Ziphiidae (beaked whales). Six genera and 22 species.
- Platanistidae (South Asian river dolphin). One genus and one species.
- Iniidae (Amazon river dolphins). One genus and three species.
- Lipotidae (baiji). One genus and one species.
- Pontoporiidae (Franciscana). One genus and one species.
- Monodontidae (beluga and narwhal). Two genera and two species.
- Delphinidae (ocean dolphins). 17 genera and 36 species.
- Phocoenidae (porpoises). Three genera and seven species.
- Trichechidae (manatees). One genus and three species.
- Dugongidae (dugong). One genus and one species.

Other details: Size: 31 × 24 cm. Pages: 614 pp. ISBN 978-84-96553-93-4

=== Volume 5: Marsupials (published in June 2015) ===
The fifth volume is devoted to the marsupials, echidnas, platypus, and opossums. The 44 colour plates are created by Toni Llobet. It covers the details to the taxonomy, range, habitat, reproduction, behaviour, and conservation status of 354 species from 21 families in eight orders. The introductory chapter by Kristofer Helgen is about recently extinct marsupials like the thylacine.

Groups covered in this volume are:

- Tachyglossidae (echidnas). Two genera and four species.
- Ornithorhynchidae (platypus). One genus and one species.
- Didelphidae (opossums). 18 genera and 103 species.
- Caenolestidae (shrew opossums). Three genera and seven species.
- Microbiotheriidae (monito del monte). One genus and one species.
- Notoryctidae (marsupial moles). One genus and two species.
- Myrmecobiidae (numbat). One genus and one species.
- Dasyuridae (carnivorous marsupials). 17 genera and 74 species.
- Thylacomyidae (bilby). One genus and one species.
- Peramelidae (bandicoots). Six genera and 18 species.
- Phascolarctidae (koala). One genus and one species.
- Vombatidae (wombats). Two genera and three species.
- Burramyidae (pygmy possums). Two genera and five species.
- Phalangeridae (cuscuses, brushtail possums and relatives). Six genera and 29 species.
- Pseudocheiridae (ring-tailed possums and greater gliders). Six genera and 20 species.
- Petauridae (striped possums, Leadbeater's possum and lesser gliders). Three genera and twelve species.
- Tarsipedidae (honey possum). One genus and one species.
- Acrobatidae (feathertail gliders and possums). Two genera and three species.
- Hypsiprymnodontidae (rat kangaroos). One genus and one species.
- Potoroidae (bettongs and potoroos). Three genera and eight species.
- Macropodidae (kangaroos and wallabies). 13 genera and 59 species.

Other details: Size: 31 × 24 cm. Pages: 800 pp. ISBN 978-84-96553-99-6

=== Volume 6: Lagomorphs and Rodents I (published in July 2016) ===
Initially it was intended to publish only one volume on lagomorphs and rodents. But due to the large number of described rodents Lynx Edicions organized a survey from summer to autumn 2015 in which a majority of customers decided in favor of two volumes. The sixth volume is devoted to the lagomorphs and 25 families of rodents, including the hares, pikas, chinchillas, the Laotian rock rat (a living fossil), the capybara (the largest extant rodent), and the diverse group of squirrels. The 60 colour plates are created by Toni Llobet. It covers the details to the taxonomy, range, habitat, reproduction, behaviour, and conservation status of 823 species from 27 families in two orders. It includes a special chapter on the overview of rodents, on morphology, taxonomy, and evolutionary history; why rodents are studied; and tools for studying them. Edited by Don E. Wilson, Thomas E. Lacher Jr, and Russell A. Mittermeier.

Groups covered in this volume are:

- Ochotonidae (pikas). One genus and 29 species.
- Leporidae (hares and rabbits). Eleven genera and 63 species.
- Castoridae (beavers). One genus and two species.
- Heteromyidae (kangaroo rats, kangaroo mice, and pocket mice). Five genera and 66 species.
- Geomyidae (pocket gophers). Seven genera and 41 species.
- Anomaluridae (anomalures). Three genera and seven species.
- Pedetidae (springhares). One genus and two species.
- Ctenodactylidae (gundis). Four genera and five species.
- Diatomyidae (Laotian rock rat or kha-nyou) One genus and one species.
- Hystricidae (Old World porcupines). Three genera and eleven species.
- Thryonomyidae (cane rats). One genus and two species.
- Petromuridae (dassie rat or noki). One genus and one species.
- Heterocephalidae (naked mole-rat). One genus and one species.
- Bathyergidae (African mole-rats). Five genera and 17 species.
- Erethizontidae (New World porcupines). Three genera and 17 species.
- Cuniculidae (pacas). One genus and two species.
- Caviidae (cavies, capybaras, and maras). Six genera and 20 species.
- Dasyproctidae (agoutis and acouchis). Two genera and 15 species.
- Chinchillidae (chinchillas and viscachas). Three genera and six species.
- Dinomyidae (pacarana). One genus and one species.
- Abrocomidae (chinchilla rats and Inka rats). Two genera and ten species.
- Ctenomyidae (tuco-tucos). One genus and 69 species.
- Octodontidae (viscacha rats, degus, rock rats and coruro). Eight genera and 14 species.
- Echimyidae (hutias, coypu, spiny-rats). 27 genera and 99 species.
- Aplodontiidae (mountain beaver). One genus and one species.
- Sciuridae (tree squirrels, chipmunks, marmots, flying squirrels, and ground squirrels). 60 genera and 292 species.
- Gliridae (dormice). Nine genera and 29 species.

Other details: Size: 31 × 24 cm. Pages: 988 pp. ISBN 978-84-941892-3-4

=== Volume 7: Rodents II (published in December 2017) ===
The seventh volume is devoted to the nine families of mouse-like rodents (Myomorpha), including the true mice, rats, birch mice, tree mice, jerboas, hamsters, and voles. In contrast to other systematics (e.g. Wilson/Reeder: Mammal Species of the World, 2005) the family Dipodidae was split into Dipodidae, Zapodidae and Sminthidae, a new name proposed for the former subfamily Sicistinae. The 58 colour plates are created by Toni Llobet. It covers the details to the taxonomy, range, habitat, reproduction, behaviour, and conservation status of 1,744 species from 345 genera and 9 families in one suborder. It includes a special chapter entitled Priorities for Conserving the World’s Rodents. Edited by Don E. Wilson, Thomas E. Lacher Jr, and Russell A. Mittermeier.

Groups covered in this volume are:

- Sminthidae (or Sicistinae in other systematics) (birch mice). 1 genus and 14 species.
- Zapodidae (or Zapodinae in other systematics) (jumping mice). 3 genera and 5 species.
- Dipodidae (jerboas). 13 genera and 35 species.
- Platacanthomyidae (tree mice). 2 genera and 5 species.
- Spalacidae (muroid mole-rats). 7 genera and 28 species.
- Calomyscidae (brush-tailed mice). 1 genus and 8 Species.
- Nesomyidae (pouched rats, climbing mice and fat mice). 21 genera and 68 species.
- Cricetidae (true hamsters, voles, lemmings and New World rats and mice). 142 genera and 765 species.
- Muridae (true mice and rats (Old World rats and mice), gerbils and relatives). 155 genera and 816 species.

Other details: Size: 31 × 24 cm. Pages: 1008. ISBN 978-84-16728-04-6

=== Volume 8: Insectivores, Sloths and Colugos (published in July 2018) ===
The eighth volume is devoted to the orders Cingulata, Pilosa, Afrosoricida, Macroscelidea, Scandentia, Dermoptera, and Eulipotyphla. The 28 color plates are created by Toni Llobet. There is a special chapter titled Conservation Priorities and Actions for the Orders Cingulata, Pilosa, Afrosoricida, Macroscelidea, Eulipotyphla, Dermoptera, and Scandentia by Rosalind Kennerley, Thomas Lacher, Jr., Victor Mason, Shelby McCay, Nicolette Roach, P. J. Stephenson, Mariella Superina and Richard Young. The most species covered in this volume have various insectivorous diets with the exception of the colugos and sloths that are either frugivorous or folivorous.

Groups covered in this volume are:

- Dasypodidae (long-nosed armadillos). One genus and seven species.
- Chlamyphoridae (chlamyphorid armadillos). Eight genera and 13 species.
- Myrmecophagidae (American anteaters). Two genera and three species.
- Cyclopedidae (silky anteater). One genus and seven species.
- Megalonychidae (two-toed sloths). One genus and two species.
- Bradypodidae (three-toed sloths). One genus and four species.
- Tenrecidae (tenrecs). Eight genera and 31 species.
- Potamogalidae (otter shrews). Two genera and three species.
- Chrysochloridae (golden moles). Ten genera and 21 species.
- Macroscelididae (elephant shrews). Five genera and 20 species.
- Ptilocercidae (pen-tailed tree shrew). One genus and one species.
- Tupaiidae (common tree shrews). Three genera and 22 species.
- Cynocephalidae (colugos). Two genera and two species.
- Erinaceidae (hedgehogs). Ten genera and 26 species.
- Soricidae (shrews). 25 genera and 448 species.
- Talpidae (moles). 18 genera and 54 species.
- Solenodontidae (solenodons). Two genera and two species.

Other details: Size: 31 × 24 cm. Pages: 710. ISBN 978-84-16728-08-4

=== Volume 9: Bats (published in October 2019) ===
The ninth volume is devoted to the bats. It covers the details to the taxonomy, range, habitat, reproduction, behaviour, and conservation status of 1401 species from 21 families in the order Chiroptera. Unlike previous volumes, where all the illustrations were created by a single person in each one, the 73 plates of this volume contain illustrations from six artists, namely Ilian Velikov, Blanca Martí de Ahumada, Alex Mascarell Llosa, Faansie Peacock, Jesús Rodríguez-Osorio Martín and Lluís Sogorb.

Groups covered in this volume are:

- Old World fruit bats (Pteropodidae) 46 genera and 191 species.
- Mouse-tailed bats (Rhinopomatidae) One genus and six species.
- Hog-nosed bat (Craseonycteridae) One genus and one species.
- False-vampire bats (Megadermatidae) Six genera and six species.
- Trident bats (Rhinonycteridae) Four genera and nine species.
- Old World leaf-nosed bats (Hipposideridae) Seven genera and 88 species.
- Horseshoe bats (Rhinolophidae) One genus and 109 species.
- Sheath-tailed bats (Emballonuridae) Fourteen genera and 54 species.
- Slit-faced bats (Nycteridae) One genus and 15 species.
- Madagascar sucker-footed bats (Myzopodidae) One genus and two species.
- New Zealand short-tailed bats (Mystacinidae) One genus and two species.
- Bulldog bats (Noctilionidae) One genus and two species.
- Smoky bat and thumbless bat (Furipteridae) Two genera and two species.
- Disk-winged bats (Thyropteridae) One genus and five species.
- Ghost-faced bats, naked-backed bats and mustached bats (Mormoopidae) Two genera and 18 species.
- New World leaf-nosed bats (Phyllostomidae) Sixty genera and 217 species.
- Funnel-eared bats (Natalidae) Three genera and 12 species.
- Free-tailed bats (Molossidae) 22 genera and 126 species.
- Long-fingered bats (Miniopteridae) One genus and 38 species.
- Wing-gland bats (Cistugidae) One genus and two species.
- Vesper bats (Vespertilionidae) 54 genera and 496 species.

Other details: Size: 31 × 24 cm. Pages: 1008. ISBN 978-84-16728-19-0

== Opinions ==
The handbook has had a mixed reception. In particular, the taxonomic system that has been used for the prominent family Bovidae (Volume 2) is not generally accepted. Heller et al. have argued that the revised bovid species list, which doubled the amount of recognized bovid species, is based only on one primary source. This increase was mainly due to an expanded species concept (PSC concept), not on newly available data sets. For example, the handbook distinguishes 11 species of klipspringer, but the morphological variations within each of these proposed species are often greater than between them. In addition, the taxonomy is criticised as inconsistent, since many taxa, such as the different giraffe forms, are treated as subspecies of a single species, despite the fact that some are clearly distinguishable. Heller et al. warn that taxonomic inflation of species could impede conservation efforts.

== Illustrated Checklist of the Mammals of the World Volume 1 and 2 ==
This illustrated checklist incorporates all the species from Handbook of the Mammals of the World (HMW), along with updates in taxonomy, conservation status and distribution maps when needed. Each species account is shorter, with the accounts including common names in English, French, German, and Spanish, the IUCN Red List Conservation Category, Taxonomic notes, and a list of recognised subspecies, in a very similar format to HBW and BirdLife International Illustrated Checklist of the Birds of the World. Split into two volumes, these books contain all known mammal species, split into 27 orders, 167 families, 1,343 genera, 6,554 species, with 104 being extinct and 19 domesticated. They also feature more than 7,250 illustrations, including 800 new ones of primates and more than 100 of other groups. It was published in September 2020.

=== Volume 1 ===
- Monotremata (Platypus and echidnas)
- Marsupialia (Kangaroos, koalas, opossums, wombats, and Tasmanian devils)
- Xenarthra (Anteaters, tree sloths, and armadillos)
- Afrotheria (Elephant shrews, tenrecs, aardvarks, elephants and sea cows)
- Euarchonta (Treeshrews, colugos, and primates)
- Glires (Rabbits, hares and rodents)

=== Volumes 2 ===
- Eulipotyphla (Hedgehogs, moles and shrews)
- Chiroptera (Bats)
- Cetartiodactyla (Ungulates like goats, deer and giraffes, along with whales, dolphins, and porpoises)
- Perissodactyla (Horses, rhinoceroses and tapirs)
- Pholidota (Pangolins)
- Carnivora (Cats, dogs, bears and seals)

== All the Mammals of the World ==
A condensed, single-volume edition of the Handbook series was published in 2023, containing color illustrations, distribution maps, length and mass measurements, IUCN Red List category, and common names for 6581 species, but without the longer text descriptions of the species.
