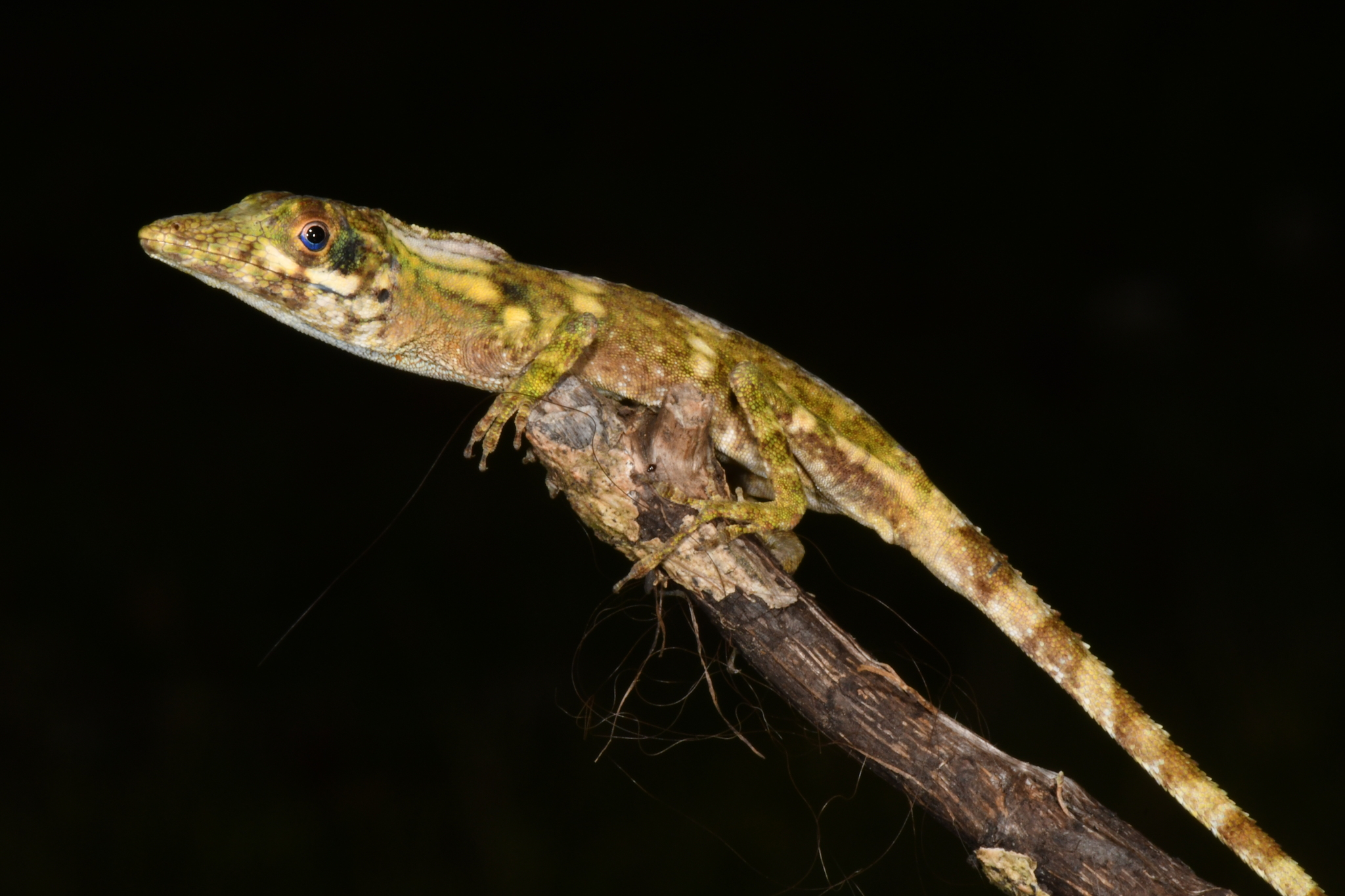

Conservation status
- Endangered (IUCN 3.1)

Scientific classification
- Kingdom: Animalia
- Phylum: Chordata
- Class: Reptilia
- Order: Squamata
- Suborder: Iguania
- Family: Dactyloidae
- Genus: Anolis
- Species: A. insolitus

Binomial name
- Anolis insolitus Williams & Rand, 1969

= Anolis insolitus =

Species of lizard

Anolis insolitus, the Cordillera central twig anole or La Palma anole, is a species of lizard in the family Dactyloidae. The species is found in the Dominican Republic.
