= Stephen D. Nash =

English wildlife artist

Stephen David Nash (born 1954) is an English wildlife artist who primarily specialises on primates. He is currently based at the Stony Brook University on Long Island, New York, USA, in the Department of Anatomical Sciences where he works as a visiting research associate.

== Career ==
Nash spent his school days in Clacton-on-Sea. He attended Holland Park County Primary School and Colbayn's High School. Subsequently, he studied at the Colchester School of Art, the Middlesex University, and the Royal College of Art where he received his Bachelor of Arts degree in graphic design (scientific illustration) in 1979 and his Master of Arts degree in natural history illustration in July 1982. (Note: Zoos' Print Journal Magazine Volume 20 (July 2005): Scientific illustrations of South Asia's 45 species and subspecies of primates p 26) Nash initially planned a profession as medical illustrator, but changed his career path after seeing Callitrichid monkeys at London Zoo. Since 1982 he has worked for Russell Mittermeier, chairman of the IUCN/SSC Primate Specialist Group and president of Conservation International, and for Anthony Rylands, deputy chairman of the IUCN/SSC Primate Specialist Group. After the founding of Conservation International in 1987, Nash became its scientific illustrator in 1989. In 1990 he married Luci Betti, who is also an illustrator. Nash provided illustrations for numerous books, scientific articles, and conservation education materials, including Monkeyshines on the Primates: A Study of Primatology (1994), Lemurs of Madagascar (1994), Primates of West Africa: Pocket Identification Guide (2010) and the primates volume of the Handbook of the Mammals of the World (2013).

In 2002 Marc van Roosmalen and Russell Mittermeier commemorated Nash with the name of the titi monkey Callicebus stephennashi. (Note: Marc G. M. van Roosmalen, Tomas van Roosmalen und Russell A. Mittermeier: A Taxonomic Review of the Titi Monkeys, Genus „Callicebus“ Thomas 1903, with the Description of two New Species: „Callicebus bernhardi“ and „Callicebus stepehnnashi“, from Brazilian Amazonia. In: Neotropical Primates. 10, ISSN 1413-4705, 2002, p 1–52.) In 2004, the American Society of Primatologists honoured him with its President's Award (Note: ASP President's Award Winners) and in 2008 he received the PSGB Occasional Medal of the Primate Society of Great Britain. (Note: The Primate Society Medals)

== Publications (selected) ==
- Birds in the Tanjung Puting National Park, Kalimantan Tengah Province, 1986
- The Birds of Java and Bali, 1989
- The Birds of Sumatra and Kalimantan, 1991
- Sold for a song: the trade in Southeast Asian non-CITES birds, 1993
- Monkeyshines on the Primates: A Study of Primatology, 1994
- Lemurs of Madagascar, 1994
- From Steppe to Store, 1995
- Primate Adaption and Evolution, 1999
- North American Regional Studbook for White-cheeked Gibbon Nomascus Leucogenys and Golden-cheeked Gibbon Nomascus Gabriellae, 2000
- Primates of Colombia, 2005
- Libro rojo de los mamíferos de Colombia, 2006
- Primates of West Africa: Pocket Identification Guide. 2010
- Handbook of the Mammals of the World Vol 3 Primates, 2013
