= Anolis euskalerriari =

Scientific classification
- Kingdom: Animalia
- Phylum: Chordata
- Class: Reptilia
- Order: Squamata
- Suborder: Iguania
- Family: Anolidae
- Genus: Anolis
- Species: A. euskalerriari

Binomial name
- Anolis euskalerriari (Barros, Williams, & Viloria, 1996)

Species of lizard

Anolis euskalerriari is a species of lizard in the family Dactyloidae. The species is found in Venezuela.
