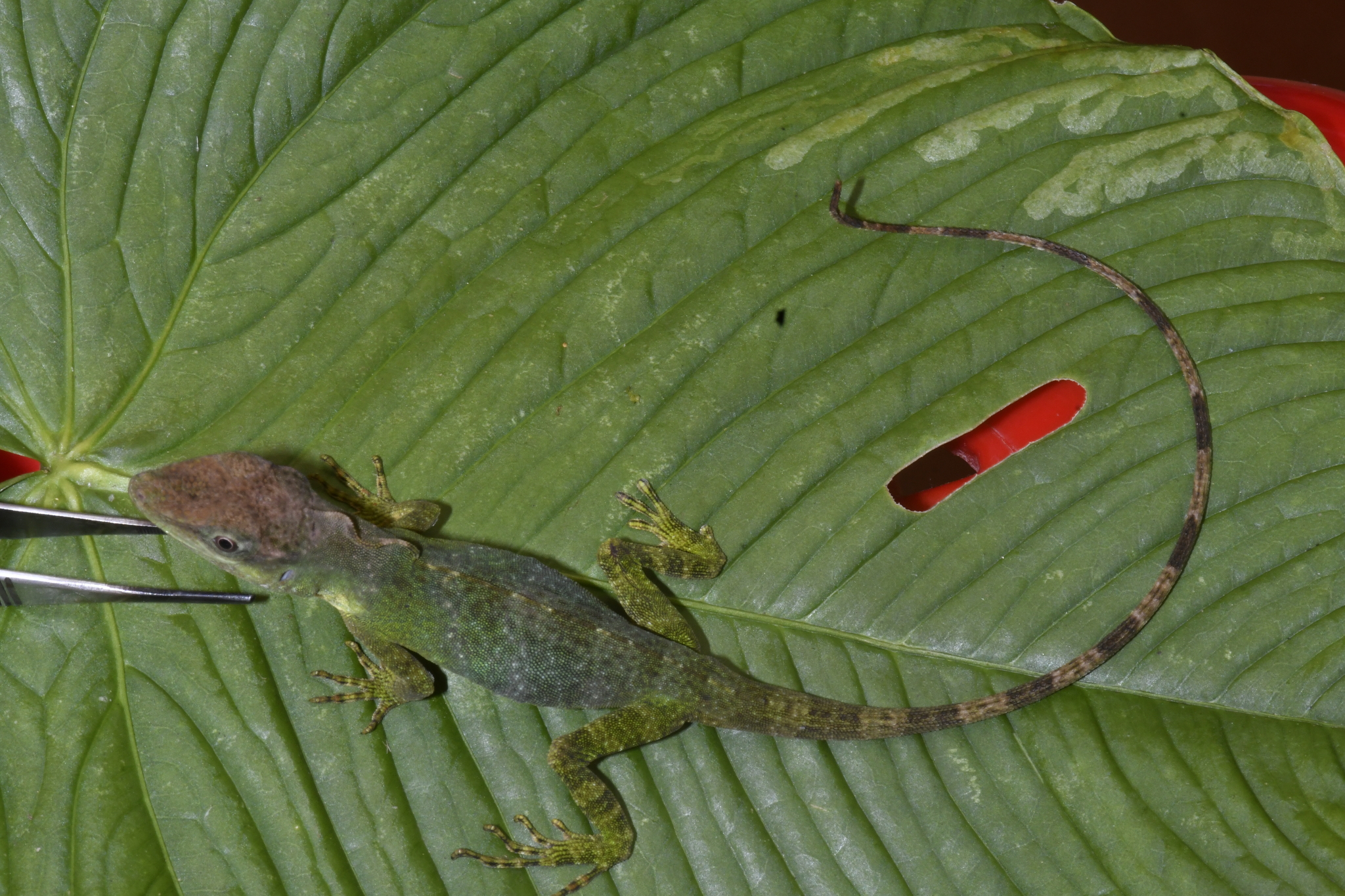

Scientific classification
- Kingdom: Animalia
- Phylum: Chordata
- Class: Reptilia
- Order: Squamata
- Suborder: Iguania
- Family: Dactyloidae
- Genus: Anolis
- Species: A. mirus

Binomial name
- Anolis mirus Williams, 1963

= Anolis mirus =

Species of lizard

Anolis mirus is a species of lizard in the family Dactyloidae. The species is found in Colombia.
