= Anolis singularis =

Scientific classification
- Kingdom: Animalia
- Phylum: Chordata
- Class: Reptilia
- Order: Squamata
- Suborder: Iguania
- Family: Dactyloidae
- Genus: Anolis
- Species: A. singularis

Binomial name
- Anolis singularis Williams, 1965

Species of lizard

Anolis singularis, the Macaya green twig anole or porcupine anole, is a species of lizard in the family Dactyloidae. The species is found in Haiti and the Dominican Republic.
