= Ernest Edward Williams =

American herpetologist

Ernest Williams
- Born: Ernest Edward Williams; January 7, 1914; Easton, Pennsylvania, United States
- Died: September 1, 1998 (aged 84); Pennsylvania, United States
- Education: Columbia University
- Scientific career
- Fields: Systematics, Herpetology
- Workplaces: Harvard University
- Thesis: Variation and selection in the cervical central articulations of living turtles (1950)
- Doctoral advisor: William King Gregory
- Doctoral students: Robert Trivers; Judith Blake

Ernest Edward Williams (January 7, 1914 – September 1, 1998) was an American herpetologist. He coined the term ecomorph based on his research on anoles.

== Taxa named in honor of Ernest E. Williams ==
The following species are named in honor of Ernest E. Williams.

- Lygodactylus williamsi Loveridge, 1952
- Anolis eewi Roze, 1958 (synonym of Anolis planiceps)
- Erythrolamprus williamsi (Roze, 1958)
- Strophurus williamsi (Kluge, 1963)
- Pelusios williamsi Laurent, 1965
- Dipsas williamsi (Carillo de Espinoza, 1974)
- Anolis ernestwilliamsi Lazell, 1983
- Phrynops williamsi Rhodin & Mittermeier, 1983
- Sphaerodactylus williamsi Thomas & Schwartz, 1983
- Lepidoblepharis williamsi Ayala & Serna, 1986
- Cynisca williamsi Gans, 1987
- Pristimantis ernesti Flores, 1987
- Anolis williamsmittermeierorum Poe & Yañez-Miranda, 2007

== Taxa described by Ernest E. Williams ==
- Aldabrachelys Loveridge & Williams, 1957
- Anolis anchicayae Poe, Velasco, Miyata & Williams, 2009
- Anolis annectens Williams, 1974
- Anolis antioquiae Williams, 1985
- Anolis barahonae Williams, 1962
- Anolis biporcatus parvauritus Williams, 1966
- Anolis brasiliensis Vanzolini & Williams, 1970
- Anolis calimae Ayala, Harris & Williams, 1983
- Anolis caquetae Williams, 1974
- Anolis carlostoddi Williams, Praderio & Gorzula, 1996
- Anolis chocorum Williams & Duellman, 1967
- Anolis christophei Williams, 1960
- Anolis danieli Williams, 1988
- Anolis deltae Williams, 1974
- Anolis dissimilis Williams, 1965
- Anolis dolichocephalus Williams, 1963
- Anolis etheridgei Williams, 1962
- Anolis euskalerriari Barros, Williams & Viloria, 1996
- Anolis fitchi Williams & Duellman, 1984
- Anolis grahami aquarum Underwood & Williams, 1959
- Anolis huilae Williams, 1982
- Anolis ibague Williams, 1975
- Anolis imias Ruibal & Williams, 1961
- Anolis insolitus Williams & Rand, 1969
- Anolis kunayalae Hulebak, Poe, Ibáñez & Williams, 2007
- Anolis lamari Williams, 1992
- Anolis lineatopus ahenobarbus Underwood & Williams, 1959
- Anolis lineatopus merope Underwood & Williams, 1959
- Anolis lyra Poe, Velasco, Miyata & Williams, 2009
- Anolis maculigula Williams, 1984
- Anolis marcanoi Williams, 1975
- Anolis medemi Ayala & Williams, 1988
- Anolis menta Ayala, Harris & Williams, 1984
- Anolis mirus Williams, 1963
- Anolis neblininus Myers, Williams & McDiarmid, 1993
- Anolis nigrolineatus Williams, 1965
- Anolis occultus Williams & Rivero, 1965
- Anolis parilis Williams, 1975
- Anolis propinquus Williams, 1984
- Anolis reconditus Underwood & Williams, 1959
- Anolis ricordi leberi Williams, 1965
- Anolis rivalis Williams, 1984
- Anolis ruizi Rueda & Williams, 1986
- Anolis rupinae Williams & Webster, 1974
- Anolis santamartae Williams, 1982
- Anolis singularis Williams, 1965
- Anolis tetarii Barros, Williams & Viloria, 1996
- Anolis vanzolinii Williams, Orcés, Matheus & Bleiweiss, 1996
- Anolis vaupesianus Williams, 1982
- Anolis vicarius Williams, 1986
- Anolis whitemani Williams, 1963
- Cnemidophorus vanzoi Baskin & Williams, 1966
- Eleutherodactylus furcyensis Shreve & Williams, 1963
- Eleutherodactylus heminota Shreve & Williams, 1963
- Eleutherodactylus leoncei Shreve & Williams, 1963
- Puertoricomys corozalus Williams & Koopman, 1951
- Urostrophus gallardoi Etheridge & Williams, 1991

== Bibliography ==
- Gans C (2000). "Obituaries: Ernest Edward Williams 1914-1998". Herpetological Review 31 (1): 10-11.
- Losos J, Crompton A, Liem KF (October 1, 2009). "Ernest Edward Williams". Retrieved from HARVARDgazette ().
- Rhodin AGJ, Miyata K (1983). Advances in Herpetology and Evolutionary Biology : Essays in Honor of Ernest E. Williams. ().
