= Anolis vanzolinii =

Conservation status
- Critically Endangered (IUCN 3.1)

Scientific classification
- Kingdom: Animalia
- Phylum: Chordata
- Class: Reptilia
- Order: Squamata
- Suborder: Iguania
- Family: Dactyloidae
- Genus: Anolis
- Species: A. vanzolinii

Binomial name
- Anolis vanzolinii E. Williams, Orcés, Matheus, & Bleiweiss, 1996

Synonyms
- Phenacosaurus vanzolinii E. Williams et al., 1996; Anolis vanzolinii — Poe, 1998; Dactyloa vanzolinii — Nicholson et al., 2012

Species of lizard

Anolis vanzolinii is a species of lizard in the family Dactyloidae (anoles). The species is endemic to Ecuador.

== Etymology ==
The specific name, vanzolinii, is in honor of Brazilian herpetologist (and samba composer) Paulo Vanzolini.

== Geographic range ==
A. vanzolinii is found in Sucumbíos Province, Ecuador.

== Habitat ==
The preferred natural habitat of A. vanzolinii is forest, at altitudes of 1,950–2,630 m (6,400–8,630 ft).

== Reproduction ==
A. vanzolinii is oviparous.
