= Anolis williamsmittermeierorum =

Conservation status
- Data Deficient (IUCN 3.1)

Scientific classification
- Kingdom: Animalia
- Phylum: Chordata
- Class: Reptilia
- Order: Squamata
- Suborder: Iguania
- Family: Dactyloidae
- Genus: Anolis
- Species: A. williamsmittermeierorum

Binomial name
- Anolis williamsmittermeierorum Poe & Yañez-Miranda, 2007

Species of lizard

Anolis williamsmittermeierorum, Williams-Mittermeier anole, is a species of lizard in the family Dactyloidae. The species is found in Ecuador and Peru.
