= Southeast Peninsula, Sulawesi =

Peninsula in Indonesia

Southeast Peninsula
- Location within Sulawesi

Geography
- Location: Southeast Asia
- Coordinates: 4°S 122°E
- Adjacent to: Banda Sea; Gulf of Tolo; Gulf of Boni

Administration
- Indonesia
- Province: Southeast Sulawesi; South Sulawesi; Central Sulawesi
- Largest settlement: Kendari

The Southeast Peninsula is a peninsula of Sulawesi (Celebes), lying between the Gulf of Tolo and the Gulf of Boni. It is mostly coterminous with the province of Southeast Sulawesi. The largest city on the peninsula is Kendari.

Several islands are situated off its south-eastern tip, including Muna and Buton.

== See also ==
- East, South, and Minahassa Peninsulas
