= Circles of latitude between the Equator and the 5th parallel south =

Circles of latitude

Following are circles of latitude between the Equator and the 5th parallel south:

== 1st parallel south ==
1st parallel south (interactive map)

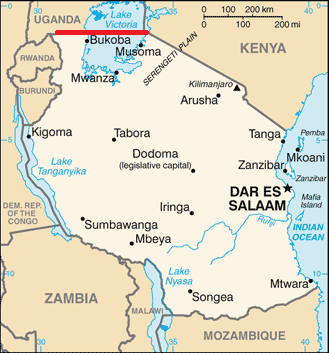
The 1st parallel south forms most of Tanzania's northern border with Uganda, and a short section of its border with Kenya.

The 1st parallel south is a circle of latitude that is 1 degree (69.2 miles/111.36 kilometers) south of the Earth's equatorial plane. It crosses the Atlantic Ocean, Africa, the Indian Ocean, Southeast Asia, Australasia, the Pacific Ocean and South America.

The parallel defines most of the border between Uganda and Tanzania, and a very short section of the border between Kenya and Tanzania.

=== Around the world ===
Starting at the Prime Meridian and heading eastwards, the parallel 1° south passes through:

Coordinates	Country, territory or sea	Notes
1°0′S 0°0′E	Atlantic Ocean	
1°0′S 8°52′E	Gabon	
1°0′S 14°25′E	Republic of the Congo	
1°0′S 17°20′E	Democratic Republic of the Congo	
1°0′S 29°35′E	Uganda	
1°0′S 30°45′E	Uganda / Tanzania border	Mostly in Lake Victoria
1°0′S 33°56′E	Kenya / Tanzania border	A short section of the border (about 11 km (6.8 mi)), entirely within Lake Victoria
1°0′S 34°1′E	Kenya	Passing about 30 km (19 mi) north of the capital, Nairobi
1°0′S 41°7′E	Somalia	
1°0′S 42°2′E	Indian Ocean	Passing just south of Addu Atoll, Maldives
1°0′S 98°39′E	Indonesia	Island of Siberut
1°0′S 98°56′E	Mentawai Strait	
1°0′S 100°21′E	Indonesia	Island of Sumatra - passing just south of Padang
1°0′S 103°59′E	Karimata Strait	
1°0′S 109°27′E	Indonesia	Islands of Maya Karimata and Borneo; West Kalimantan; Central Kalimantan; East Kalimantan; Passing just south of Nusantara (at 0°58′23″S 116°42′31″E)
1°0′S 117°8′E	Makassar Strait	
1°0′S 119°28′E	Indonesia	Island of Sulawesi
1°0′S 120°30′E	Gulf of Tomini	
1°0′S 121°23′E	Indonesia	Island of Sulawesi
1°0′S 122°47′E	Banda Sea	
1°0′S 123°12′E	Indonesia	Island of Sulawesi
1°0′S 123°22′E	Molucca Sea	
1°0′S 128°19′E	Indonesia	Island of Damar
1°0′S 128°24′E	Halmahera Sea	
1°0′S 130°38′E	Indonesia	Islands of Salawati and New Guinea
1°0′S 134°3′E	Cenderawasih Bay	
1°0′S 134°48′E	Indonesia	Island of Numfor
1°0′S 134°57′E	Cenderawasih Bay	
1°0′S 135°48′E	Indonesia	Island of Biak
1°0′S 136°8′E	Pacific Ocean	Passing just north of the atolls of Pelleluhu and Heina, Papua New Guinea; Passing just south of the Kaniet Islands, Papua New Guinea; Passing just south of Banaba Island, Kiribati; Passing between the atolls of Nonouti and Tabiteuea, Kiribati
1°0′S 91°26′W	Ecuador	Island of Isabela
1°0′S 91°4′W	Pacific Ocean	Passing just south of the island of San Cristóbal, Ecuador
1°0′S 80°51′W	Ecuador	Passing just south of Manta
1°0′S 75°23′W	Peru	
1°0′S 74°16′W	Colombia	
1°0′S 69°25′W	Brazil	Amazonas; Roraima; Amazonas; Pará; Amapá; Maranhão; Pará - islands of Grande do Gurupá and Marajó, and the mainland
1°0′S 46°11′W	Atlantic Ocean	

== 2nd parallel south ==
2nd parallel south (interactive map)

The 2nd parallel south is a circle of latitude that is 2 degrees south of the Earth's equatorial plane. It crosses the Atlantic Ocean, Africa, the Indian Ocean, Southeast Asia, Australasia, the Pacific Ocean and South America.

Under this latitude, the illumination time at the summer solstice is 12 hours and 14 minutes, and the illumination time at the winter solstice is 12 hours and 0 minutes

At 2° south latitude, one degree of longitude is equivalent to 111.252 km.

=== Around the world ===
Starting at the prime meridian and heading eastwards, the parallel 2° south passes through:

Coordinates	Country, territory or sea	Notes
2°0′S 0°0′E	Atlantic Ocean	
2°0′S 9°21′E	Gabon	
2°0′S 12°28′E	Republic of the Congo	
2°0′S 12°52′E	Gabon	
2°0′S 14°15′E	Republic of the Congo	
2°0′S 16°24′E	Democratic Republic of the Congo	The border with Rwanda is in Lake Kivu
2°0′S 29°9′E	Rwanda	Passing just south of Kigali
2°0′S 30°51′E	Tanzania	Passing through Lake Victoria, including Ukerewe Island
2°0′S 35°50′E	Kenya	
2°0′S 41°17′E	Indian Ocean	
2°0′S 99°33′E	Indonesia	A small island just north of the island of Sipura
2°0′S 99°34′E	Mentawai Strait	
2°0′S 100°52′E	Indonesia	Island of Sumatra
2°0′S 104°47′E	Bangka Strait	
2°0′S 105°7′E	Indonesia	Island of Bangka
2°0′S 106°8′E	Karimata Strait	
2°0′S 110°6′E	Indonesia	Island of Borneo; West Kalimantan; Central Kalimantan; South Kalimantan; East Kalimantan
2°0′S 116°27′E	Makassar Strait	
2°0′S 119°13′E	Indonesia	Island of Sulawesi
2°0′S 121°27′E	Banda Sea	
2°0′S 123°48′E	Indonesia	Island of Salue Besar in the Banggai archipelago
2°0′S 123°51′E	Banda Sea	
2°0′S 124°18′E	Indonesia	Islands of Seho and Taliabu
2°0′S 124°33′E	Banda Sea	Passing just south of the island of Mangole, Indonesia
2°0′S 125°53′E	Indonesia	Island of Sanana
2°0′S 125°58′E	Ceram Sea	Passing just south of the island of Gomumu, Indonesia
2°0′S 129°54′E	Indonesia	Island of Misool
2°0′S 130°23′E	Ceram Sea	
2°0′S 132°0′E	Indonesia	Islands of New Guinea and Meos Waar
2°0′S 134°25′E	Cenderawasih Bay	Passing just south of the island of Yapen, Indonesia
2°0′S 137°12′E	Indonesia	Island of New Guinea
2°0′S 139°3′E	Pacific Ocean	Passing just south of the Ninigo Islands, Papua New Guinea
2°0′S 146°34′E	Papua New Guinea	Island of Manus
2°0′S 147°11′E	Seeadler Harbour	
2°0′S 147°23′E	Papua New Guinea	Los Negros Island
2°0′S 147°24′E	Pacific Ocean	Passing just north of Tong Island, Papua New Guinea; Passing just south of Onotoa atoll, Kiribati
2°0′S 80°45′W	Ecuador	Passing just north of Guayaquil
2°0′S 75°57′W	Peru	
2°0′S 73°6′W	Colombia	
2°0′S 69°32′W	Brazil	Amazonas; Pará; Maranhão - passing just north of São Luís
2°0′S 44°29′W	Atlantic Ocean	

== 3rd parallel south ==
3rd parallel south (interactive map)

The 3rd parallel south is a circle of latitude that is 3 degrees south of the Earth's equatorial plane. It crosses the Atlantic Ocean, Africa, the Indian Ocean, Southeast Asia, Australasia, the Pacific Ocean and South America.

=== Around the world ===
Starting at the Prime Meridian and heading eastwards, the parallel 3° south passes through:

Coordinates	Country, territory or sea	Notes
3°0′S 0°0′E	Atlantic Ocean	
3°0′S 10°18′E	Gabon	Passing just south of Tchibanga
3°0′S 11°48′E	Republic of the Congo	
3°0′S 16°11′E	Democratic Republic of the Congo	
3°0′S 29°9′E	Burundi	
3°0′S 30°50′E	Tanzania	
3°0′S 37°35′E	Kenya	
3°0′S 40°13′E	Indian Ocean	
3°0′S 100°11′E	Indonesia	Island of South Pagai
3°0′S 100°26′E	Mentawai Strait	
3°0′S 101°27′E	Indonesia	Island of Sumatra - passing through Palembang
3°0′S 106°3′E	Bangka Strait	
3°0′S 106°26′E	Indonesia	Islands of Bangka and Lepar
3°0′S 106°53′E	Java Sea	
3°0′S 107°33′E	Indonesia	Island of Belitung
3°0′S 108°12′E	Java Sea	
3°0′S 110°37′E	Indonesia	Island of Borneo; West Kalimantan; Central Kalimantan
3°0′S 111°9′E	Java Sea	
3°0′S 111°48′E	Indonesia	Island of Borneo; Central Kalimantan; South Kalimantan
3°0′S 116°17′E	Makassar Strait	
3°0′S 118°50′E	Indonesia	Island of Sulawesi (South Peninsula)
3°0′S 120°12′E	Gulf of Boni	
3°0′S 121°5′E	Indonesia	Island of Sulawesi (South-east Peninsula)
3°0′S 122°15′E	Banda Sea	Passing just north of the island of Buru, Indonesia
3°0′S 127°51′E	Indonesia	Islands of Boano and Seram
3°0′S 130°23′E	Ceram Sea	
3°0′S 132°24′E	Indonesia	Island of New Guinea
3°0′S 134°51′E	Cenderawasih Bay	
3°0′S 135°51′E	Indonesia	Island of New Guinea
3°0′S 141°0′E	Papua New Guinea	Island of New Guinea
3°0′S 142°2′E	Pacific Ocean	Bismarck Sea, passing just south of the Purdy Islands, Papua New Guinea; Passing just south of the island of Dyaul, Papua New Guinea
3°0′S 151°18′E	Papua New Guinea	Island of New Ireland
3°0′S 151°34′E	Pacific Ocean	
3°0′S 152°2′E	Papua New Guinea	Island of Tabar
3°0′S 152°3′E	Pacific Ocean	Passing through the Lihir Group, Papua New Guinea; Passing just north of the Nuguria islands, Papua New Guinea; Passing just south of Kanton Island, Kiribati; Passing just north of Enderbury Island, Kiribati
3°0′S 80°22′W	Ecuador	Puná Island
3°0′S 80°7′W	Pacific Ocean	Jambelí Channel
3°0′S 79°50′W	Ecuador	
3°0′S 77°49′W	Peru	
3°0′S 70°11′W	Colombia	
3°0′S 69°42′W	Brazil	Amazonas - passing through Manaus; Pará; Maranhão; Piauí; Ceará
3°0′S 39°42′W	Atlantic Ocean	

== 4th parallel south ==
4th parallel south (interactive map)

The 4th parallel south is a circle of latitude that is 4 degrees south of the Earth's equatorial plane. It crosses the Atlantic Ocean, Africa, the Indian Ocean, Southeast Asia, Australasia, the Pacific Ocean and South America.

=== Around the world ===
Starting at the Prime Meridian and heading eastwards, the parallel 4° south passes through:

Coordinates	Country, territory or sea	Notes
4°0′S 0°0′E	Atlantic Ocean	
4°0′S 11°13′E	Republic of the Congo	
4°0′S 15°42′E	Democratic Republic of the Congo	
4°0′S 29°6′E	Lake Tanganyika	
4°0′S 29°26′E	Burundi	
4°0′S 30°13′E	Tanzania	
4°0′S 38°15′E	Kenya	Passing through Mombasa
4°0′S 39°44′E	Indian Ocean	Passing between Denis Island and Aride Island, Seychelles
4°0′S 102°19′E	Indonesia	Island of Sumatra
4°0′S 105°52′E	Java Sea	
4°0′S 114°37′E	Indonesia	South Kalimantan, island of Borneo
4°0′S 115°2′E	Java Sea	
4°0′S 116°2′E	Indonesia	South Kalimantan, island of Laut
4°0′S 116°10′E	Makassar Strait	
4°0′S 119°34′E	Indonesia	Island of Sulawesi (South Peninsula)
4°0′S 120°20′E	Gulf of Boni	
4°0′S 121°25′E	Indonesia	Island of Sulawesi (South-east Peninsula)
4°0′S 122°38′E	Banda Sea	
4°0′S 123°0′E	Indonesia	Island of Wowoni
4°0′S 123°3′E	Banda Sea	Passing just south of the island of Buru, Indonesia; Passing just south of the island of Ambon, Indonesia; Passing just south of the island of Seram, Indonesia
4°0′S 131°12′E	Indonesia	Islands of Seram Laut
4°0′S 131°26′E	Ceram Sea	
4°0′S 132°51′E	Indonesia	Island of New Guinea
4°0′S 133°19′E	Arafura Sea	
4°0′S 134°11′E	Indonesia	Islands of Aiduma and New Guinea
4°0′S 141°0′E	Papua New Guinea	Island of New Guinea
4°0′S 144°34′E	Pacific Ocean	Bismarck Sea, passing just north of Manam island, Papua New Guinea
4°0′S 152°35′E	Papua New Guinea	Island of New Ireland
4°0′S 152°56′E	Pacific Ocean	
4°0′S 153°42′E	Papua New Guinea	Island of Babase
4°0′S 153°43′E	Pacific Ocean	Passing just south of McKean Island, Kiribati; Passing just south of Birnie Island, Kiribati; Passing just north of Manra Island, Kiribati; Passing just south of Rawaki Island, Kiribati
4°0′S 154°58′W	Kiribati	Malden Island
4°0′S 154°54′W	Pacific Ocean	
4°0′S 80°59′W	Peru	
4°0′S 80°26′W	Ecuador	For about 13 km (8.1 mi)
4°0′S 80°19′W	Peru	For about 7 km (4.3 mi)
4°0′S 80°15′W	Ecuador	
4°0′S 78°31′W	Peru	
4°0′S 70°10′W	Colombia	
4°0′S 69°53′W	Brazil	Amazonas; Pará; Maranhão; Piauí; Ceará - passing just south of Fortaleza
4°0′S 38°14′W	Atlantic Ocean	Passing just south of Rocas Atoll, Brazil; Passing just south of Fernando de Noronha island, Brazil

== 5th parallel south ==
5th parallel south (interactive map)

The 5th parallel south is a circle of latitude that is 5 degrees south of the Earth's equatorial plane. It crosses the Atlantic Ocean, Africa, the Indian Ocean, Southeast Asia, Australasia, the Pacific Ocean and South America.

=== Around the world ===
Starting at the Prime Meridian and heading eastwards, the parallel 5° south passes through:

Co-ordinates	Country, territory or sea	Notes
5°0′S 0°0′E	Atlantic Ocean	
5°0′S 11°59′E	Republic of the Congo	For about 7 km
5°0′S 12°2′E	Angola	Cabinda exclave
5°0′S 12°38′E	Democratic Republic of the Congo	
5°0′S 29°7′E	Lake Tanganyika	
5°0′S 29°46′E	Tanzania	
5°0′S 39°8′E	Indian Ocean	Pemba Channel
5°0′S 39°40′E	Tanzania	Island of Pemba
5°0′S 39°52′E	Indian Ocean	Passing through the Amirante Islands, Seychelles; Passing just south of Mahé island, Seychelles; Passing just north of Peros Banhos atoll, British Indian Ocean Territory
5°0′S 103°45′E	Indonesia	Island of Sumatra
5°0′S 105°52′E	Java Sea	Passing close by several small islands of Indonesia
5°0′S 119°28′E	Indonesia	Island of Sulawesi
5°0′S 120°18′E	Banda Sea	Gulf of Boni - passing just north of the island of Kabaena, Indonesia
5°0′S 122°23′E	Indonesia	Islands of Muna and Buton
5°0′S 122°57′E	Banda Sea	Passing close by several small islands of Indonesia
5°0′S 137°15′E	Indonesia	Island of New Guinea
5°0′S 141°0′E	Papua New Guinea	Island of New Guinea
5°0′S 145°47′E	Pacific Ocean	Bismarck Sea, passing close by several small islands of Papua New Guinea
5°0′S 151°15′E	Papua New Guinea	Island of New Britain
5°0′S 151°57′E	Pacific Ocean	Solomon Sea: Passing just south of the island of New Ireland, Papua New Guinea; Passing just north of Buka Island, Papua New Guinea; An unnamed part of the ocean; Passing just north of Ontong Java Atoll, Solomon Islands; Passing just south of Nikumaroro atoll, Kiribati
5°0′S 81°4′W	Peru	Piura
5°0′S 79°3′W	Ecuador	For about 4 km at the southernmost point of the country
5°0′S 79°0′W	Peru	Cajamarca; Amazonas; Loreto
5°0′S 72°35′W	Brazil	Amazonas; Pará; Maranhão; Piauí; Ceará; Rio Grande do Norte
5°0′S 36°50′W	Atlantic Ocean	

== See also ==
- Equator
- Circles of latitude between the Equator and the 5th parallel north
- Circles of latitude between the 5th parallel south and the 10th parallel south
