= 3rd parallel =

3rd parallel may refer to:

- 3rd parallel north, a circle of latitude in the Northern Hemisphere
- 3rd parallel south, a circle of latitude in the Southern Hemisphere
