= Mentawai =

Mentawai may refer to:

- Mentawai Islands, Indonesia
  - Mentawai Strait
  - Mentawai people, ethnic group of Indonesia
  - Mentawai language, their Austronesian language
