= 4th parallel =

4th parallel may refer to:

- 4th parallel north, a circle of latitude in the Northern Hemisphere
- 4th parallel south, a circle of latitude in the Southern Hemisphere
