= Tombulilato =

Village in Gorontalo, Indonesia

Coordinates: 0.31°N 123.346°E

Tombulilato or Tombalilatoe is a village in Gorontalo, Indonesia. It is located on the south coast of Gorontalo, at the point that marks the limit between the Molucca Sea and the Gulf of Tomini. Tombulilato is located in the Bone Raya district of Bone Bolango Regency, province of Gorontalo. The village covers an area of 12,500 hectares and is bordered by River Andagile on the east.
