= 2nd parallel =

2nd parallel may refer to:

- 2nd parallel north, a circle of latitude in the Northern Hemisphere
- 2nd parallel south, a circle of latitude in the Southern Hemisphere
