= 1st parallel =

1st parallel may refer to:

- 1st parallel north, a circle of latitude in the Northern Hemisphere
- 1st parallel south, a circle of latitude in the Southern Hemisphere
