= Eastern Peninsula =

East Peninsula
- Location within Sulawesi

Geography
- Location: Southeast Asia
- Coordinates: 1.33333°S 122°E
- Adjacent to: Molucca Sea; Banda Sea; Gulf of Tolo; Gulf of Tomini

Administration
- Indonesia
- Province: Central Sulawesi

The East Peninsula is one of the four principal peninsulas on the island of Sulawesi, Indonesia. It is part of the province of Central Sulawesi.

It stretches east from the central part of the island, forming the southern boundary of the Gulf of Tomini and the northwestern boundary of the Gulf of Tolo. The island of Peleng lies off the peninsula's southern coast, while the Sula Islands lie to the east.
