= Halmahera Sea =

Sea in the Australasian Mediterranean

- Laut Halmahera (Indonesian)
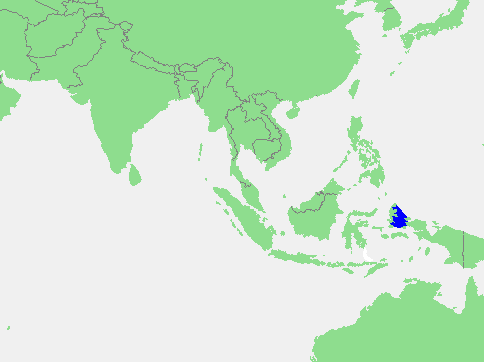
- Location of the Halmahera Sea within Southeast Asia

- Location within Indonesia
- Coordinates: 1°S 129°E
- Type: Sea
- Basin countries: Indonesia
- Surface area: 95,000 km^{2} (37,000 sq mi)

The Halmahera Sea (Indonesian: Laut Halmahera; Indonesian pronunciation: [ˌlaʊt̪̚ halmaˈhera]) is a regional sea located in the central eastern part of the Australasian Mediterranean Sea. It is centered at about 1°S and 129°E and is bordered by the Pacific Ocean to the north, Halmahera to the west, Waigeo and Southwest Papua to the east, and the Seram Sea to the south. It covers about 95,000 km^{2} (about 37,000 miles^{2}) and its topography comprises a number of separate basins and ridges, the chief of which is the Halmahera Basin reaching a depth of 2,039 m.

On its western side, the Halmahera Sea includes three large gulfs or bays which cut deep into the coast of Halmahera island, turning the east coast of that island into four huge peninsulas. These three inlets comprise Wedi Bay (Teluk Wesi) in the south (between the southern and southeastern peninsulas), Buli Bay (Teluk Buli) in the centre (between the southeastern and northeastern peninsulas) and Kao Bay (Teluk Kao) in the north (between the northeastern and northern peninsulas). A notable fourth inlet is Galela Bay (Teluk Galela) further to the north, which projects into the coast of North Halmahera Regency.

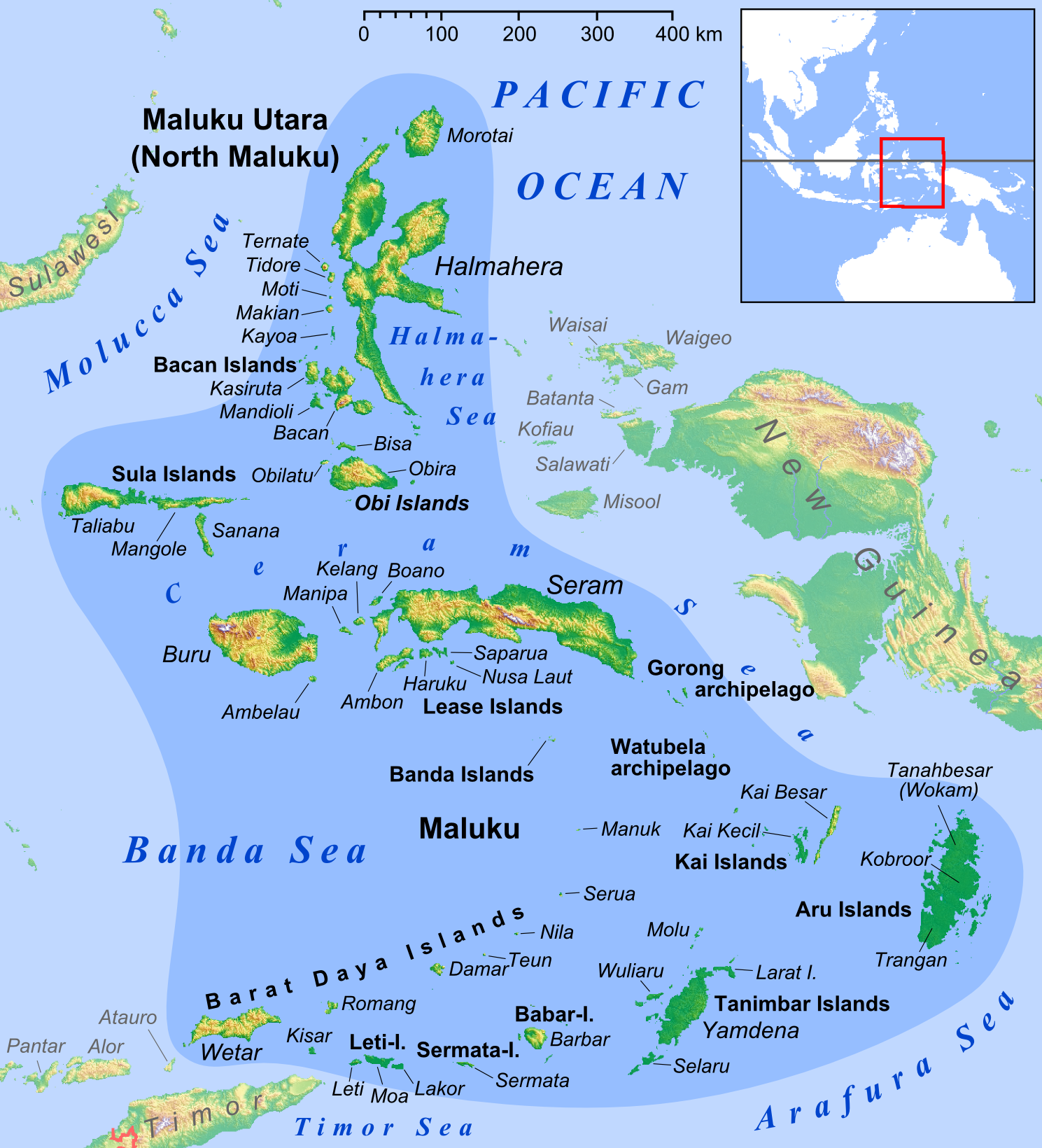
Halmahera Sea in the north of Maluku Islands

== Extent ==
The International Hydrographic Organization (IHO) defines the Halmahera Sea as being one of the waters of the East Indian Archipelago. The IHO defines its limits as follows:

On the North A line from Wajaboela (Morotai) to Tg. Djodjefa, the Northern point of Halmahera.

On the East. A line from Tg. Gorango, the Northeastern point of Morotai Island, through Sajang and Kawé Islands to the Western extremes of Waigeo and Batanta Islands across to the Northwest point of Samawati Island, down the coast to Tg. Menonket its Southwest point, and thence to Tg. Sele, New Guinea (1°26′S 130°56′E).

On the South. The Northern limit of Ceram Sea between Obi Major and New Guinea [A line from ... Obi Major ... Tanjong Seranmaloleo its Eastern extreme, thence through Tobalai, Kekek, Pisang and Kofiau Islands to Tanjong Sele (1°26′S 130°55′E), the Western point of New Guinea].

On the West. The Southern limit of Molukka Sea [sic] between Halmahera and Obi Major [A line from the Southern extreme of Halmahera to the North point of Bisa (Setile) Island, thence to the Northern extreme of Obi Major].
