= East Indian Archipelago =

Seas of Indonesia

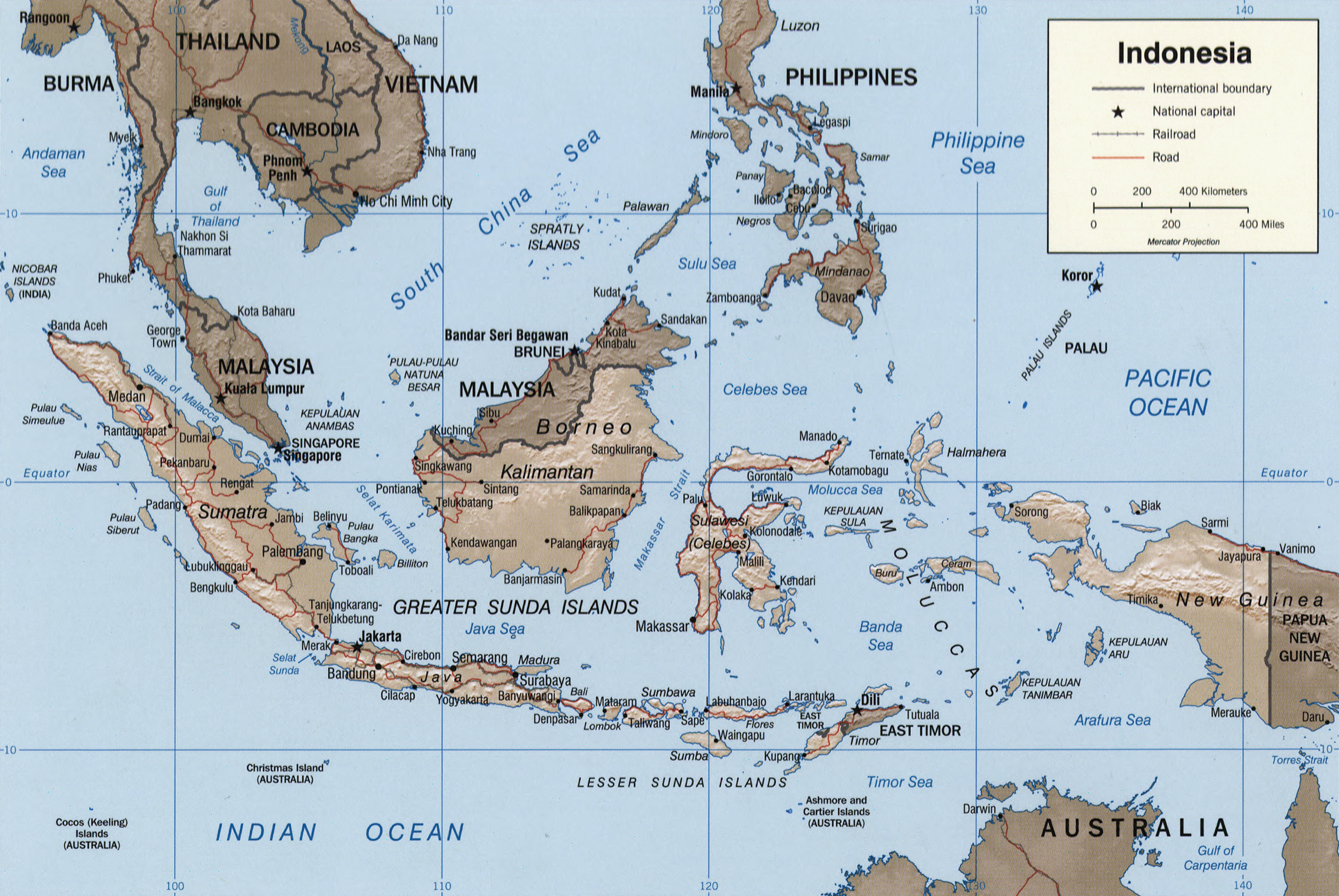
Map of Indonesia showing waters of the East Indian Archipelago

The East Indian Archipelago is an area designated by the International Hydrographic Organization (IHO). It encompasses twelve seas, two gulfs, and one strait in the East Indies (Southeast Asia).

== Seas ==
In draft 4 of the IHO's publication S-23 Limits of Oceans and Seas, 2002, the area is described in a chapter under the heading South China & Eastern Archipelagic Seas.

The waters of the East Indian Archipelago are:

1. Arafura Sea – 650,000 km^{2} (250,000 sq mi)
2. Timor Sea – 610,000 km^{2} (240,000 sq mi)
3. Celebes Sea – 472,000 km^{2} (182,000 sq mi)
4. Banda Sea – 470,000 km^{2} (180,000 sq mi)
5. Java Sea – 320,000 km^{2} (120,000 sq mi)
6. Sulu Sea – 260,000 km^{2} (100,000 sq mi)
7. Molucca Sea – 200,000 km^{2} (77,000 sq mi)
8. Flores Sea – 121,000 km^{2} (47,000 sq mi)
9. Seram Sea – 120,000 km^{2} (46,000 sq mi)
10. Savu Sea – 105,000 km^{2} (41,000 sq mi)
11. Halmahera Sea – 95,000 km^{2} (37,000 sq mi)
12. Bali Sea – 45,000 km^{2} (17,000 sq mi)
13. Gulf of Boni
14. Gulf of Tomini
15. Makassar Strait

Six of the seas, the two gulfs, and the strait are wholly waters of Indonesia. The Sulu Sea, lying between the Philippines and Sabah (a state of Malaysia on the island of Borneo), is not in Indonesian waters. The other five seas are partially Indonesian.

Five countries have exclusive economic zones (EEZ) that extend into one or more of the five seas that are partially Indonesian. Apart from the Sulu Sea, Philippine and Malaysian EEZs also extend into the Celebes Sea. The East Timor EEZ is wholly within the Savu, Banda, and Timor Seas. Australia's EEZ extends into both the Timor and Arafura Seas and Papua New Guinea's EEZ extends into the Arafura Sea from its far southwest coast.

== See also ==
- Australasian Mediterranean Sea
- Maritime Southeast Asia
