= Minahasa Peninsula =

North peninsula on the Indonesian island of Sulawesi

Native name: Semenanjung Minahasa (id)
- The Minahasa Peninsula is the long peninsula in northern Sulawesi, north of the Gulf of Tomini.

- Location within Sulawesi

Geography
- Location: Southeast Asia
- Coordinates: 0°50′00″N 121°0′00″E
- Adjacent to: Celebes Sea; Molucca Sea; Gulf of Tomini; Makassar Strait

Administration
- Indonesia
- Province: North Sulawesi; Gorontalo; Central Sulawesi
- Largest settlement: Manado

The Minahasa Peninsula, or spelled Minahassa, also known as the Northern Sulawesi Peninsula or Gorontalo Peninsula, is one of the four principal peninsulas on the Indonesian island of Sulawesi. It stretches north from the central part of the island, before turning to the east and forming the northern boundary of the Gulf of Tomini and the southern boundary of the Celebes Sea.

The peninsula is divided into North Sulawesi and Gorontalo provinces, as well as part of Central Sulawesi. Its largest cities are Manado and Gorontalo, while Palu is located at its base.

The Minahasan people live in the eastern peninsula. The Minahasan languages, a branch of the Philippine languages, are spoken on the peninsula.
