= Gulf of Boni =

Gulf of the Banda Sea in Sulawesi, Indonesia

Gulf of Boni/Bone
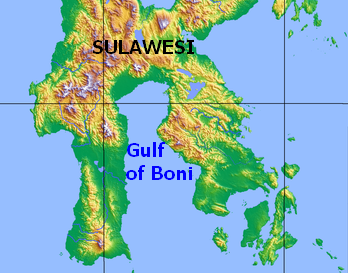
- Map of the Gulf of Boni

- Location within Sulawesi
- Location: Sulawesi
- Coordinates: 4°0′S 120°45′E
- Basin countries: Indonesia

The Gulf of Boni (Indonesian: Teluk Bone), also known as the Gulf of Bone, Bay of Boni, and Bone Bay, is the gulf which divides the South and Southeast Peninsulas of the island of Sulawesi (Celebes) in Indonesia. It opens on the south into the Banda Sea.

== Extent ==
The International Hydrographic Organization (IHO) defines the Gulf of Boni (or Bone) as being one of the divisions of the East Indian Archipelago. It is defined as the waters north of the "line from Tanjung Lassa, Celebes, to the North point of Kabaena Island (5°05′S 121°52′E) and thence up this meridian to the coast of Celebes".

== See also ==
- Gulf of Tomini
- Gulf of Tolo
