= Gulf of Tolo =

Body of water in Indonesia

- also known as the Bay of Tolo
- Teluk Tolo (Indonesian)
- Location within Sulawesi
- Location: Southeast Asia
- Coordinates: 2°00′00″S 122°30′00″E
- Type: Bay
- Primary inflows: Banda Sea
- Basin countries: Indonesia
- References: Teluk Tolo: Indonesia National Geospatial-Intelligence Agency, Bethesda, MD, USA

The Gulf of Tolo (Indonesian: Teluk Tolo or Towori), also known as the Bay of Tolo, is the body of water lying between the eastern and south-eastern peninsulas of the island of Sulawesi (Celebes) in Indonesia.

Unlike the Gulf of Tomini to its north or the Gulf of Boni to its south-west, the Bay of Tolo is not recognized as a gulf by the International Hydrographic Organization. Instead, it is included in the area of the Banda Sea.

== See also ==
- Gulf of Tomini
- Gulf of Boni
