= Sulawesi =

Region and island in Indonesia

Native name: ᨔᨘᨒᨓᨙᨔᨗ
- Satellite photo of Sulawesi; the smoke from forest fires is visible

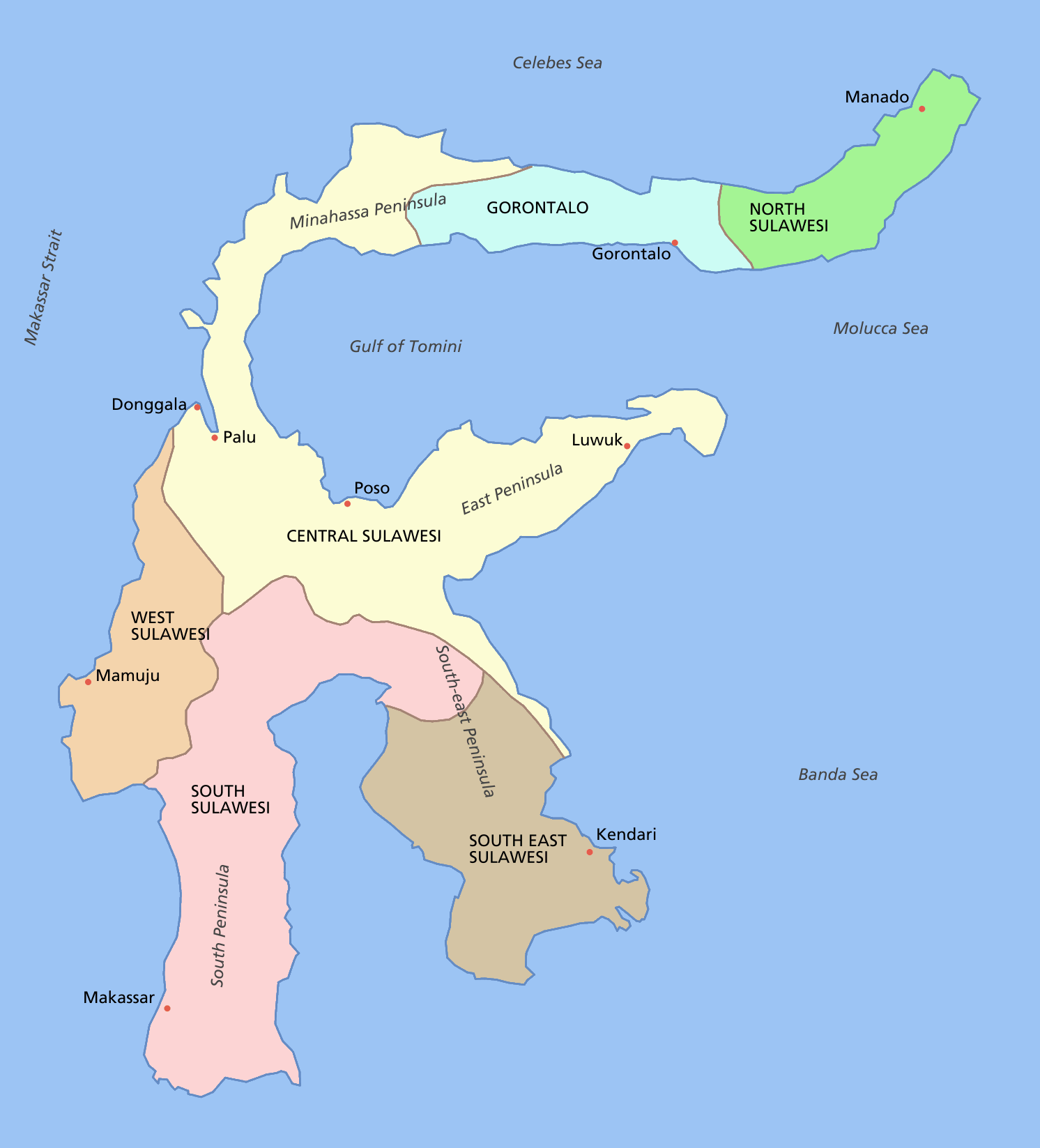
- Provincial division of Sulawesi
- Interactive map of Sulawesi
- Other name: Celebes
- Etymology: Possibly from sula (dagger, spike) and besi (iron), or Portuguese Celebres, 'famous'

Geography
- Location: Indonesia
- Coordinates: 02°S 121°E
- Archipelago: Greater Sunda Islands
- Adjacent to: Makassar Strait (west); Banda Sea (east); Flores Sea (south); Molucca Sea (northeast); Celebes Sea (north); Gulf of Tomini (between East and Minahassa Peninsulas); Gulf of Tolo (between East and Southeast Peninsulas); Gulf of Bone (between Southern and Southeastern Peninsulas)
- Area: 186,064.34 km^{2} (71,839.84 sq mi)
- Area rank: 11th
- Highest elevation: 3,478 m (11411 ft)
- Highest point: Latimojong (Rantemario)

Administration
- Indonesia
- Provinces: North; Central; West; South; Southeast; Gorontalo
- Largest settlement: Makassar (pop. 1,432,200)

Demographics
- Population: 21,054,875 (mid 2025 estimate)
- Population rank: 13th
- Pop. density: 113.2/km^{2} (293.2/sq mi)
- Languages: Native languages: Gorontalo–Mongondow languages; Sangiric languages; Minahasan languages; Celebic languages (incl. Tolaki); South Sulawesi languages (incl. Buginese and Makassarese); Indonesian, Manado Malay, Indonesian Bajau and other
- Ethnic groups: Buginese; Makassarese; Minahasan; Tolaki; Gorontalo; Mandar; Kaili; Pamona; Torajan; Mamasa; Butonese; Bajau and others

Additional information
- Time zone: Central Indonesia Time (UTC+8)

Sulawesi (/ˌsuːləˈweɪsi/ SOO-lə-WAY-see, Indonesian: [ˌsulaˈwesi]; Lontara: ᨔᨘᨒᨓᨙᨔᨗ romanized: Sulawési), also known as Celebes, is an island in Indonesia. One of the four Greater Sunda Islands, and the world's 11th-largest island, it is situated east of Borneo, west of the Maluku Islands, and south of Mindanao and the Sulu Archipelago. Within Indonesia, only Sumatra, Borneo, and Papua are larger in territory, and only Java and Sumatra are more populous.

The landmass of Sulawesi includes four peninsulas: the northern Minahasa Peninsula, the East Peninsula, the South Peninsula, and the Southeast Peninsula. Three gulfs separate these peninsulas: the Gulf of Tomini between the northern Minahasa and East peninsulas, the Gulf of Tolo between the East and Southeast peninsulas, and the Gulf of Boni between the South and Southeast peninsulas. The Makassar Strait runs along the western side of the island and separates the island from Borneo.

== Etymology ==
The name Celebes (/ˈsɛlɪbiːz, səˈliːbiːz/ SEL-ib-eez, sə-LEE-beez) was originally given to the island by Portuguese explorers. First recorded in 1512, it may come from Os Célebres, 'the famous ones', referring to some prominent rocks; the interrelationship between the Portuguese name and the local name Sulawesi is uncertain. Tomé Pires called the northeast tip of the island Punta de Celebres (point of currents) in 1515. From the 17th century, the Dutch were referring to the island as Selebessi.

The second element may come from the Proto-Malayo-Chamic root *bəsi, "iron," but the origin of the first is uncertain. The first part is sometimes derived from Sanskrit शूल॑ (śū́la, 'dagger, stake'), referring to the sharp peninsulas, jagged mountains and treacherous offshore rocks.

== Geography ==
Sulawesi is the world's eleventh-largest island, covering an area of 186,064.34 km^{2} (71,840 sq mi) (including minor islands administered as part of Sulawesi). The central part of the island is ruggedly mountainous, such that the island's peninsulas have traditionally been remote from each other, with better connections by sea than by road. The three bays that divide Sulawesi's peninsulas are, from north to south, the Tomini, the Tolo and the Boni. (Note: Technically, Tomini and Boni are defined as gulfs by the International Hydrographic Organization, while Tolo is considered a bay of the Molucca Sea.) These separate the Minahasa or Northern Peninsula, the East Peninsula, the Southeast Peninsula and the South Peninsula.

The Strait of Makassar runs along the western side of the island. The island is surrounded by Borneo to the west, by the Philippines to the north, by Maluku to the east, and by Flores and Timor to the south.

=== Minor islands ===
The Selayar Islands make up a chain stretching southwards from Southwest Sulawesi into the Flores Sea are administratively part of Sulawesi. The Sangihe Islands and Talaud Islands stretch northward from the northeastern tip of Sulawesi, while Buton and Muna Islands and their neighbors lie off its southeast peninsula, the Togian Islands are in the Gulf of Tomini, and Peleng Island and the Banggai Islands form a cluster between Sulawesi and Maluku. All the above-mentioned islands and many smaller ones off the coasts of Sulawesi are administratively part of Sulawesi's six provinces.

== Geology ==
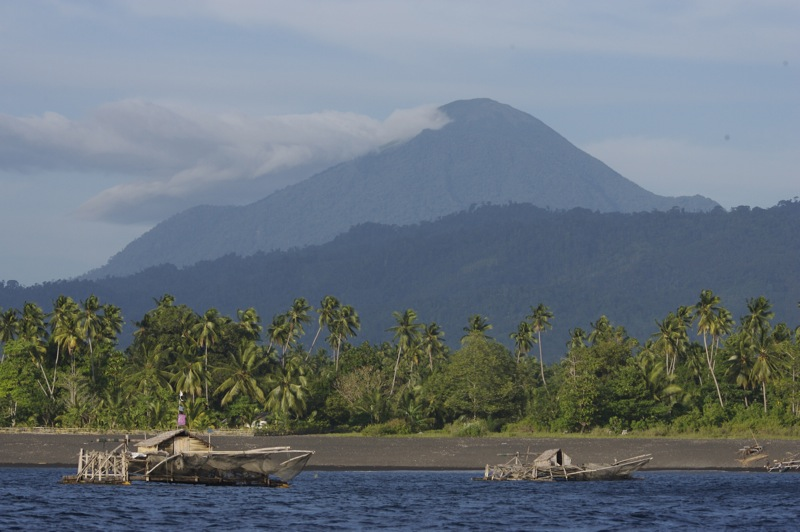
Mount Tongkoko is a volcano in North Sulawesi

The island slopes up from the shores of the deep seas surrounding the island to a high and mostly non-volcanic, mountainous interior. Active volcanoes are found in the northern Minahasa Peninsula, stretching north to the Sangihe Islands. The northern peninsula contains several active volcanoes such as Mount Lokon, Mount Awu, Soputan and Karangetang.

According to plate reconstructions, the island is believed to have been formed by the collision of terranes from the Asian Plate (forming the west and southwest) and from the Australian Plate (forming the southeast and Banggai), with island arcs previously in the Pacific (forming the north and east peninsulas). Because of its several tectonic origins, various faults scar the land and as a result the island is prone to earthquakes, including the deadly 2018 and 2021 quakes.

Off the eastern coast of Sulawesi, the North Banda Sea was created through subduction rollback during the early Miocene. Evidence for this tectonic event lies with the extensive interconnected fault network found in the area, a volcanic seamount with its surrounding ridges, and an accretionary wedge. Off the coast of east Selawesti and Banggai is an accumulation of carbonate rocks from the late Miocene. These carbonates are likely pinnacle reefs and the carbonate platform has a total thickness of around 180–770 meters.

Sulawesi, in contrast to most of the other islands in the biogeographical region of Wallacea, is not truly oceanic, but a composite island at the centre of the Asia-Australia collision zone. Parts of the island were formerly attached to either the Asian or Australian continental margin and became separated from these areas by vicariant processes.

In the west, the opening of the Makassar Strait separated West Sulawesi from Sundaland in the Eocene c. 45 Mya. In the east, the traditional view of collisions of multiple micro-continental fragments sliced from New Guinea with an active volcanic margin in West Sulawesi at different times since the Early Miocene c. 20 Mya has recently been replaced by the hypothesis that extensional fragmentation has followed a single Miocene collision of West Sulawesi with the Sula Spur, the western end of an ancient folded belt of Variscan origin in the Late Paleozoic.

=== Bone Basin ===
The Bone Basin lies between the south-eastern and southern arms of Sulawesi. According to recent studies, the basin has been opened up due to extensional forces. The basin is bounded by normal faults on each side of the basin with each side of the basin surrounded by uplifted basement rock with young sediments found in the middle.

The past geological history has allowed for a large accumulation of carbonates which could lead to a higher potential of oil and gas occurrences. However, the faults present in the basin makes it a very complicated system.

== Prehistory ==
The oldest evidence for humans on Sulawesi are stone tools produced by archaic humans, dating to at least 1.04 million years ago and possibly as old as 1.48 million years ago, found at the Calio site near the village of Ujung in Lilirilau district of Soppeng Regency, southwestern Sulawesi. Other archaic human produced stone tools, dating to over 200,000 to 100,000 years ago, have been found at the Talepu site near Cabenge village, which is also located in the Lilirilau district.

Before October 2014, the settlement of South Sulawesi by modern humans had been dated to c. 30,000 BC on the basis of radiocarbon dates obtained from rock shelters in Maros. No earlier evidence of human occupation had at that point been found, but the island almost certainly formed part of the land bridge used for the settlement of Australia and New Guinea by at least 40,000 BC.

There is no evidence of Homo erectus having reached Sulawesi; crude stone tools first discovered in 1947 on the right bank of the Walanae River at Barru (now part of Bone Regency), which were thought to date to the Pleistocene on the basis of their association with vertebrate fossils, are now thought to date to perhaps 50,000 BC.

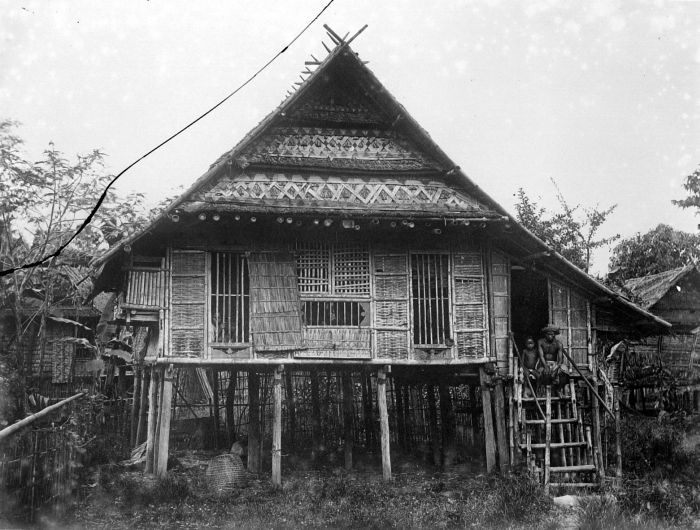
A typical dwelling, taken between 1900 and 1940.

A burial of a woman associated with the hunter-gatherer Toalean culture, dating to 7,000 years ago, has yielded DNA that has provided rare insight into early human migrations in and through the region. Known as Besséʼ, she belonged to a previously unknown lineage of modern humans that diverged from Onge- and Hoabinhian-related lineages around 37,000 years ago. Later population movements appear to have largely displaced this ancestry from Sulawesi.

Following Peter Bellwood's model of a southward migration of Austronesian-speaking farmers (AN), radiocarbon dates from caves in Maros suggest a date in the mid-second millennium BC for the arrival of a group from east Borneo speaking a Proto-South Sulawesi language (PSS). Initial settlement was probably around the mouth of the Sa'dan river, on the northwest coast of the peninsula, although the south coast has also been suggested.

Subsequent migrations across the mountainous landscape resulted in the geographical isolation of PSS speakers and the evolution of their languages into the eight families of the South Sulawesi language group. If each group can be said to have a homeland, that of the Bugis – today the most numerous group – was around lakes Témpé and Sidénréng in the Walennaé depression. Here for some 2,000 years lived the linguistic group that would become the modern Bugis; the archaic name of this group (which is preserved in other local languages) was Ugiq. Despite the fact that today they are closely linked with the Makassarese, the closest linguistic neighbors of the Bugis are the Torajans.

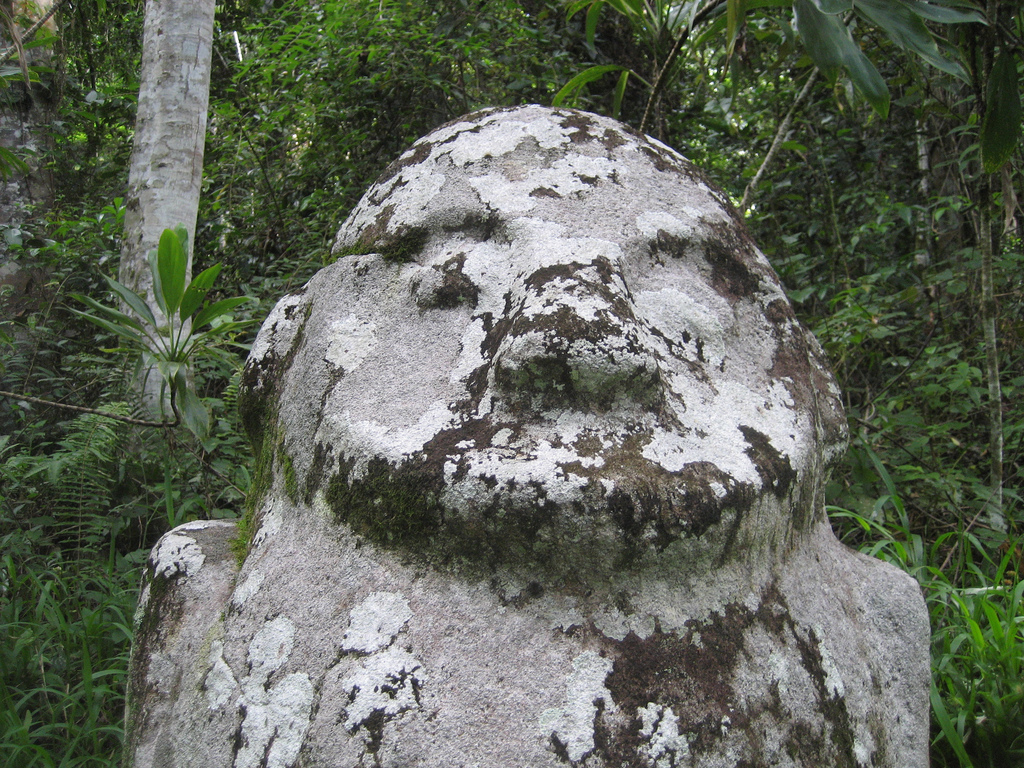
Megalith in Central Sulawesi.

Pre-1200 Bugis society was most likely organized into chiefdoms. Some anthropologists have speculated these chiefdoms would have warred and, in times of peace, interbred. Further, they have speculated that personal security would have been negligible and head-hunting an established cultural practice. The political economy would have been a mixture of hunting and gathering and swidden or shifting agriculture. Speculative planting of wet rice may have taken place along the margins of the lakes and rivers.

In Central Sulawesi, there are more than 400 granite megaliths (Behoa Valley Pokekea Megalithic Site, Bada and Napu valleys within the Lore Lindu National Park), which various archaeological studies have dated to be from 3000 BC to AD 1300. They vary in size from a few centimeters to approximately 4.5 meters (15 ft). The original purpose of the megaliths is unknown. Approximately 30 of the megaliths represent human forms. Other megaliths are in form of large pots (Kalamba) and stone plates (Tutu'na).

=== Cave art ===
In October 2014, it was announced that cave paintings in Maros had been dated as being approximately 40,000 years old. One of a hand was 39,900 years old, which brings it among the oldest known hand stencils in the world.

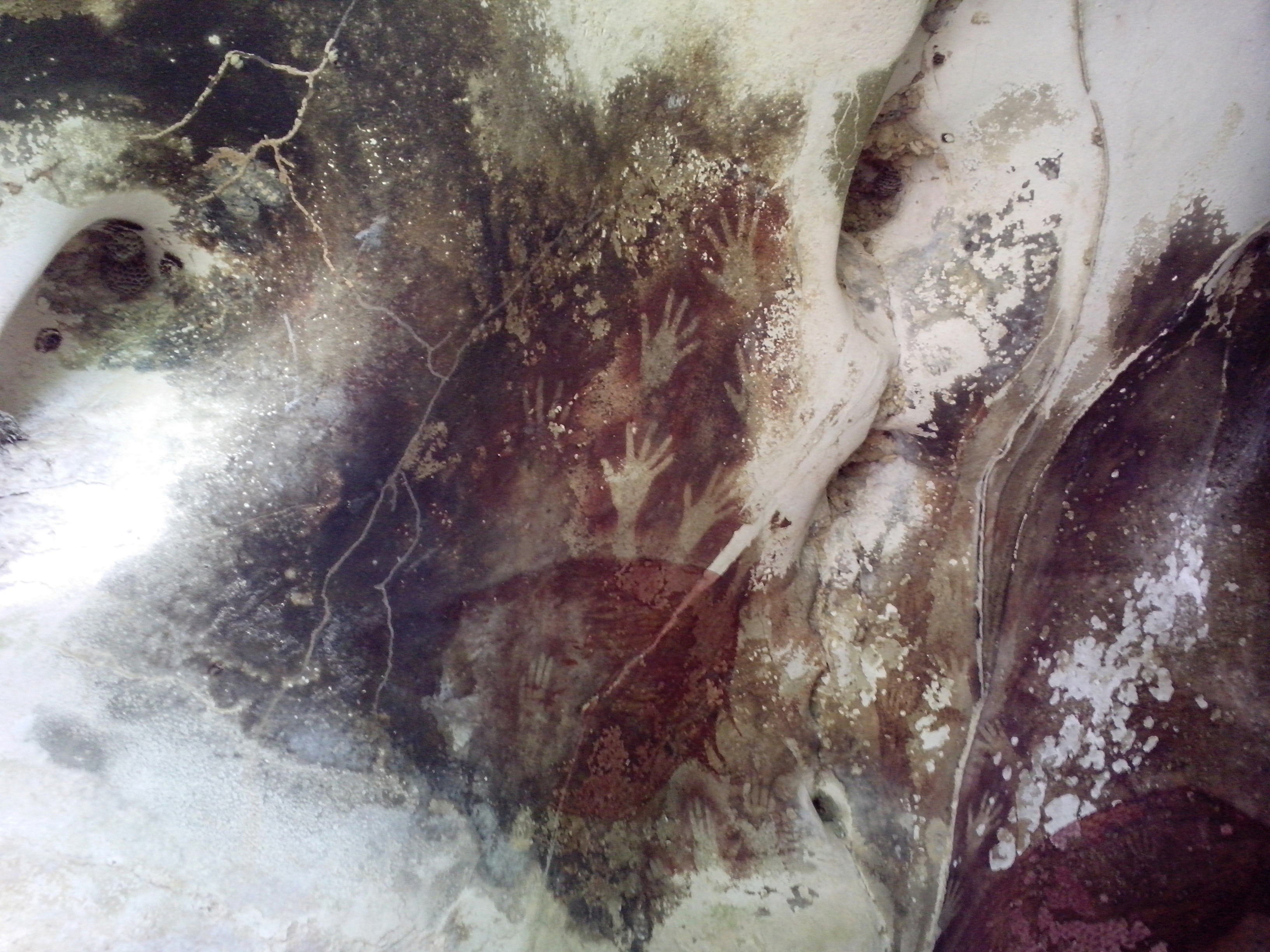
Stencils of right hands in Pettakere Cave in Maros are among the oldest known examples of human artwork

Dr. Maxime Aubert, of Griffith University in Queensland, Australia, said that was the minimum age for the outline in Pettakere Cave in Maros, and added: "Next to it is a pig that has a minimum age of 35,400 years old, and this is one of the oldest figurative depictions in the world, if not the oldest one."

On 11 December 2019, a team of researchers led by Dr. Maxime Aubert announced the discovery of the oldest hunting scenes in prehistoric art in the world that is more than 44,000 years old from the limestone cave of Leang Bulu' Sipong 4. Archaeologists determined the age of the depiction of hunting a pig and buffalo thanks to the calcite 'popcorn', different isotope levels of radioactive uranium and thorium.

In March 2020, two small stone 'plaquettes' were found by Griffith University archaeologists in the Leang Bulu Bettue cave, dated to a time between 26,000 and 14,000 years ago. While one of the stones contained an anoa (water buffalo) and what may be a flower, star, or eye, another depicted astronomic rays of light.

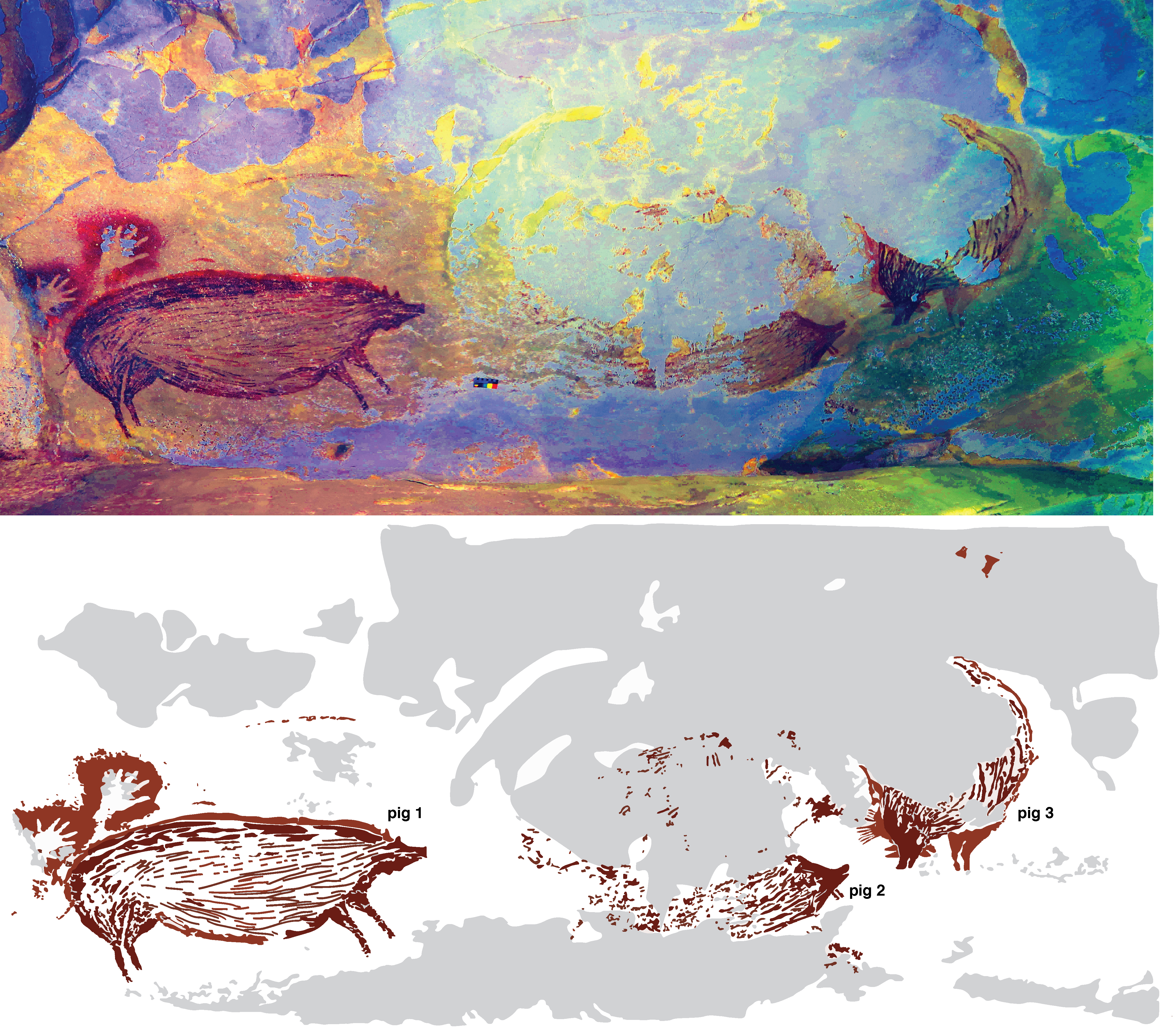
Researchers discovered cave art in Leang Tedongnge, Sulawesi, Indonesia, in 2021, estimated to be at least 45,500 years old, making it the world's oldest known representational artwork.

In January 2021, archaeologists announced the discovery of cave art that is at least 45,500 years old in a Leang Tedongnge cave. According to the journal Science Advances, the cave painting of a warty pig is the earliest evidence of human settlement of the region. An adult male pig, measuring 136 cm x 54 cm and what is likely a Sulawesi or Celebes warty pig (Sus celebensis), was depicted with horn-like facial warts and two hand prints above its hindquarters. According to co-author Adam Brumm, there are two other pigs that are partly preserved and it appears the warty pig was observing a fight between the two other pigs.

The discoveries in Sulawesi have significantly expanded understanding of early human symbolic behavior and have established Indonesia as one of the world's most important locations for the study of prehistoric rock art, with several sites containing some of the oldest known examples of figurative art.

In January 2026, newly discovered images of hand stencils and human figures in caves on the Southwestern peninsula of Sulawesi were dated to be at least 67,800 years old, making them the earliest known evidence of rock art in the world and predating the previous record-holding images in the Cave of Maltravieso by over one thousand years.

== History ==
People from Parigi in traditional clothing in Sulawesi

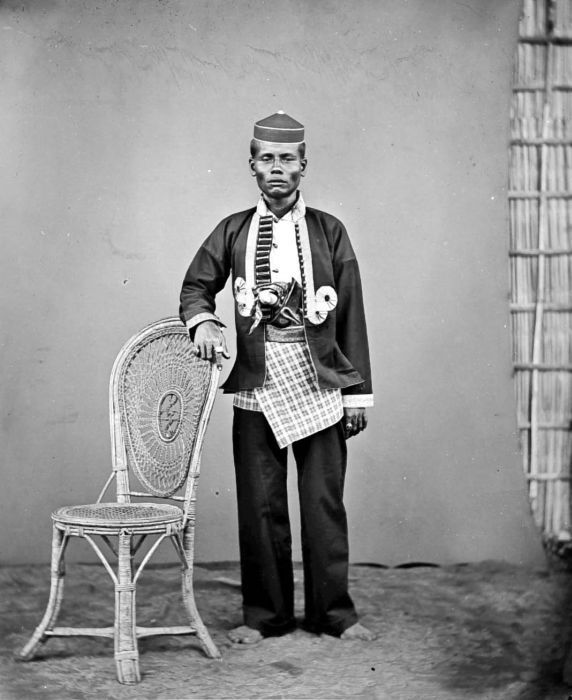
Local chief (1872).

=== Hindu-Buddhist era ===
A bronze Amaravathi statue was discovered at Sikendeng, South Sulawesi near Karama river in 1921 which was dated to 2nd–7th century AD by Bosch (1933). In 1975, small locally made Buddhist statues from 10th-11th century were also discovered in Bontoharu, on the island of Selayar, South Sulawesi.

Starting in the 13th century, access to prestige trade goods and to sources of iron started to alter long-standing cultural patterns and to permit ambitious individuals to build larger political units. It is not known why these two ingredients appeared together; one was perhaps the product of the other.

In 1367, several identified polities located on the island were mentioned in the Javanese manuscript Nagarakretagama dated from the Majapahit period. Canto 14 mentioned polities including Gowa, Makassar, Luwu and Banggai. It seems that by the 14th century, polities in the island were connected in an archipelagic maritime trading network, centered in the Majapahit port in East Java. By 1400, a number of nascent agricultural principalities had arisen in the western Cenrana valley, as well as on the south coast and on the west coast near modern Parepare.

=== Islamic sultanates and European colonial era ===
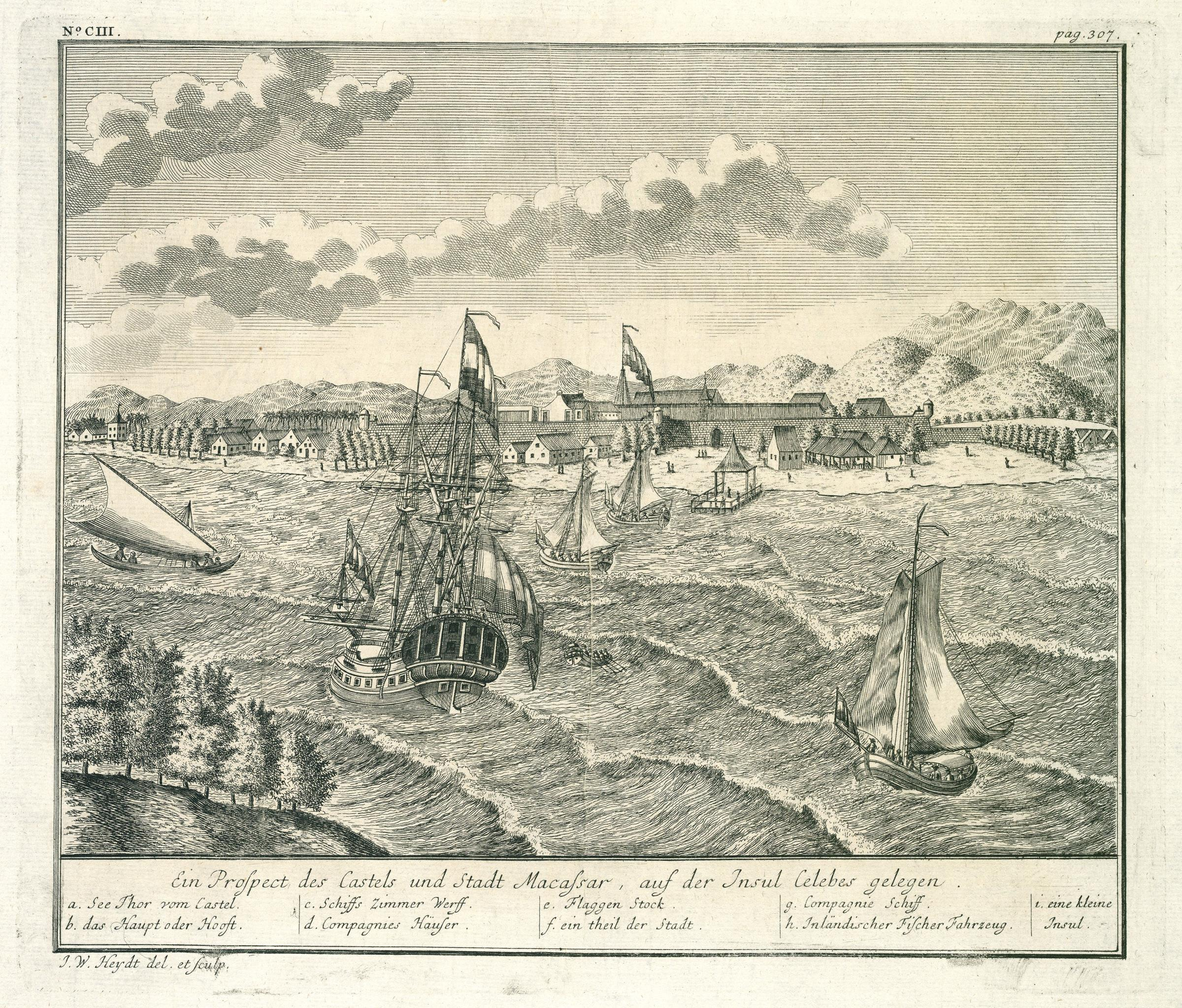
View of the city and Fort Rotterdam in Makassar, Sulawesi, between 1735 and 1744

The first Europeans to visit the island (which they believed to be an archipelago due to its contorted shape) were the Portuguese sailors Simão de Abreu in 1523, and Gomes de Sequeira (among others) in 1525, sent from the Moluccas in search of gold, which the islands had the reputation of producing. A Portuguese base was installed in Makassar in the first decades of the 16th century, lasting until 1665, when it was taken by the Dutch. The Dutch had arrived in Sulawesi in 1605 and were quickly followed by the English, who established a factory in Makassar. From 1660, the Dutch were at war with Gowa, the major Makassar west coast power. In 1669, Admiral Speelman forced the ruler, Sultan Hasanuddin, to sign the Treaty of Bongaya, which handed control of trade to the Dutch East India Company. The Dutch were aided in their conquest by the Bugis warlord Arung Palakka, ruler of the Bugis kingdom of Bone. The Dutch built a fort at Ujung Pandang, while Arung Palakka became the regional overlord and Bone the dominant kingdom. Political and cultural development seems to have slowed as a result of the status quo.

In 1905, the entire island became part of the Dutch state colony of the Netherlands East Indies until Japanese occupation in the Second World War. During the Indonesian National Revolution, the Dutch Captain 'Turk' Westerling led campaigns in which hundreds, maybe thousands died during the South Sulawesi Campaign. Following the transfer of sovereignty in December 1949, Sulawesi became part of the federal United States of Indonesia, which in 1950 became absorbed into the unitary Republic of Indonesia.

=== Picture gallery ===
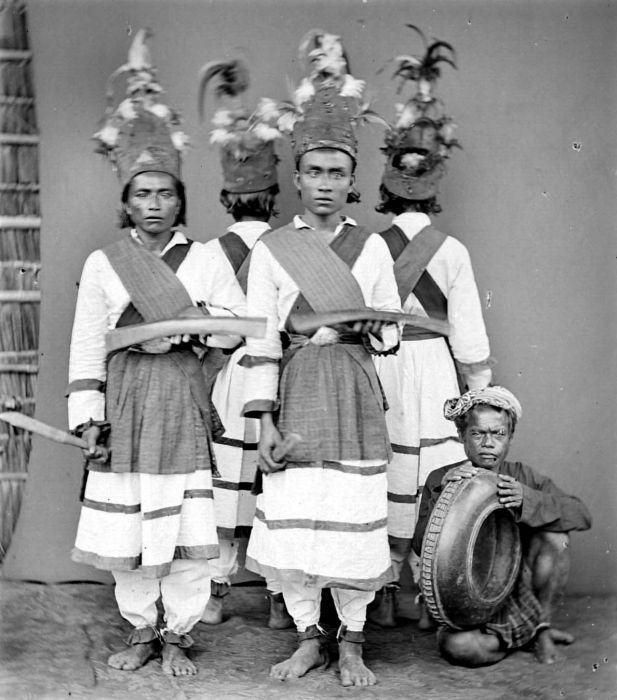
Tandako dancers and a musician in Pasere Maloku, Sulawesi.

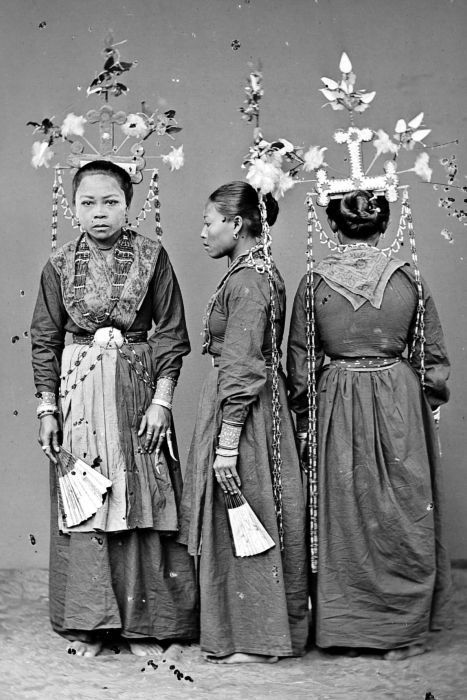
Tandako pajogé dancers from Pasere Maloku, Celebes (now Sulawesi)

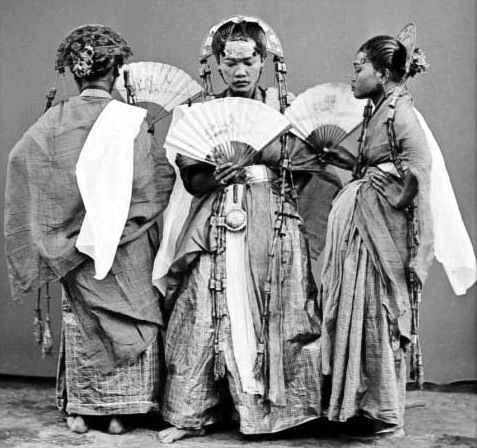
Padjogé dancers in Maros, Sulawesi, in the 1870s.

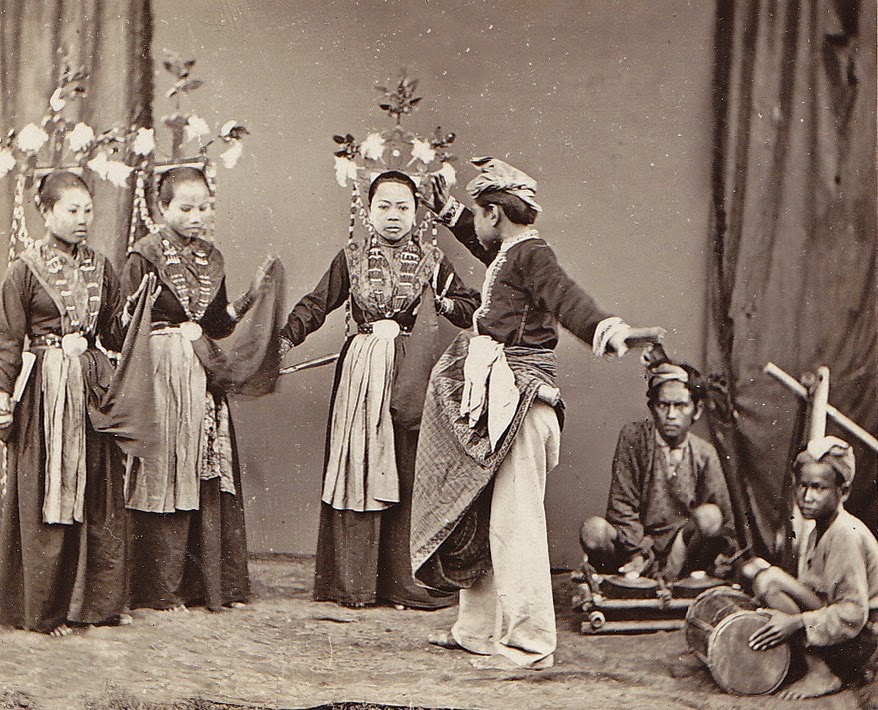
Tandako pajogé dancers and musicians in Gorontalo, North Celebes, circa 1870s.

=== Central Sulawesi ===
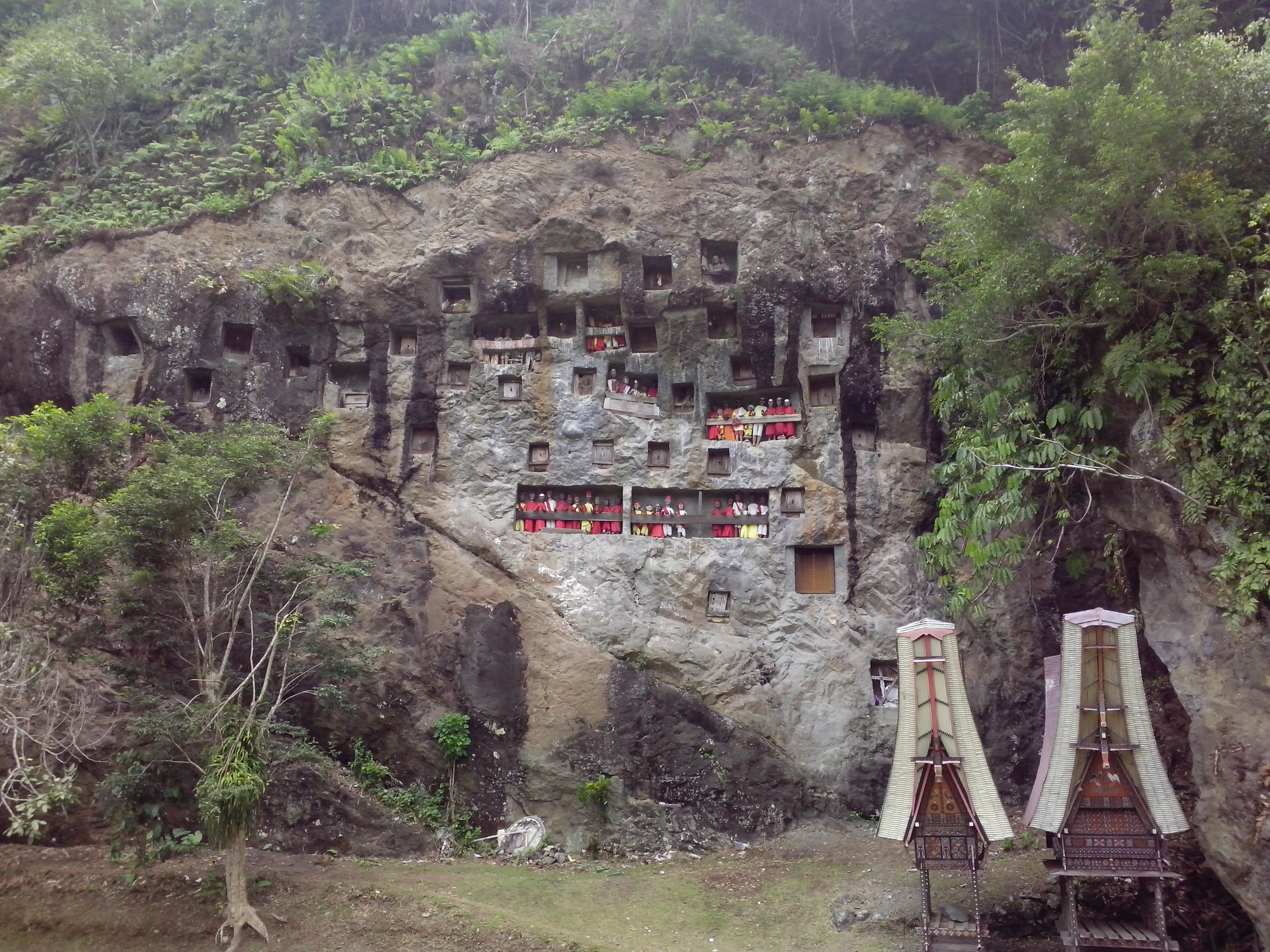
Toraja burial site. Tau-tau, the statue representing the buried people, can be seen in niches on the cliff.

The Portuguese were rumoured to have a fort in Parigi in 1555. The Kaili were an important group based in the Palu valley and related to the Toraja. Scholars relate that their control swayed under Ternate and Makassar, but this might have been a decision by the Dutch to give their vassals a chance to govern a difficult group. Padbruge commented that in the 1700s the Kaili population was larger and that it was a militarized society. In the 1850s, a civil war erupted between the Kaili groups, including the Banawa, in which the Dutch colonial government decided to intervene.

In the late 19th century, the Sarasins journeyed through the Palu valley as part of a major initiative to bring the Kaili under Dutch rule. Some interesting photographs were taken of shamans called Tadulako. Further Christian religious missions entered the area to make one of the most detailed ethnographic studies in the early 20th century. The Swede Walter Kaudern later studied much of the literature and produced a synthesis. Erskine Downs in the 1950s produced a summary of Kruyts and Andrianis work: "The religion of the Bare'e-Speaking Toradja of Central Celebes," which is invaluable for English-speaking researchers. One of the most recent publications is "When the bones are left," a study of the material culture of central Sulawesi, offering extensive analysis. Also worthy of study are the brilliant works of Monnig Atkinson on the Wana shamans who live in the Mori area.

== Population ==
Population of Sulawesi by province (2025 estimate)
1. South Sulawesi (45.4%)
2. Central Sulawesi (15.0%)
3. Southeast Sulawesi (13.5%)
4. North Sulawesi (12.9%)
5. West Sulawesi (7.29%)
6. Gorontalo (5.90%)

In Indonesia's 2000 census, the population of the provinces of Sulawesi was 14,946,488, or about 7.25% of the country's total population. By the 2010 Census, the total had reached 17,371,782, and the 2020 Census recorded a total of 19,896,951. The official estimate for mid 2025 was 21,054,875. The largest city on Sulawesi is Makassar.

=== Religion ===
Religions	Total
Islam	16,888,736
Protestant	3,126,786
Roman Catholic	331,646
Hinduism	267,059
Buddhism	30,412
Aliran Kepercayaan	12,584
Confucianism	523
Overall (2023)	20,657,746

Religion in Sulawesi (2023)
1. Islam (81.8%)
2. Protestantism (15.1%)
3. Catholic (1.61%)
4. Hinduism (1.29%)
5. Buddhism (0.15%)
6. Folk religion (0.06%)
7. Confucianism (0.00%)

Islam is the majority religion in Sulawesi. The conversion of the lowlands of the south western peninsula (South Sulawesi) to Islam occurred in the early 17th century. The kingdom of Luwu in the Gulf of Bone was the first to embrace Islam in February 1605; the Makassar kingdom of Gowa-Talloq, centred on the modern-day city of Makassar, followed suit in September. However, the Gorontalo and the Mongondow peoples of the northern peninsula largely converted to Islam only in the 19th century. Most Sulawesi Muslims are Sunnis.

Christians form a substantial minority on the island. According to the demographer Toby Alice Volkman, 17% of Sulawesi's population is Protestant and less than 2% is Catholic. Christians are concentrated on the tip of the northern peninsula around the city of Manado, which is inhabited by the Minahasa, a predominantly Protestant people, and the northernmost Sangir and Talaud Islands. The Toraja people of Tana Toraja in South Sulawesi have largely converted to Christianity since Indonesia's independence. There are also substantial numbers of Christians around Lake Poso in Central Sulawesi, among the Pamona speaking peoples of Central Sulawesi, and near Mamasa.

Though most people identify themselves as Muslims or Christians, they often subscribe to local beliefs and deities as well.

Smaller communities of Buddhists and Hindus are also found on Sulawesi, usually among the Chinese, Balinese, and Indian communities.

== Economy ==
The economy of Sulawesi is heavily centered around agriculture, fishing, mining, and forestry.

== Administration ==
The island was administered as one province between 1945 and 1960. In 1960 it was divided into two provinces – North and Central Sulawesi, and South and Southeast Sulawesi. In 1964 both of these were again divided, the former into North Sulawesi and Central Sulawesi, and the latter into South Sulawesi and Southeast Sulawesi. Today, it is subdivided into six provinces: Gorontalo, West Sulawesi, South Sulawesi, Central Sulawesi, Southeast Sulawesi, and North Sulawesi. Among these, the newest provinces are Gorontalo, established in 2000 from part of North Sulawesi, and West Sulawesi, established in 2004 from part of South Sulawesi.

The largest cities on the island are the provincial capitals of Makassar, Manado, Palu, Kendari, and Gorontalo (the provincial capital of West Sulawesi – the town of Mamuju – is not rated as a city); there are six other cities on Sulawesi – Bitung, Palopo, Bau-Bau, Parepare, Kotamobagu and Tomohun.

Province	Area in km^{2}	Population (2010 Census)	Population (2020 Census)	Population (mid 2025 estimate)	Density per km^{2} (mid 2025)
South Sulawesi	45,323.98	8,034,776	9,073,509	9,563,130	211.0
West Sulawesi	16,590.67	1,158,651	1,419,229	1,535,225	91.9
Southeast Sulawesi	36,139.30	2,232,586	2,624,875	2,836,740	78.5
Central Sulawesi	61,496.98	2,635,009	2,985,734	3,156,100	51.3
Gorontalo	12,024.98	1,040,164	1,171,681	1,242,240	103.3
North Sulawesi	14,488.43	2,270,596	2,621,923	2,721,440	187.8
Total Sulawesi	186,064.34	17,371,782	19,896,951	21,054,875	113.2

City	Province containing the city	Population (2010 Census)	Population (2020 Census)	Population (mid 2023 estimate)
Makassar	South Sulawesi	1,339,374	1,423,877	1,454,960
Manado	North Sulawesi	410,481	451,916	458,582
Palu	Central Sulawesi	336,532	373,218	387,493
Kendari	Southeast Sulawesi	289,966	345,107	351,095
Bitung	North Sulawesi	187,652	225,134	232,440
Gorontalo	Gorontalo	180,127	198,539	205,390
Palopo	South Sulawesi	147,932	184,681	192,760
Baubau	Southeast Sulawesi	136,991	159,248	161,280
Parepare	South Sulawesi	129,262	151,454	158,430
Kotamobagu	North Sulawesi	107,459	123,722	123,918
Tomohon	North Sulawesi	91,553	100,587	103,072

== Flora and fauna ==
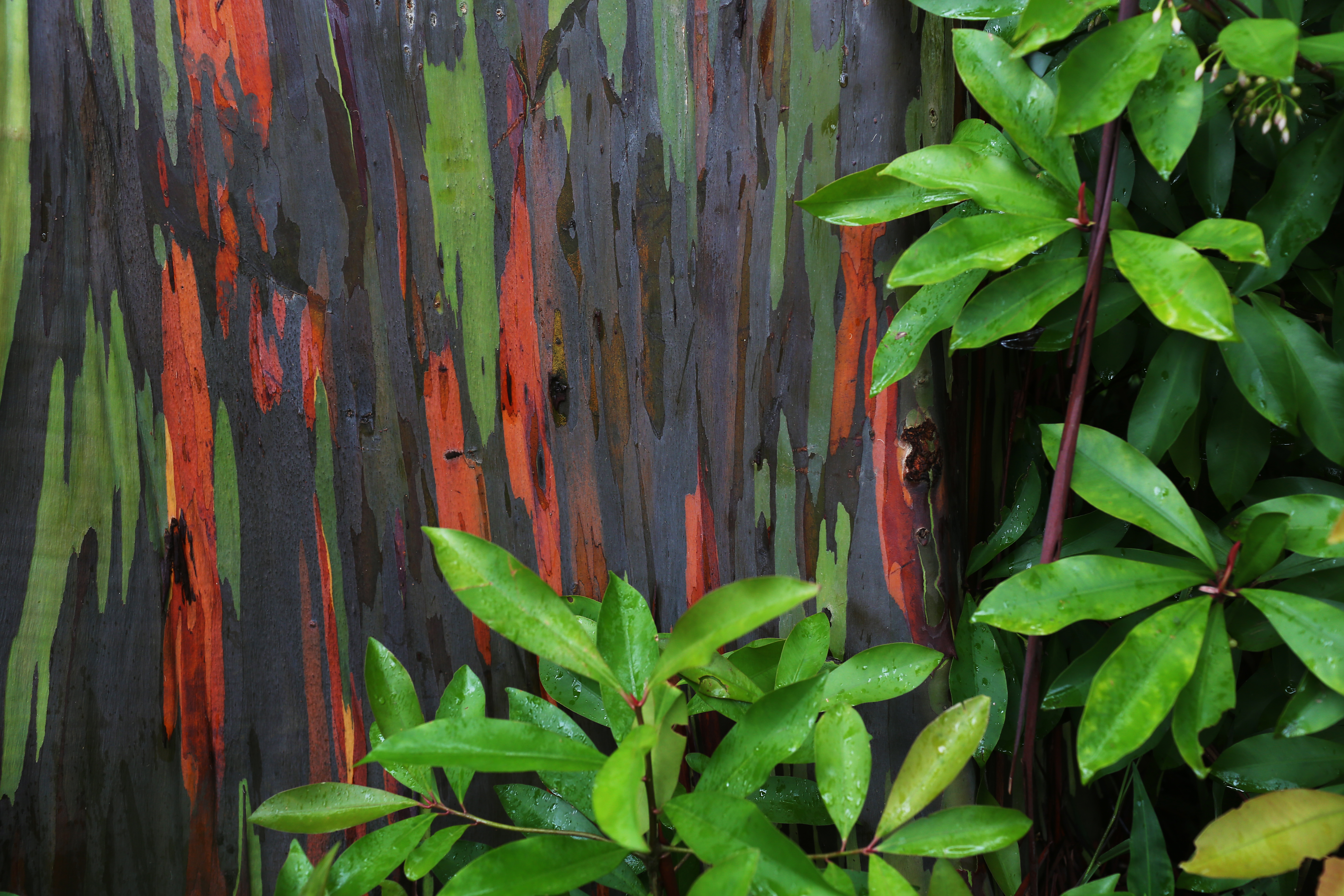
The colorful bark of Eucalyptus deglupta

Sulawesi is part of Wallacea, meaning that it has a mix of both Indomalayan and Australasian species that reached the island by crossing deep-water oceanic barriers. The flora includes one native eucalypt, E. deglupta. There are 8 national parks on the island, of which 4 are mostly marine. The parks with the largest terrestrial area are Bogani Nani Wartabone with 2,871 km^{2} and Lore Lindu National Park with 2,290 km^{2}. Bunaken National Park, which protects a rich coral ecosystem, has been proposed as a UNESCO World Heritage Site. The coast of northern tip of Sulawesi is identified as a site of highest marine biodiversity importance in the Coral Triangle.

=== Mammals ===
Early in the Pleistocene, Sulawesi had a dwarf elephant and a dwarf form of Stegodon, (an elephant relative, S. sompoensis); later both were replaced by larger forms. A giant suid, Celebochoerus, was also formerly present. It is thought that many of the migrants to Sulawesi arrived via the Philippines, while Sulawesi in turn served as a way station for migrants to Flores. A Pleistocene faunal turnover is recognized, with the competitive displacement of several indigenous tarsiers by more recently arriving ones and of Celebochoerus by other medium-sized herbivores like the babirusa, anoa and Celebes warty pig.

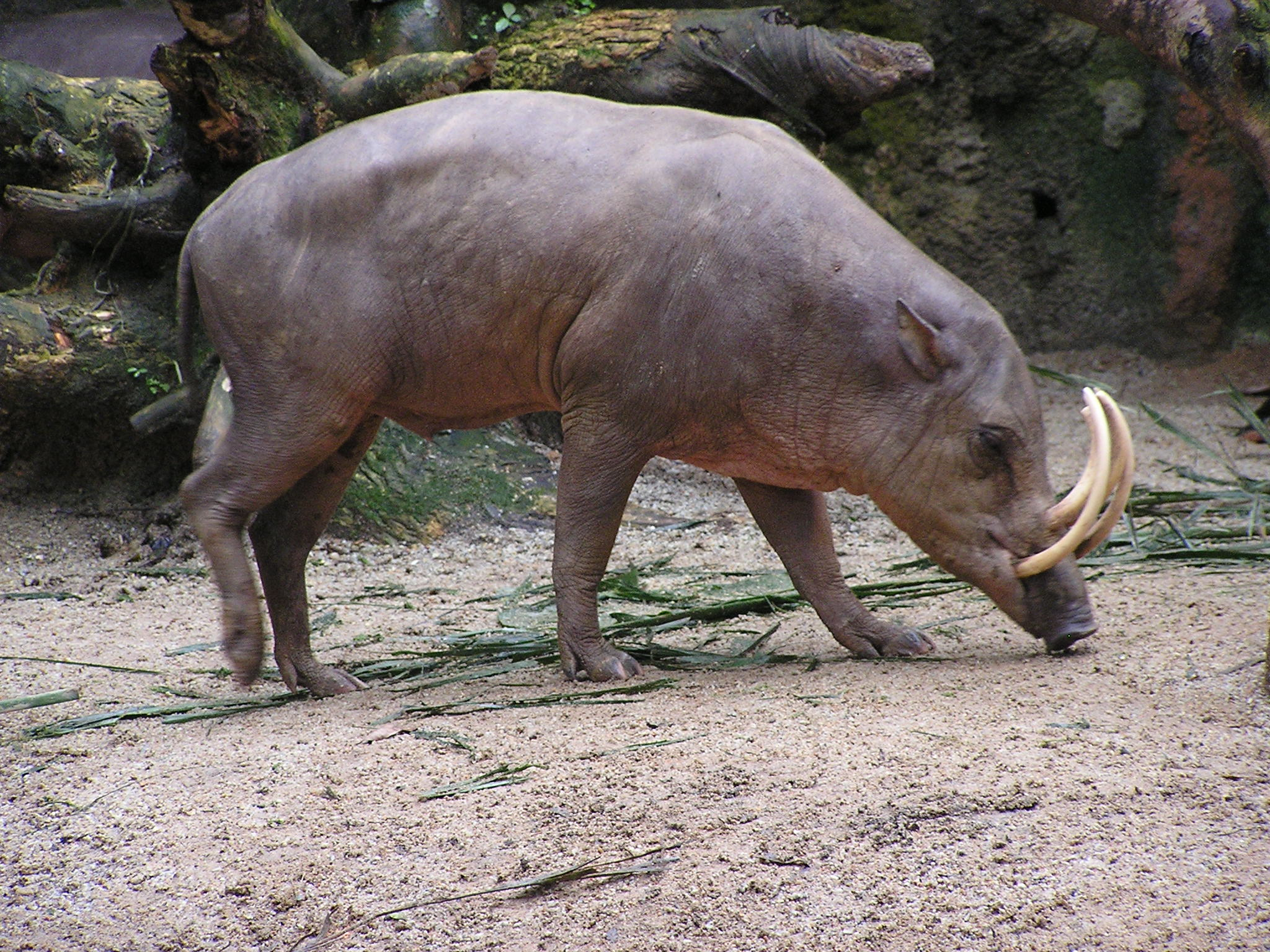
The north Sulawesi babirusa is endemic to Sulawesi.

There are 127 known extant native mammalian species in Sulawesi. A large percentage, 62% (79 species) are endemic, meaning that they are found nowhere else in the world. The largest of these are the two species of anoa or dwarf buffalo. Other artiodactyl species inhabiting Sulawesi are the warty pig and the babirusas, which are aberrant pigs. The only native carnivoran is the Sulawesi palm civet (Asian palm and Malayan civets have been introduced). Primates present include a number of nocturnal tarsiers (T. fuscus, Dian's, Gursky's, Jatna's, Wallace's, the Lariang and pygmy tarsiers) as well as diurnal macaques (Heck's, the booted, crested black, Gorontalo, moor, and Tonkean macaques). While most of Sulawesi's mammals are placental and have Asian relatives, several species of cuscus, arboreal marsupials of Australasian origin, are also present (Sulawesi bear cuscus and Sulawesi dwarf cuscus, which are diurnal and nocturnal, respectively).

Sulawesi is home to a large number of endemic rodent genera. Murid rodent genera endemic to Sulawesi and immediately adjacent islands (such as the Togian Islands, Buton Island, and Muna Island) are Bunomys, Echiothrix, Margaretamys, Taeromys and Tateomys as well as the single-species genera Eropeplus, Hyorhinomys, Melasmothrix, Paucidentomys, Paruromys, Sommeromys and the semiaquatic Waiomys. All nine sciurids are from three endemic genera, Hyosciurus, Prosciurillus and Rubrisciurus.

While over 20 bat species are present on Sulawesi, only a portion of these are endemic: Rhinolophus tatar, Scotophilus celebensis and the megabats Acerodon celebensis, Boneia bidens, Dobsonia exoleta, Harpyionycteris celebensis, Neopteryx frosti, Rousettus celebensis and Styloctenium wallacei.

Several endemic shrews, the Sulawesi shrew, Sulawesi tiny shrew and the Sulawesi white-handed shrew, are found on the island.

Sulawesi has no gliding mammals, being situated between Borneo with its colugos and flying squirrels, and Halmahera with its sugar gliders.

=== Birds ===
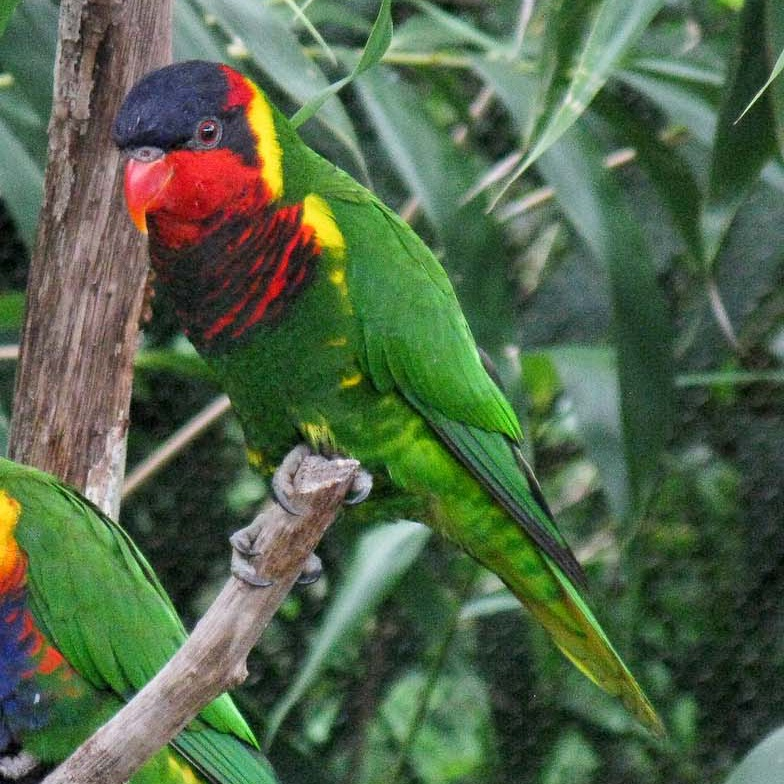
The endemic ornate lorikeet

By contrast, Sulawesian bird species tend to be found on other nearby islands as well, such as Borneo; 31% of Sulawesi's birds are found nowhere else. One endemic (also found on small neighboring islands) is the largely ground-dwelling, chicken-sized maleo, a megapode which sometimes uses hot sand close to the island's volcanic vents to incubate its eggs. An international partnership of conservationists, donors, and local people have formed the Alliance for Tompotika Conservation, in an effort to raise awareness and protect the nesting grounds of these birds on the central-eastern arm of the island. Other endemic birds include the flightless snoring rail, the fiery-browed starling, the Sulawesi masked owl, the Sulawesi myna, the satanic nightjar and the grosbeak starling. There are around 350 known bird species in Sulawesi.

=== Reptiles ===
The larger reptiles of Sulawesi are not endemic and include reticulated and Burmese pythons, the Pacific ground boa, king cobras, water monitors, sailfin lizards, saltwater crocodiles and green sea turtles. An extinct giant tortoise, Megalochelys atlas, was formerly present, but disappeared by 840,000 years ago, possibly because of the arrival of Homo erectus. Similarly, komodo dragons or similar lizards appear to have inhabited the island, being among its apex predators. The smaller snakes of Sulawesi include nonendemic forms such as the gliding species Chrysopelea paradisi and endemic forms such as Calamaria boesemani, Calamaria muelleri, Calamaria nuchalis, Cyclotyphlops, Enhydris matannensis, Ptyas dipsas, Rabdion grovesi, Tropidolaemus laticinctus and Typhlops conradi. Similarly, the smaller lizards of Sulawesi include nonendemic species such as Bronchocela jubata, Dibamus novaeguineae and Gekko smithii, as well as endemic species such as Lipinia infralineolata and Gekko iskandari.

Sulawesi also harbours several species of freshwater chelonians, two of which are endemic. They include the Forsten's tortoise and the Sulawesi forest turtle, both of which likely attribute their respective origins to the dispersal of the mainland Asian elongated tortoise and Malayan flat-shelled turtle from the then-exposed subcontinent of Sundaland during the Pleistocene epoch.

The remaining two species consist of the non-endemic Malayan box turtle of the Wallacean subspecies, and the Asiatic softshell turtle.

=== Amphibians ===
The amphibians of Sulawesi include the endemic frogs Hylarana celebensis, H. macrops, H. mocquardi, Ingerophrynus celebensis, Limnonectes arathooni, L. larvaepartus, L. microtympanum, Occidozyga celebensis, O. semipalmata and O. tompotika as well as the endemic "flying frogs" Rhacophorus edentulus and R. georgii.

=== Freshwater fish ===
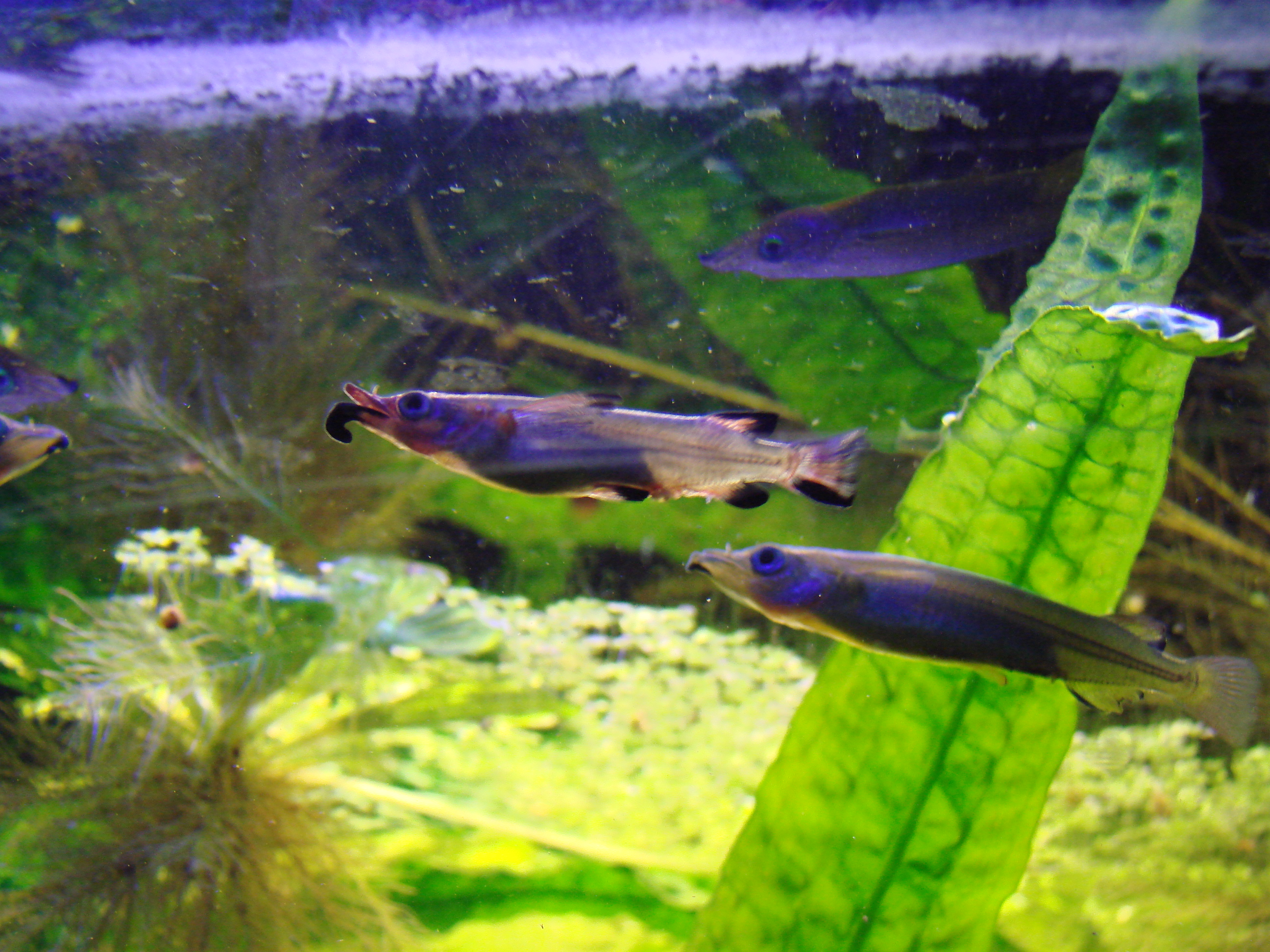
15 species of viviparous halfbeaks are endemic to Sulawesi, including 12 Nomorhamphus (depicted), Dermogenys orientalis, D. vogti, and Tondanichthys kottelati.

Sulawesi is home to more than 70 freshwater fish species, including more than 55 endemics. Among these are the genus Nomorhamphus, a species flock of viviparous halfbeaks containing 12 species that only are found on Sulawesi (others are from the Philippines). In addition to Nomorhamphus, the majority of Sulawesi's freshwater fish species are ricefishes, gobies (Glossogobius and Mugilogobius) and Telmatherinid sail-fin silversides. The last family is almost entirely restricted to Sulawesi, especially the Malili Lake system, consisting of Matano and Towuti, and the small Lontoa (Wawantoa), Mahalona and Masapi. Another unusual endemic is Lagusia micracanthus from rivers in South Sulawesi, which is the sole member of its genus and among the smallest grunters. The gudgeon Bostrychus microphthalmus from the Maros Karst is the only described species of cave-adapted fish from Sulawesi, but an apparently undescribed species from the same region and genus also exists.

=== Freshwater crustaceans and snails ===
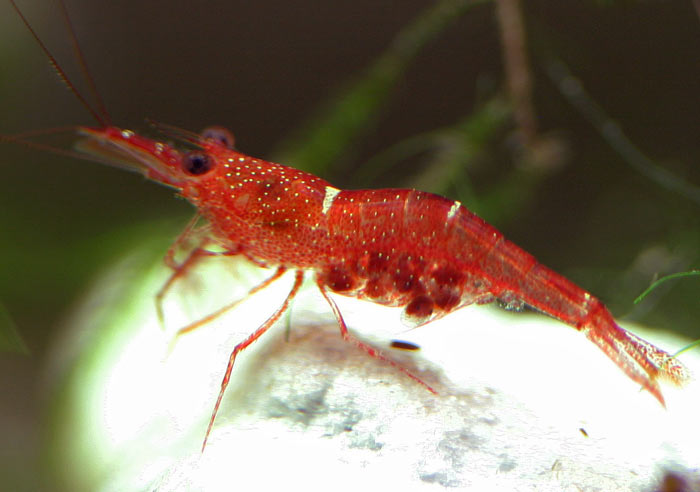
Orange delight shrimp (Caridina loehae) from Sulawesi.

Many species of Caridina freshwater shrimp and parathelphusid freshwater crabs (Migmathelphusa, Nautilothelphusa, Parathelphusa, Sundathelphusa and Syntripsa) are endemic to Sulawesi. Several of these species have become very popular in the aquarium hobby, and since most are restricted to a single lake system, they are potentially vulnerable to habitat loss and overexploitation. There are also several endemic cave-adapted shrimp and crabs, especially in the Maros Karst. This includes Cancrocaeca xenomorpha, which has been called the "most highly cave-adapted species of crab known in the world".

The genus Tylomelania of freshwater snails is also endemic to Sulawesi, with the majority of the species restricted to Lake Poso and the Malili Lake system.

=== Insects ===
The Trigonopterus selayarensis is a flightless weevil endemic to Sulawesi.

=== Miscellaneous ===
The Indonesian coelacanth and the mimic octopus are present in the waters off Sulawesi's coast.

=== Conservation ===
Sulawesi island was the subject of an Ecoregional Conservation Assessment in 2005, coordinated by The Nature Conservancy. Detailed reports about the vegetation of the island are available. The assessment produced a detailed and annotated list of 'conservation portfolio' sites. This information was widely distributed to local government agencies and nongovernmental organizations. Detailed conservation priorities have also been outlined in a recent publication.

The lowland forests on the island have mostly been removed. Because of the relative geological youth of the island and its dramatic and sharp topography, the lowland areas are naturally limited in their extent. The past decade has seen dramatic conversion of this rare and endangered habitat. The island also possesses one of the largest outcrops of serpentine soil in the world, which support an unusual and large community of specialized plant species. Overall, the flora and fauna of this unique center of global biodiversity is very poorly documented and understood and remains critically threatened.

The islands of Pepaya, Mas, and Raja islands, located in Sumalata Village – North Gorontalo Regency (about 30 km from Saronde Island), have been named a nature reserve since the Dutch colonial time in 1936. Four of the only seven species of sea turtles can be found in the islands, the world's best turtle habitat. They include penyu hijau (Chelonia midas), penyu sisik (Eretmochelys imbricata), penyu tempayan (Caretta caretta) and penyu belimbing (Dermochelys coriacea). In 2011, the habitat was threatened by human activities such as illegal poaching and fish bombing activities; furthermore, many coral reefs, which represent a source of food for turtles, have been damaged.

== Environment ==
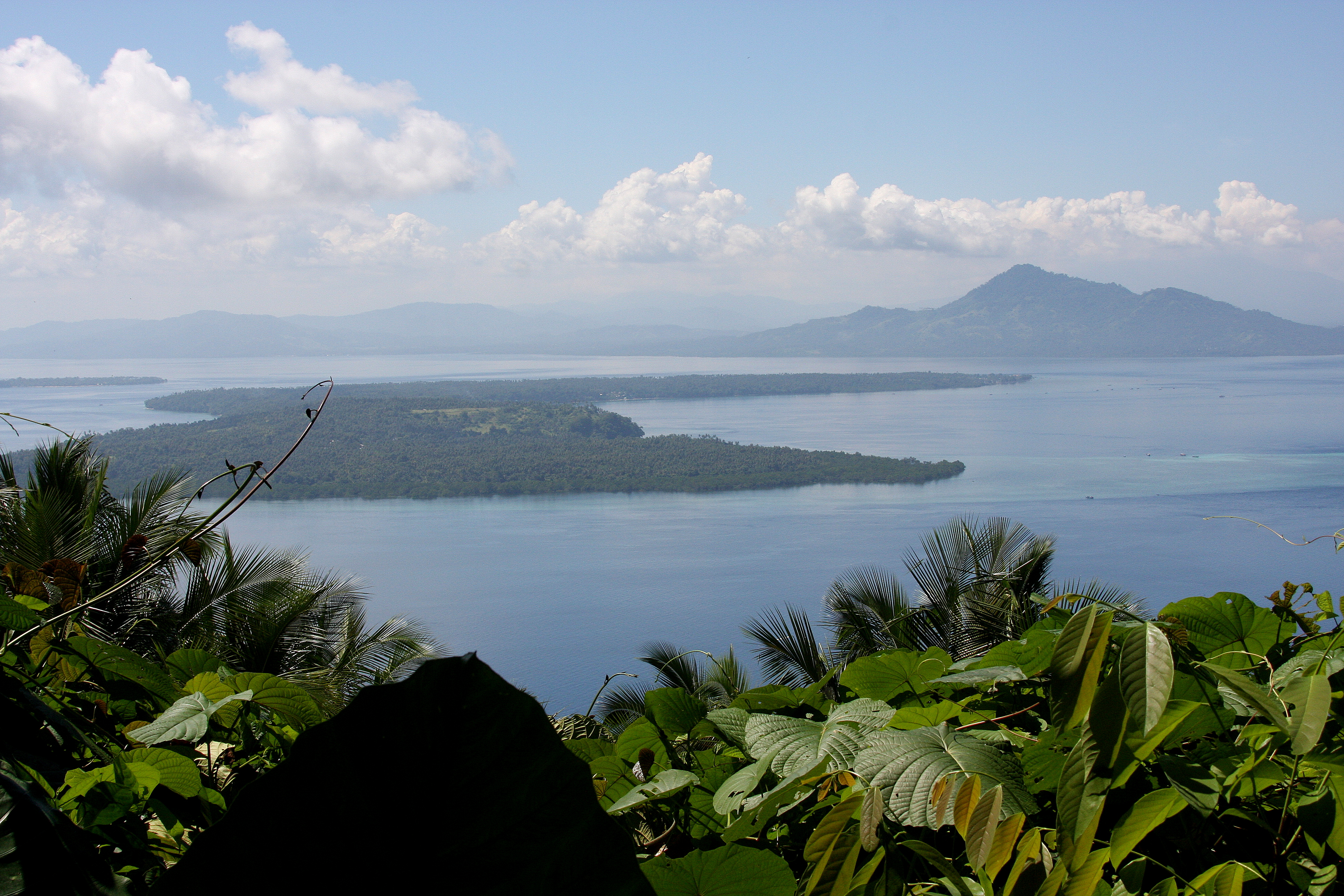
Bunaken Island seen from Manado Tua island.

The largest environmental issue in Sulawesi is deforestation. In 2007, scientists found that 80 percent of Sulawesi's forest had been lost or degraded, especially centered in the lowlands and the mangroves. Forests have been felled for logging, large agricultural projects, and, increasingly, nickel mining. Loss of forest has resulted in many of Sulawesi's endemic species becoming endangered. In addition, 99 percent of Sulawesi's wetlands have been lost or damaged.

Other environmental threats included bushmeat hunting and mining.

=== Parks ===
The island of Sulawesi has six national parks and nineteen nature reserves. In addition, Sulawesi has three marine protected areas. Many of Sulawesi's parks are threatened by logging, mining, and deforestation for agriculture.

== See also ==
- List of islands of Indonesia
- Celebes Sea
- HMS Celebes (1806)
- 2009 Sulawesi superbolide

== General sources ==
- Limits of Oceans and Seas, 3rd ed. (PDF), International Hydrographic Organization, 1953, archived from the original (PDF) on 5 October 2018.
- Von Rintelen, T.; et al. (2014), "A Snail Perspective on the Biogeography of Sulawesi, Indonesia: Origin and Intra-Island Dispersal of the Viviparous Freshwater Gastropod Tylomelania", PLOS ONE, 9 (6) e98917, Bibcode:2014PLoSO...998917V, doi:10.1371/journal.pone.0098917, PMC 4090239, PMID 24971564.
