= South Peninsula =

Semenanjung Selatan
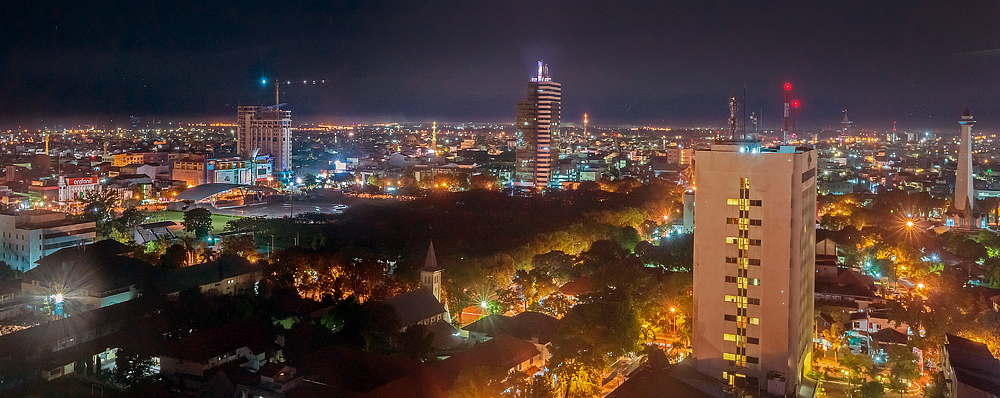
- Makassar, the largest city on the South Peninsula

- Location within Sulawesi

Geography
- Location: Sulawesi
- Coordinates: 5°S 120°E
- Adjacent to: Flores Sea; Java Sea; Gulf of Bone; Makassar Strait
- Highest elevation: 3,478 m (11411 ft)
- Highest point: Mount Latimojong

Administration
- Indonesia
- Province: South Sulawesi
- Largest settlement: Makassar

Demographics
- Population: 8.8 million

The South Peninsula is one of the four principal peninsulas on the island of Sulawesi, stretching south from the central part of the island. It is part of the province of South Sulawesi. The southern peninsula is the most densely populated peninsula in Sulawesi; over 45% of the population of Sulawesi (or 8.8 million people) are on the southern peninsula. Inhabited by an Austronesian people who came thousands of years ago. The largest ethnic group in Sulawesi is the Bugis, followed by Makassar and Toraja.

Mount Lompobattang lies near the southern tip of this peninsula. and the latimojong mountain is the highest mountain in the southern peninsula of sulawesi and on the island of sulawesi.

== History ==
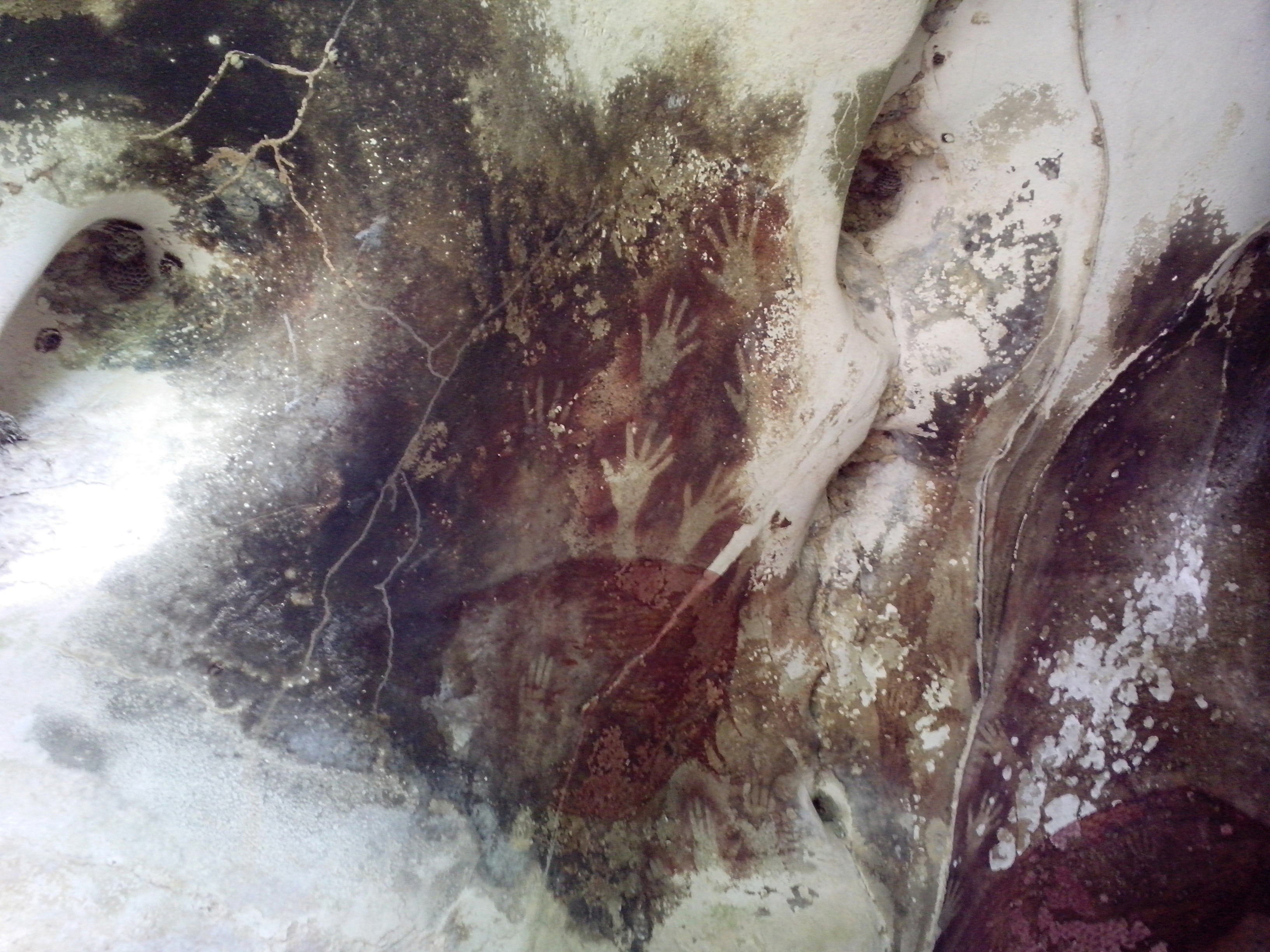
Hand prints in Pettakere Cave at Leang-Leang Prehistoric Site, Maros.

South Peninsula was first inhabited by humans about 30,000 years ago. The archaeological remains of the earliest inhabitants were discovered in caves near limestone hills around Maros, about 30 km northeast of Makassar, the capital of the South Sulawesi province. Pebble and flake stone tools have been collected from the river terraces in the valley of Walanae, among Soppeng and Sengkang, including the bones from giant pig and elephant species that are now extinct. Hand print paintings, estimated to be around 35,000 to 40,000 years old, have been found in the Pettakere cave, located 12 kilometres (7.5 mi) from the town of Maros and 30 kilometres (19 mi) from Makassar.

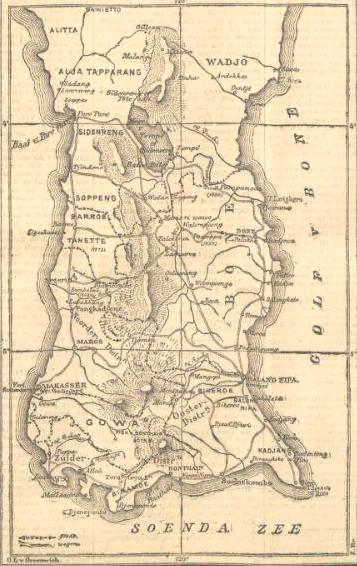
South Peninsula Map 1905

During the golden era of the spice trade, from the 15th to 19th centuries, South Sulawesi served as the gateway to the Maluku Islands.

At around the 14th century in South Sulawesi there were a number of small kingdoms, including two prominent ones, the Kingdom of Gowa near Makassar and the Bugis kingdom located in Bone. In 1530, the kingdom of Gowa began development and in the mid 16th century, Gowa become one of the most important trade centers in eastern Indonesia. In 1605, the King of Gowa embraced Islam and made the kingdom of Gowa Islamist and between the years 1608 and 1611, the Kingdom of Gowa conquered the kingdom of Bugis so that Islam could be spread to the regions of Makassar and Bone.
