= Mentawai Strait =

- Selat Mentawai (Indonesian)
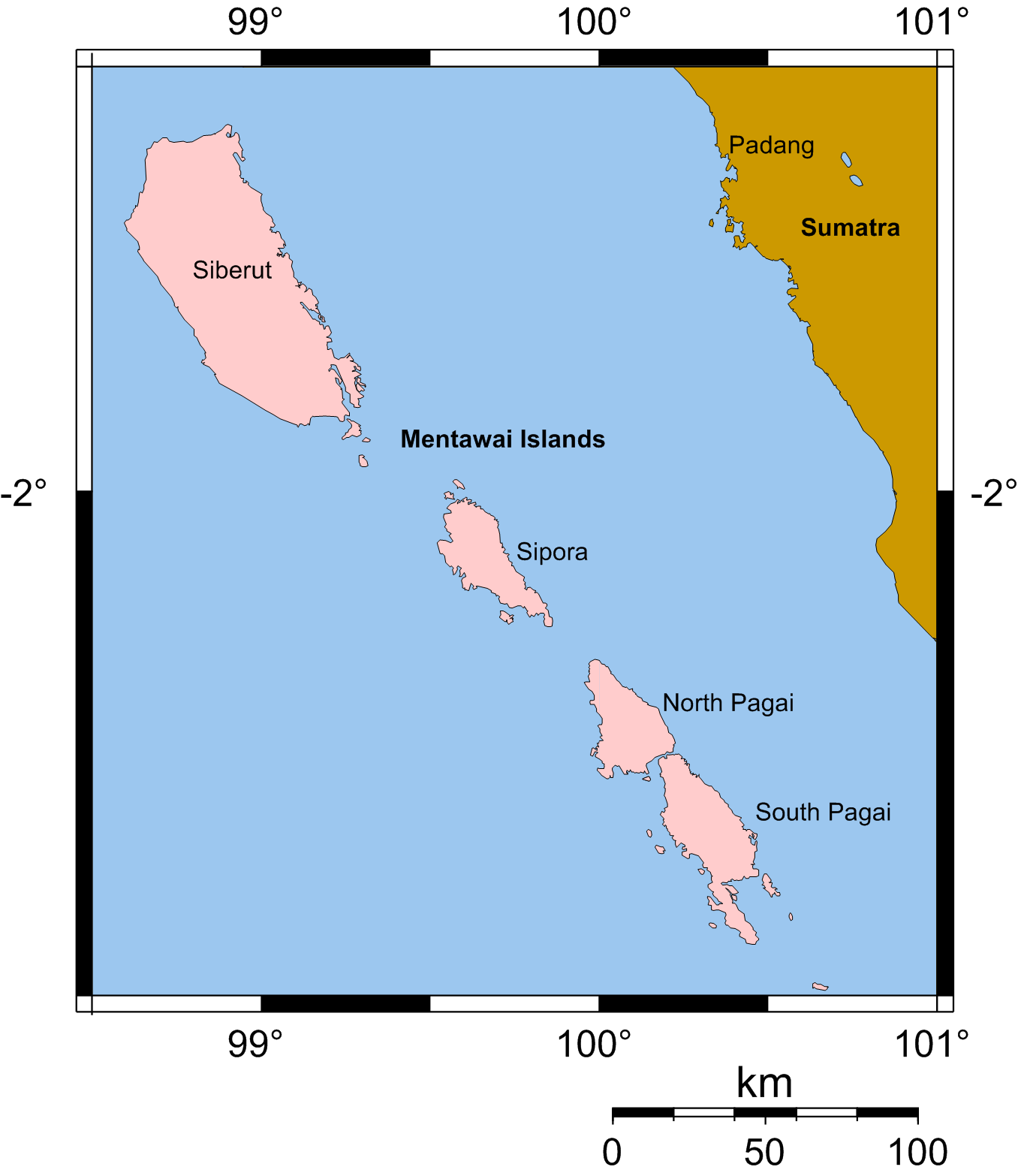
- Mentawai Strait

- Location within Sumatra
- Coordinates: 1°45′00″S 100°0′0″E
- Type: strait
- Basin countries: Indonesia
- Max. length: 450 kilometres (280 mi)
- Max. width: 150 kilometres (93 mi)
- Min. width: 100 kilometres (62 mi)
- Settlements: Padang
- References: Selat Mentawai: Indonesia National Geospatial-Intelligence Agency, Bethesda, MD, USA

Mentawai Strait separates the island of Sumatra from the small archipelago of the Mentawai Islands, Indonesia. Its waters belong to the Indian Ocean and both banks are part of the province of West Sumatra.

The strait is about 450 km long and its width varies between 100 and 150 km. The main city on the edge of the strait is the capital of West Sumatra, Padang.

The strait is in major fault zone and several earthquakes have been located in it, being the most known those of 1833 Sumatra earthquake and that of 2009 Sumatra earthquake.

The Sumatran Fault Zone is a highly active fault with slip rates ranging from 10 to 27 mm/yr. Historical earthquake records suggest that fault stepovers constrained past fault ruptures.

The Mentawai segment is also still carrying the potential to produce earthquakes in the near future, probably within the next several decades.

== See also ==
- Mentawai Islands Regency
