= Gulf of Tomini =

Body of water in Sulawesi, Indonesia

- also known as the Bay of Tomini
- Teluk Tomini (Indonesian)
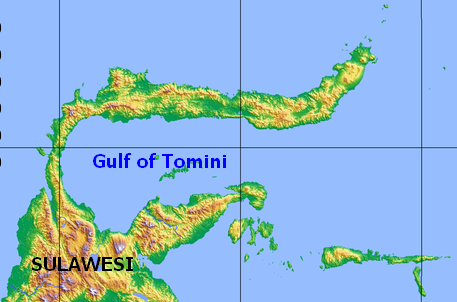
- The gulf of Tomini lies in the north-eastern part of Sulawesi.

- Location within Sulawesi
- Location: Southeast Asia
- Coordinates: 0°0′00″N 121°0′00″E
- Type: Bay
- Basin countries: Indonesia
- Settlements: Gorontalo, Poso

The Gulf of Tomini (Indonesian: Teluk Tomini), also known as the Bay of Tomini, is the equatorial gulf which separates the Minahassa (Northern) and East Peninsulas of the island of Sulawesi (Celebes) in Indonesia. The Togian Islands lie near its center. To the east, the Gulf opens onto the Molucca Sea.

== Extent ==
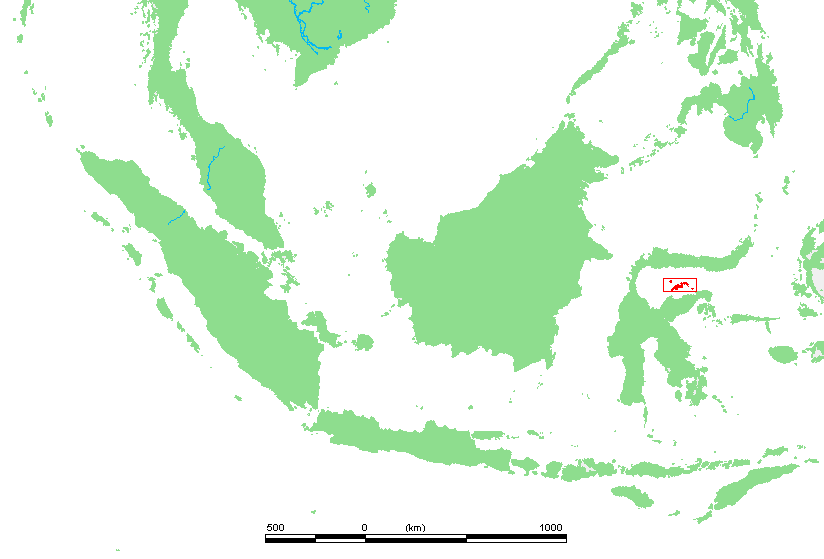
Map showing the Togian Islands highlighted in the Gulf of Tomini.

The International Hydrographic Organization (IHO) defines the Gulf of Tomini as being one of the divisions of the East Indian Archipelago. It is defined as the waters west of the "Western limit of the Molukka Sea", which is elsewhere defined as the line running from "Tg. Pasir Pandjang (0°39′S 123°25′E)... across to Tg. Tombalilatoe (123° 21′ E) on the opposite coast".
