= Molucca Sea =

Marginal sea in the Pacific Ocean near Indonesia

- Laut Maluku
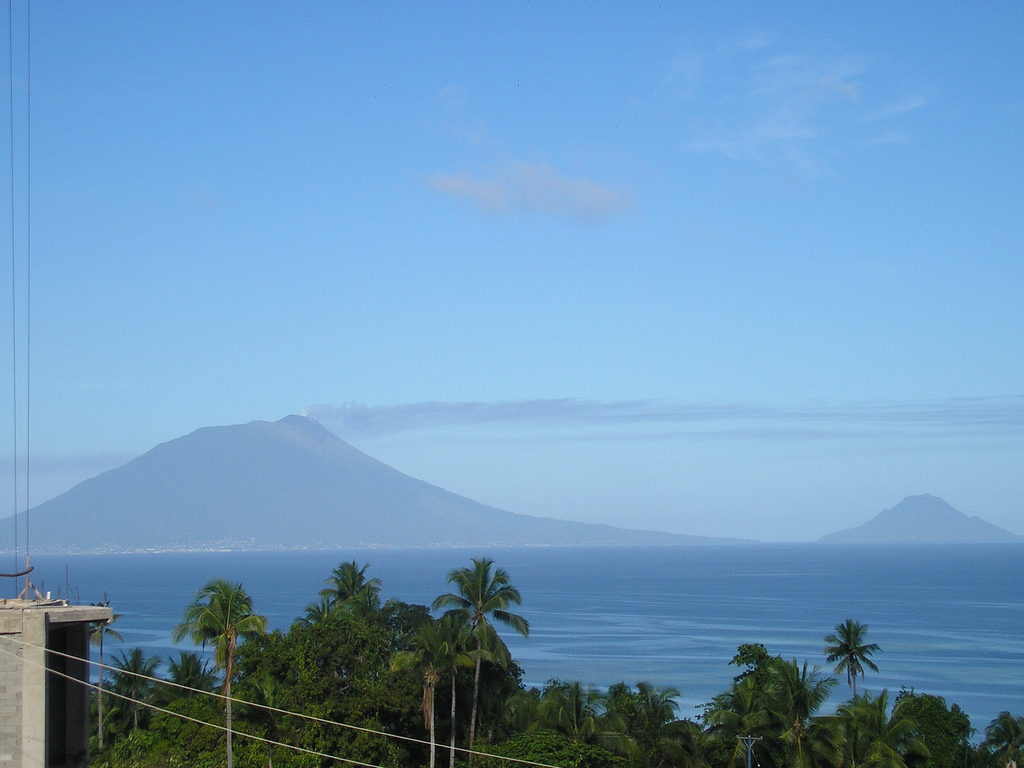
- Ternate island on the Molucca Sea

- Location within Indonesia

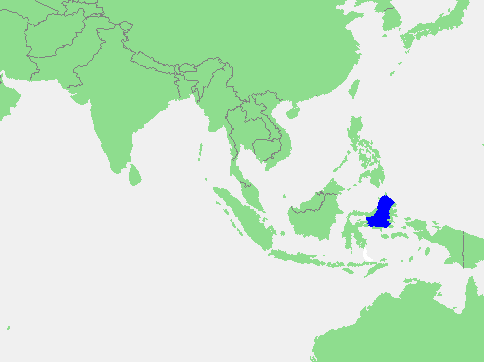
- Location of the Molucca Sea within Southeast Asia
- Location: Southeast Asia
- Coordinates: 0°25′S 125°25′E
- Type: Sea
- Part of: Pacific Ocean
- Basin countries: Indonesia
- Surface area: 200,000 km^{2} (77,000 sq mi)
- Max. depth: 4,810 m (15,781 ft)
- Settlements: Bitung, Ternate City, Tidore City

The Molucca Sea (Indonesian: Laut Maluku; Indonesian pronunciation: [ˌlaʊt̪̚ maˈluku]) is located in the western Pacific Ocean, bordered by the Indonesian Islands of Celebes (Sulawesi) to the west, Halmahera to the east, and the Sula Islands to the south. It has a total surface area of 77,000 square miles (200,000 square kilometres), divided into three basins, and functions to transport water from the Pacific Ocean to the shallower seas surrounding it. The deepest basin is the 15,780-foot (4,810-meter) Batjan (Indonesian: Bacan) basin.

The sea known for periodic earthquakes, stemming from the sea overlying a microplate, the Molucca Sea Plate, which is being subducted in two opposite directions: one in the direction of the Eurasian Plate to the west and the other in the direction of the Philippine Sea Plate to the east.

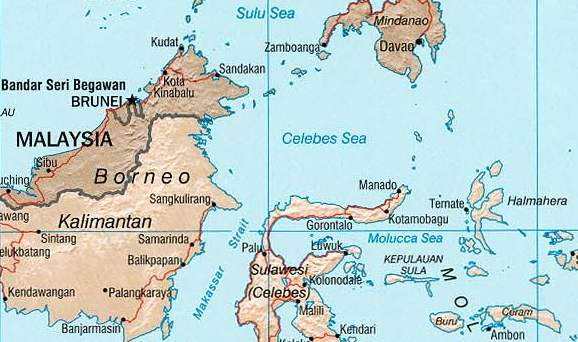
Celebes Sea, with the Molucca Sea to the southeast

The Molucca Sea is rich in coral and has many diving sites due to the depth of its waters.

== Location ==
The Molucca Sea borders the Banda Sea to the south and the Celebes Sea to the west. To the north is the Philippine Sea and to the east is the Halmahera Sea.

The islands bordering the Molucca Sea include Halmahera to the north east, Taliabu and Mangole in the centre, and Sulawesi to the west. The Talaud Islands to the north are considered to be the northern border of the sea, though the Molucca Sea Plate, the tectonic plate named after the sea, extends further north.

The International Hydrographic Organization (IHO) defines the "Molukka Sea" [sic] as being one of the waters of the East Indian Archipelago. The IHO defines its limits as follows:

On the North. By a line from the Northeast extreme of Celebes [Sulawesi] through the Siau Islands to the South point of Sangi (3°21′N 125°37′E) thence to the Southern extreme of the Talaud Group, through these islands to their Northeastern extreme (4°29′N 126°52′E) and thence a line to Tanjong Sopi, the Northern point of Morotai Island.

On the East. By the West coast of Morotai from Tanjong Sopi as far south as Wajaboela (2°17′N 128°12′E), thence a line to the Northern point of Halmahera and down its West coast to Tanjong Libolo, its Southern extreme.

On the South. A line from the Southern extreme of Halmahera to the North point of Bisa (Setile) Island, thence to the Northern extreme of Obi Major, through this island to Tanjong Ake Lamo, its Southwestern point, thence to Tanjong Dehekolano, the Eastern extremity of the Soela [Sula] Islands, along their Northern coasts to Tanjong Marikasoe, the Western extreme, thence a line to the Southeast point of Banggai Island (1°43′S 123°36′E).

On the West. The East coasts of Banggai and Peleng Islands to North Bangkalan (1°10′S 123°18′E) thence a line to Tg. Botok (Celebes) (1°04′S 123°19′E) round the coast to Tg. Pasir Pandjang (0°39′S 123°25′E) and across to Tg. Tombalilatoe (0°18′24″N 123°20′44″E) on the opposite coast, thence up the East coast to Tg. Poeisan, the Northeastern extreme of Celebes.

== History ==
The Portuguese, Dutch, British, and Spanish Empires fought each other for control of the spice islands that can only be accessed through the Molucca Sea.

== Earthquakes ==
January 6, 2019, measuring 7.0, with no tsunamis resulting.

The sea is a very seismically active area due to the Molucca Sea Plate.
