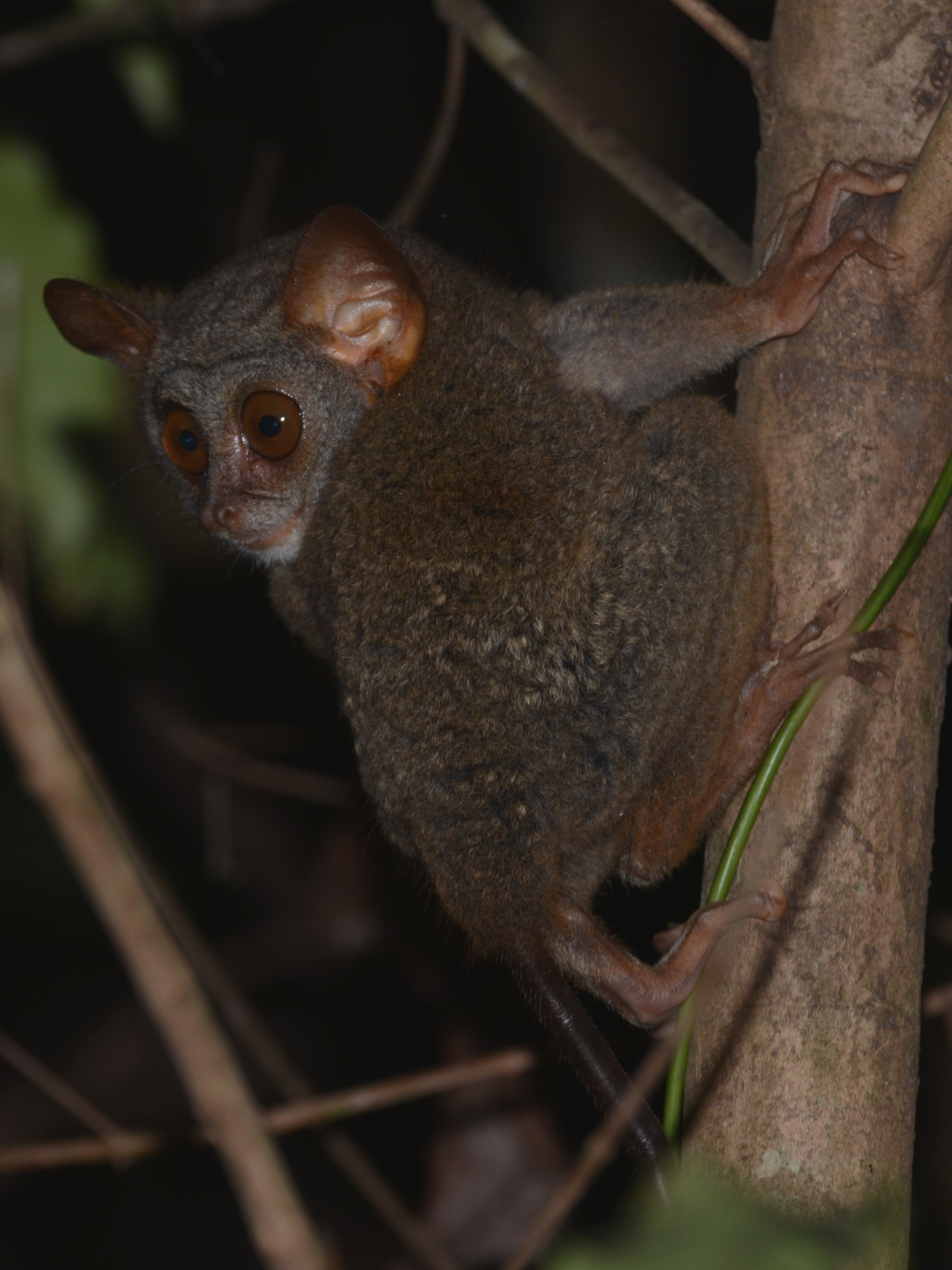

Conservation status
- Critically Endangered (IUCN 3.1)

Scientific classification
- Kingdom: Animalia
- Phylum: Chordata
- Class: Mammalia
- Infraclass: Placentalia
- Order: Primates
- Family: Tarsiidae
- Genus: Tarsius
- Species: T. tumpara

Binomial name
- Tarsius tumpara Shekelle, Groves, Merker, J. Supriatna. (2008)

= Siau Island tarsier =

Species of primate

The Siau Island tarsier (Tarsius tumpara) is a species of tarsier from the tiny volcanic island of Siau in Indonesia. The T. tumpara species is one of 14 species and 7 subspecies in the tarsier family called "Tarsiidae". They belong to the Haplorrhini suborder, known as the "dry-nosed" primates. The tarsier's eyes are so big that they do not move in its socket and they are almost as big as its brain. Locally in the Siau dialect of Sangir language, the tarsiers are called Tumpara. The name differs from the Sangihe dialect which called tarsiers, Senggasi or Higo, these names are used for the Sangihe tarsier instead.

== Characteristics ==
=== Anatomy and physical appearance ===
The main characteristics of the tumpara tarsiers include having a white ventral fur, lacking the distinctive golden dorsal fur of the Tarsius sangirensis, and having a larger skull compared to its other relatives. Another way to distinguish the T. tumpara from other tarsier species such as T. sangirensis and T. dianae is its distinctive duet note in the different sexes. The Siau Island tarsier is a very small species which measures around 4 to 6 inches (10–15 cm) in body length. Their long tails can add another 8 inches (20 cm) to their total length. They weigh between 100 and 150 grams, which makes them very quiet when they leap on dense vines or branches.

==== Eyes ====
The Siau Island tarsier has very big eyes that do not move, and have very big irises that range in shades of gold and brown. The size of its eyes helps the species with nocturnal vision. They have foveal vision, which helps them to see things more sharply. However, they lack a tapetum (which is very common in mammals).

==== Agility ====
Siau Island tarsiers are an arboreal species, which means they spend most of their time in trees, and therefore are very agile and excellent at jumping and climbing. They can jump up to 10 ft (3 m) high, have a neck that turns 180 degrees, and have good hearing. They also have long thin fingers which helps them to grab things such as when they are capturing prey. The T. tumpara's main method of hunting consists of sitting quietly on a branch and waiting for a prey to arrive to attack it.

==== Reproduction ====
Siau Island tarsiers can reach sexual maturity at two years old, this means that they carry and give birth to an offspring. Pregnancy lasts around six months and the mother gives birth to a single offspring.

==== Nutrition ====
They are a carnivorous species that feed on small animals such as frogs, lizards and small birds, but mostly eat insects like spiders. They have a very wide mouth, strong jaw and sharp teeth which help them feed off small animals.

== Geography ==
Tarsiers are found in Southeast Asia, though the T. tumpara is endemic to Siau Island, Indonesia. This species was located geographically using GIS and geographic profiling and they have found that they live in a small range of 125 km^{2} (48 sq mi), with an even smaller occupancy range of approximately 19.4 km^{2} (7.5 sq mi). The tumpara tarsier species has a population of approximately 1,358–12,470 and is declining due to the many threats they face.

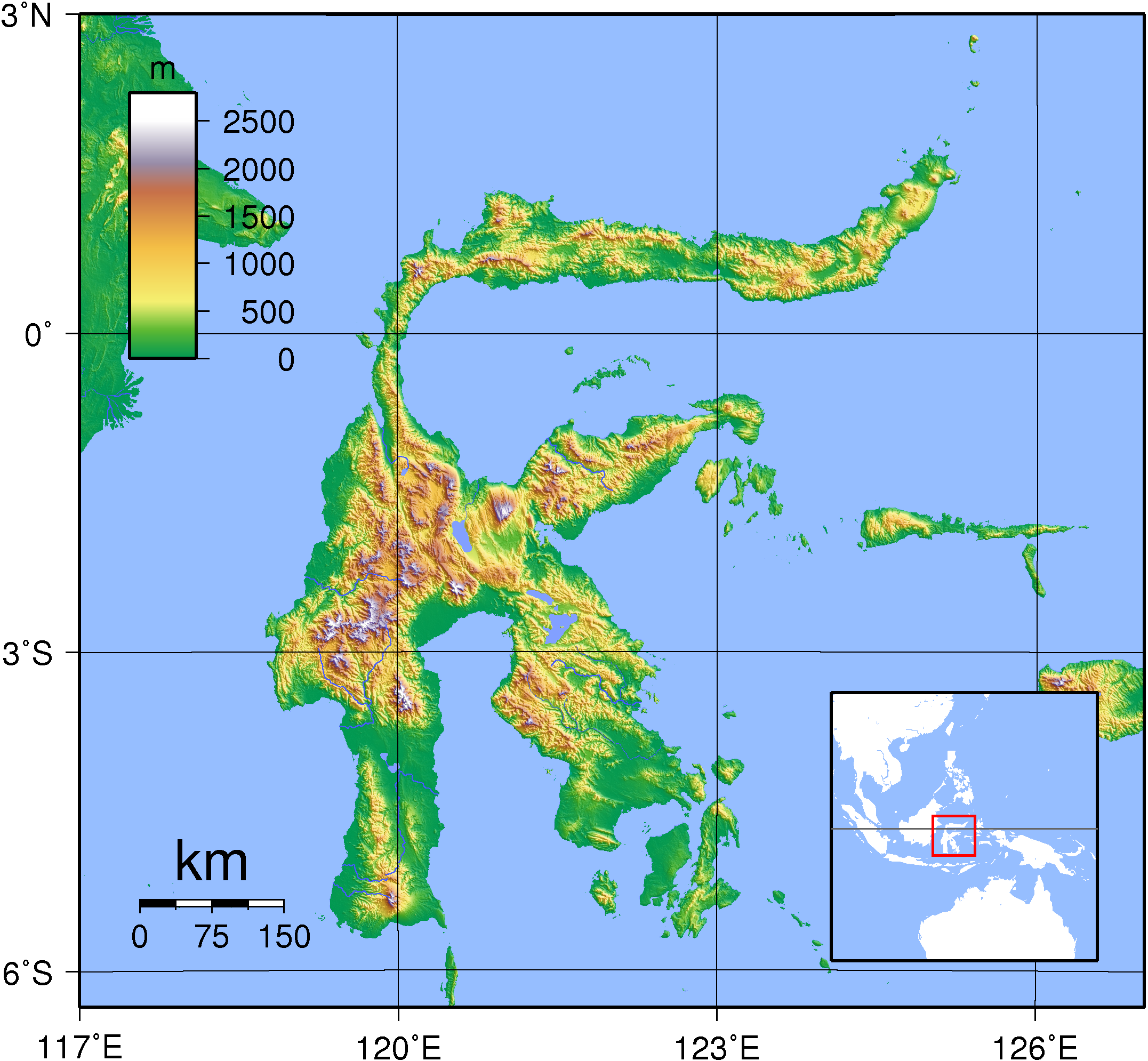
Sulawesi map

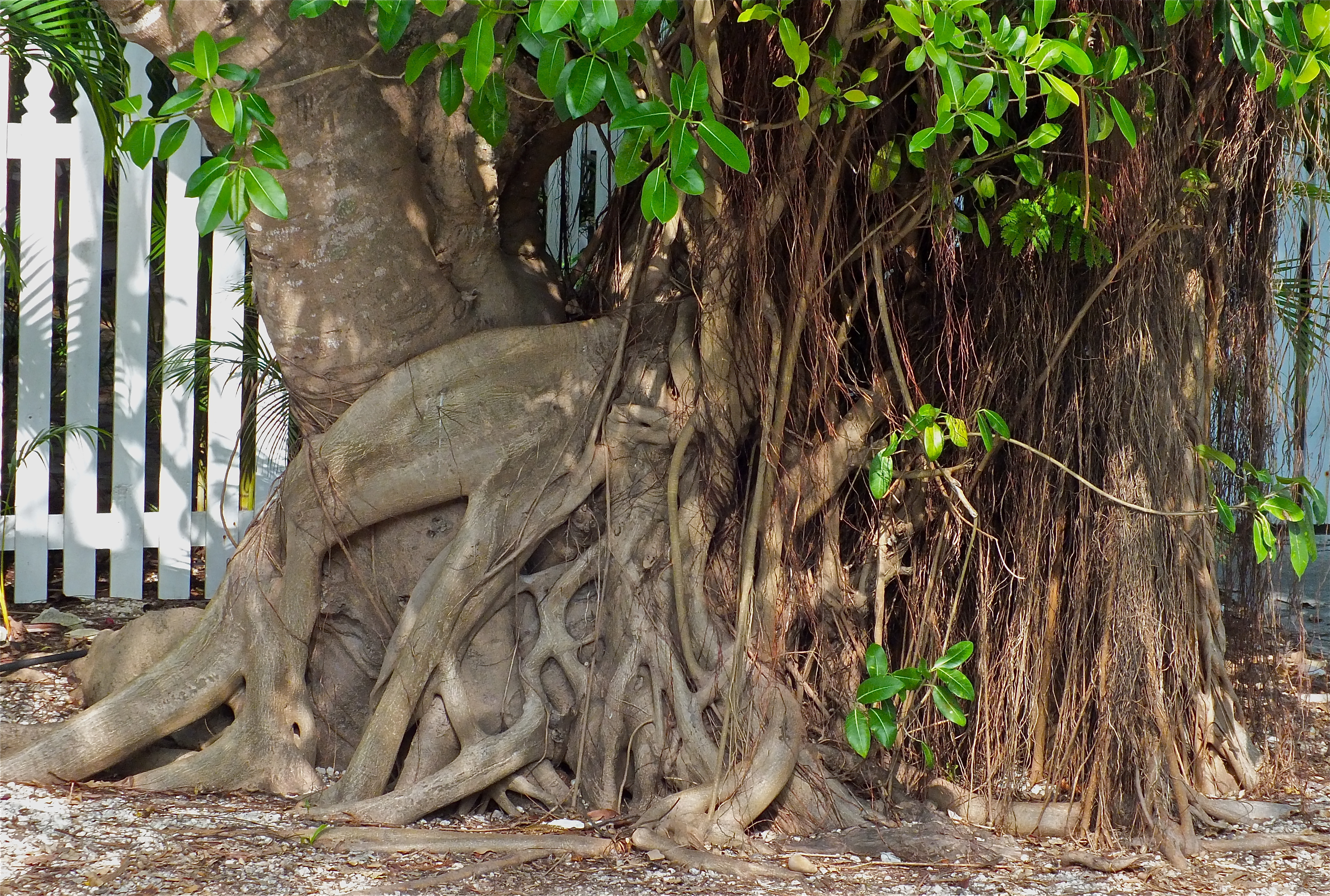
The Ficus tree, a tarsier habitat

=== Habitat ===
The tarsier species are nocturnal and can be found sleeping in tree holes during the day, especially those of fig trees (Ficus), depending on what forest they are in. They can usually be found entering their trees to go sleep between 5:00 AM and 6:00 AM. The members of each group sleep individually in their own trees to avoid a predator attack on the entire family.

== Taxonomy ==
Its existence as a distinct taxon was predicted by the hybrid biogeographic hypothesis for Sulawesi. The rationale was that a geographic discontinuity existed between the northern tip of Sulawesi, and the population of tarsiers on Sangihe Island (the Sangihe tarsier Tarsius sangirensis), approximately 200 kilometres (120 mi) to the north. In between, lay very deep oceans and three island clusters, Biaro, Tagulandang/Ruang, and Siau. Like Sangihe Island, itself, each of these three island clusters are a part of the Sangihe Island volcanic arc. Volcanic arcs, like the Galapagos and Hawaiian Island chains, feature islands that erupt from the ocean floor. In such circumstances, islands form independently, are colonized independently, and remain geographically isolated. These characteristics lead to high levels of endemism. The presence of tarsiers on the most distant island group in the Sangihe volcanic arc (i.e. Sangihe island), led to curiosity about the presence of tarsiers on the other islands in the chain. Each of the three island clusters mentioned above were surveyed for the presence of tarsiers in 2004 and 2005, but tarsiers were only observed on Siau.

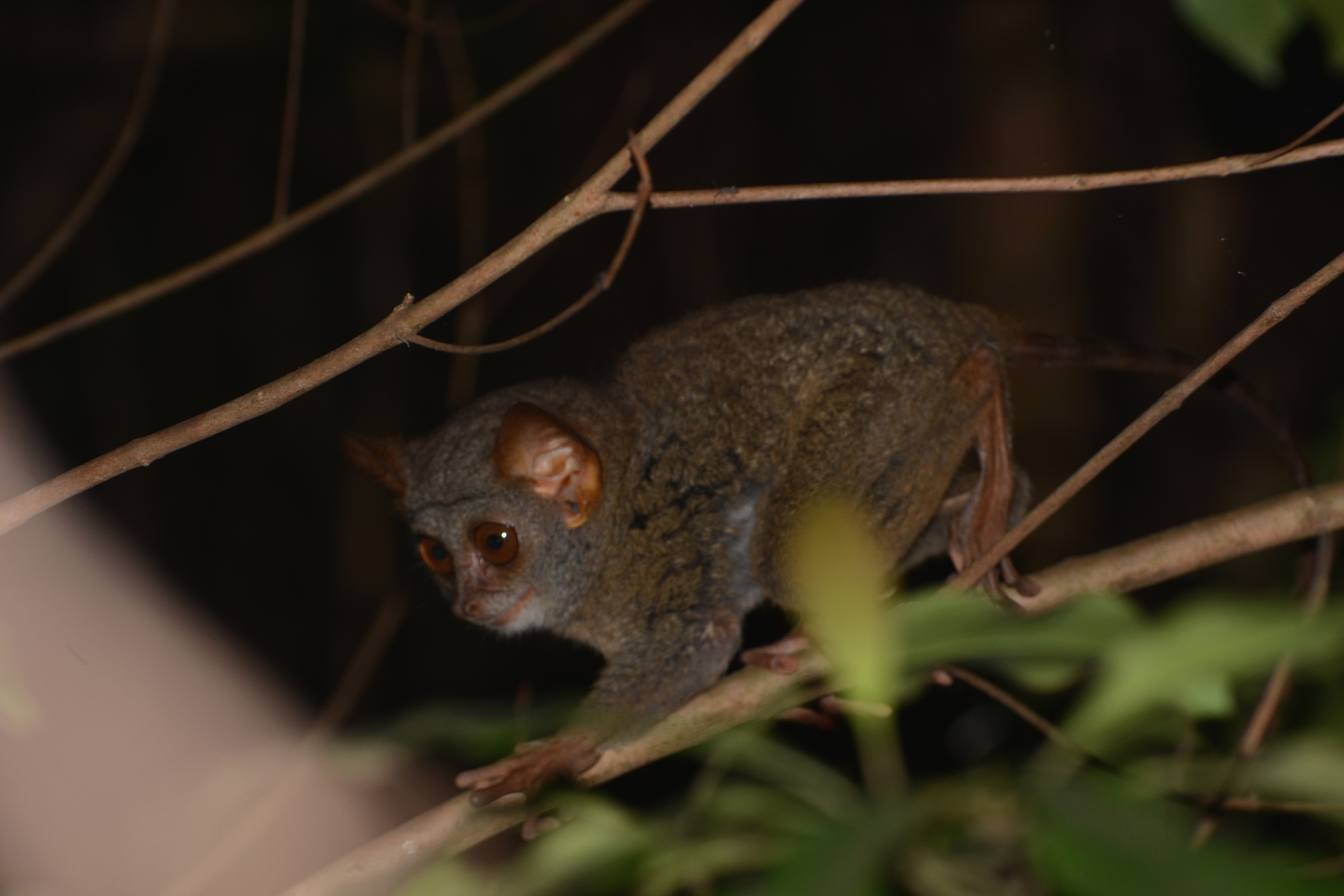
T. tumpara on a tree

It was furthermore elaborated upon that the original description of T. sangirensis included mention of a specimen from Siau in the Dresden Museum. Thus it was argued for further investigations of the Siau tarsier to see if it was taxonomically separable from T. sangirensis.

== Conservation ==
The Sangihe Islands are known for their critically endangered avifauna, and concerns about the conservation status of the Siau Island tarsier grew before its formal description. The Siau Island tarsier was selected for the list of "The World's 25 Most Endangered Primates" by the IUCN Species Survival Commission, Primate Specialist Group. This species of tarsier is critically endangered because they are hunted for their meat, used as traditional medicine, and sold as domestic pets in the pet trade. Its habit is at risk since it is not recorded as a protected area, and therefore is subjective to drastic habitat loss if no conservation practices are put in place. The progressive disappearance of its habitat, with the large population of the Siau people [311 people/km2], restrains the primate communities within a small area. Other threats include the volcanic activities of the island, though most of these are interconnected and all play an important role in the endangerment of the tumpara tarsier. This species is rapidly declining, having declined by more than 25% in the last 25 years.

=== Predators ===
The species primary predators are humans, arboreal snakes, lizards, birds of prey and feral cats. However, their cryptic behaviour makes it difficult for predators to catch them.
