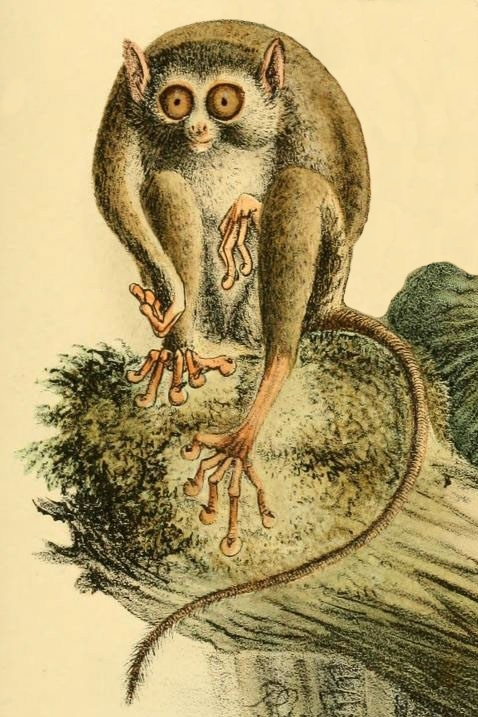

Conservation status
- Endangered (IUCN 3.1)

Scientific classification
- Kingdom: Animalia
- Phylum: Chordata
- Class: Mammalia
- Infraclass: Placentalia
- Order: Primates
- Family: Tarsiidae
- Genus: Tarsius
- Species: T. sangirensis

Binomial name
- Tarsius sangirensis Meyer, 1897
- Sangihe tarsier range

= Sangihe tarsier =

Species of primate

The Sangihe tarsier (Tarsius sangirensis), also known as Sangihe Island tarsier, is a small primate found on Sangir Island, which is located about 200 kilometers north-east of the island of Sulawesi in Indonesia. In 2008 a population of the Sangihe tarsier was determined to be a distinct species, the Siau Island tarsier (Tarsius tumpara). Locally in the Sangihe dialect of Sangir language, tarsiers are called Senggasi or Higo.

== Taxonomy ==
It was first assigned species status in 1896 by Adolf Meyer. It was later classified as a subspecies of the spectral tarsier T. spectrum by Hill and remained so until recently. Today it is recognized as a distinct species. The Siau Island tarsier, Tarsius tumpara, from Siau Island was formerly considered a population of the Sangihe tarsier, but was determined to be a separate species in 2008. There is still much debate on what is considered a species and a subspecies in the family Tarsiidae.

== Description ==
The large, round, forward-facing, pale-chestnut-colored eyes and elongated digits and tarsus are basic characteristics of the Sangihe tarsier. It is a very small primate weighing between 100 and 120 grams. It has sharp teeth, since it strictly eats animal matter. The tails are very long compared to body size and are used for support while stationary but are not truly prehensile in nature. Upper pelage is yellowish brown with dark-grey bases. Lower parts of it are a dullish-white with a light-grey base. Its eyes are immobile but it has the ability to rotate its head 180 degrees. The best way to distinguish this species from other tarsier species is by the amount of fur on its tail, and its "acoustics" (calls). The Sangihe tail has a sparse covering of dorsal fur, and does not have scales underneath.

== Distribution and habitat ==
The Sangihe tarsier is endemic to the Sangihe Islands in Indonesia which is only 547 km^{2}. It favors primary-growth forest but also fares well in secondary-growth forest. It also has been found in scrub habitats, coconut plantations, and in some cases agricultural areas. However, researchers are not sure if the populations found in agricultural areas are due to source-sink dynamic. All tarsiers live within 10 latitudinal degrees of the equator and require humid conditions, at least 50% humidity.

== Behaviour and ecology ==
The mating pattern is monogamous or polygamous. It tends to be solitary or lives in small groups of 2–6. Groups mainly consist of the parents and offspring. Little is known about their specific mating patterns and reproduction development. What is known is based on better-documented species. It normally gives birth to a single offspring. There is little sexual dimorphism. It is a nocturnal species, which makes it even harder to document. Most tarsiers are relatively silent creatures and only make chirping sounds. Chirping can be mostly heard when males are trying to mate with females. Most of its communication is through scent, such as urine.

=== Diet ===
It eats mainly insects such as grasshoppers and beetles. It is occasionally seen eating small vertebrates like lizards. Tarsiers are the only known primates that are completely carnivorous. The digestive tract is very simple and short. It does not forage for insects like other insectivores but instead sits and waits. Once prey is spotted it will use its hands to grab it or leap and catch it.

== Conservation ==
The Sangihe tarsier is listed as endangered on the IUCN Red List. It is listed as an Appendix II species under CITES. Currently there are no specific conservation programs for this species of tarsier. There is also a lack of nature reserves located in its native land. It is very difficult to have any type of ex situ conservation for this species, since it does not fare well outside their natural habitat. Since little is known about the species' reproduction patterns, there are not any breeding programs currently. Shekelle and Salim made some proposals on better protection for this species along with the Siau Island tarsier. Such actions include more investments on improving ex situ conservation, mimic sanctuaries found for a subspecies of the Philippine tarsier Carlito syrichta fraterculus along with tarsier-tracking activities. Some of the above would increase ecotourism in the area and improve economics in the area. The authors also recommend increasing awareness of the species and advising people on how to better manage their lands to improve chances of the survival of the species.

=== Threats ===
The population is thought to be between 1,505 and 52,734. Accurate numbers are hard to estimate due to cloud coverage over its range. Some of its natural threats include birds, snakes, and the giant civet. Mount Awu can also be considered a natural threat as well, since it is an active and deadly volcano on the island. Anthropogenic causes include habitat loss or fragmentation, the introduction of cats and dogs to the island, population density increases in its territory, and pet trade.
