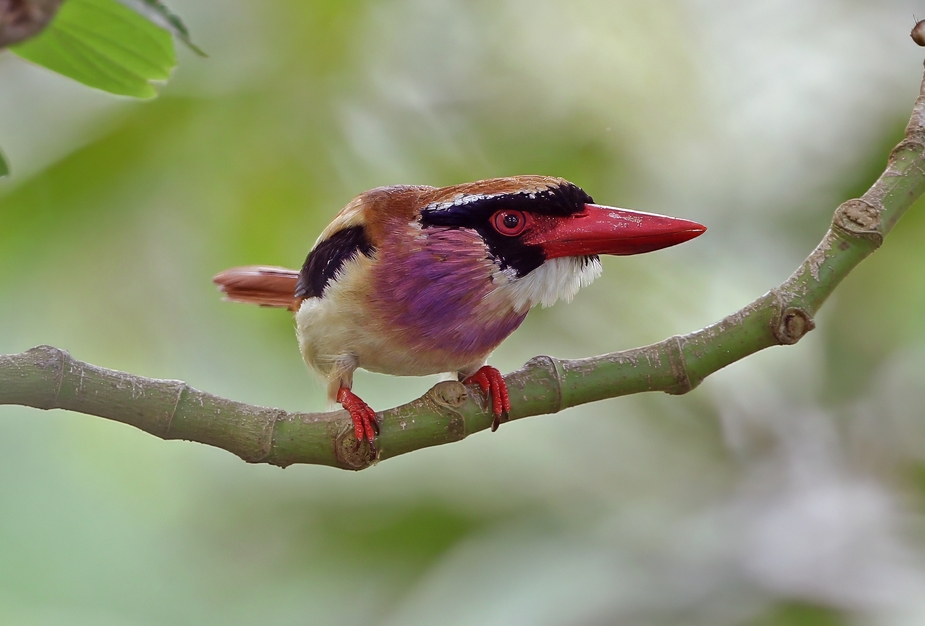

Conservation status
- Least Concern (IUCN 3.1)

Scientific classification
- Kingdom: Animalia
- Phylum: Chordata
- Class: Aves
- Order: Coraciiformes
- Family: Alcedinidae
- Subfamily: Halcyoninae
- Genus: Cittura
- Species: C. sanghirensis

Binomial name
- Cittura sanghirensis Sharpe, 1868

Synonyms
- Cittura cyanotis sanghirensis

= Sangihe lilac kingfisher =

Species of bird

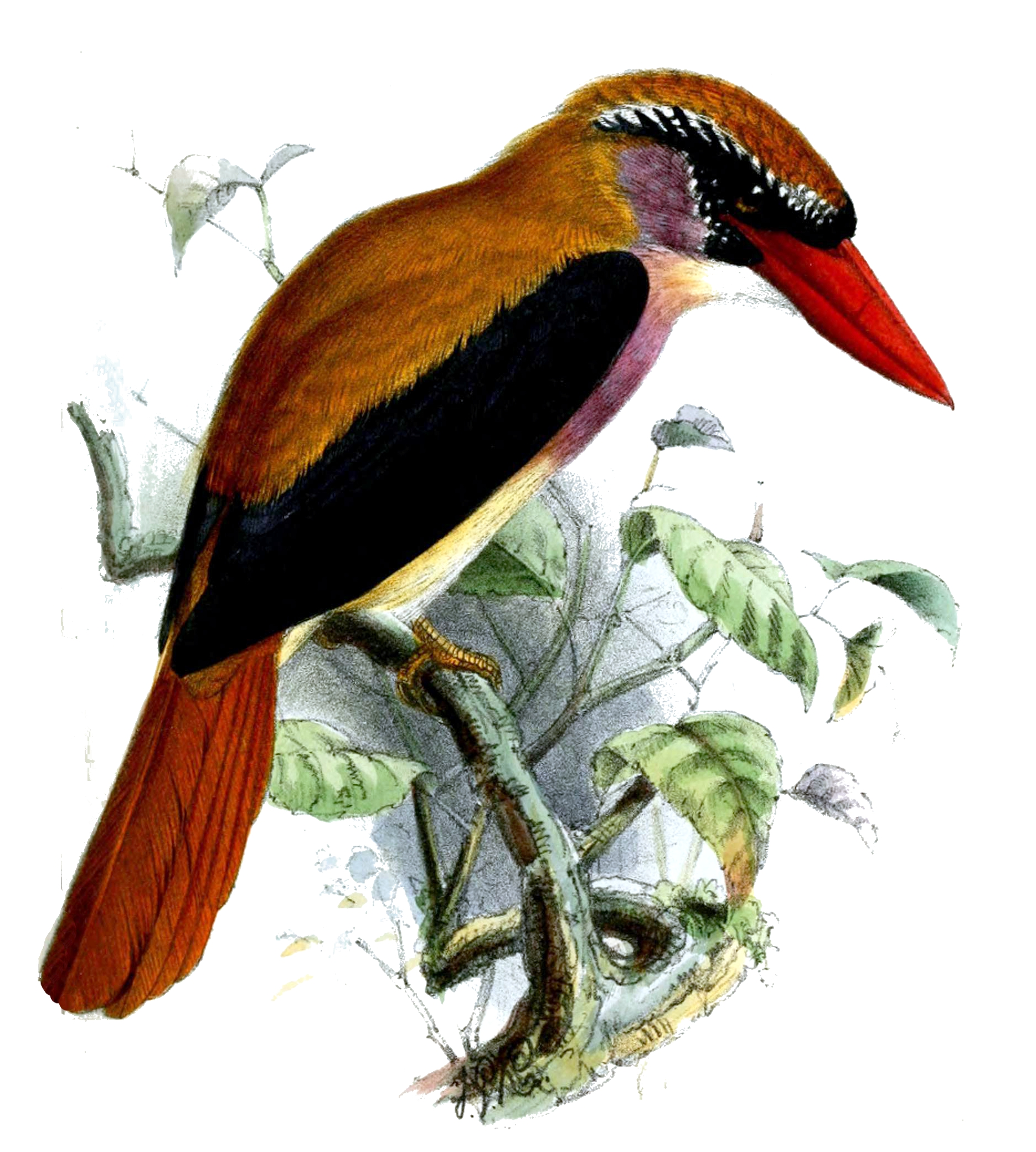
1868 illustration of C. sanghirensis from Proceedings of the Zoological Society of London.

The Sangihe lilac kingfisher (Cittura sanghirensis) is a species of kingfisher in the genus Cittura, endemic to the lowlands of the Indonesian island of Sangihe. It was previously considered a subspecies of the Sulawesi lilac kingfisher (C. cyanotis), but was split as a distinct species by the IUCN Red List and BirdLife International in 2014, and the International Ornithological Congress and Clements followed suit in 2022.
