= Aditinggi =

Volcano deity in Indonesia

Aditinggi is a volcano deity of the Siau Island, and is associated with Karangetang, a volcano on the north side of Siau.

Aditinggi was the original name of Karangetang. An oral tradition states that there was once a land called Alamina between Bacan and Mindanao. The islanders were led by Ampuang Tatetu, their high priest. One day, the spirit of Aditinggi, who was displeased by the disobedient humans, was channel through the high priest. The high priest climbed on top of Karangetang, and what followed was a volcanic eruption that destroyed Alamina.
