= Mount Ruang =

Stratovolcano in North Sulawesi, Indonesia

Ruang
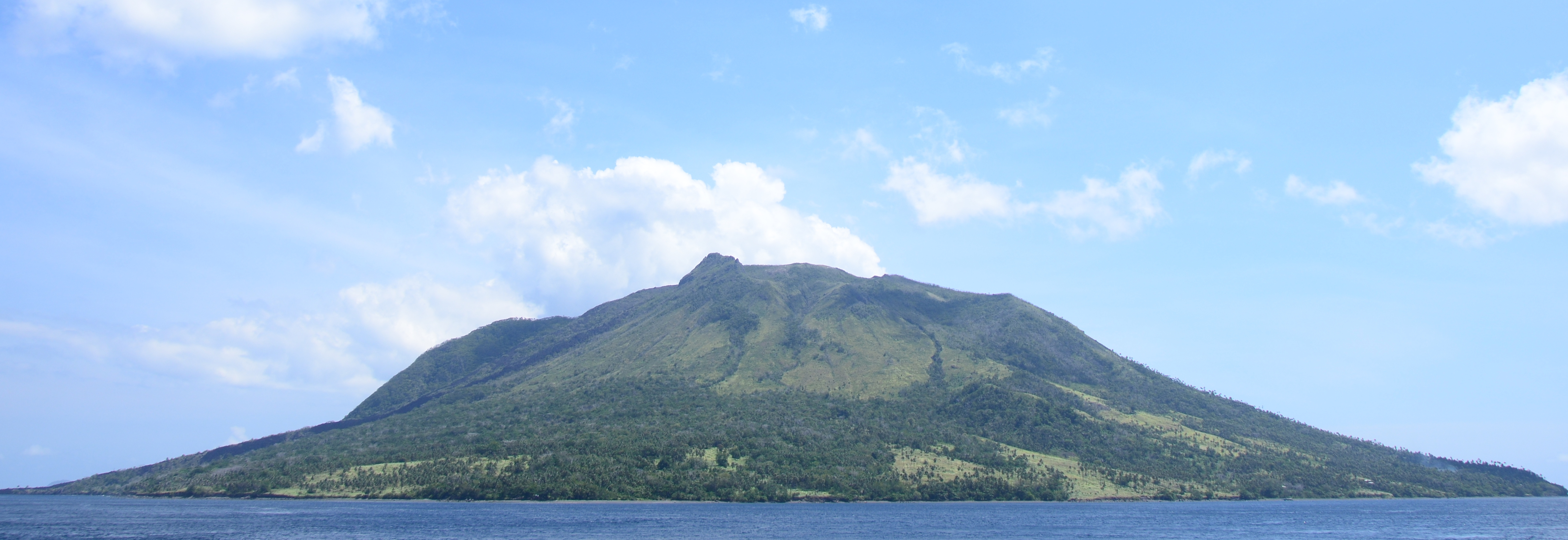
- Ruang from the island of Tagulandang, in March 2016

Highest point
- Elevation: 725 m (2,379 ft)
- Listing: Spesial Ribu
- Coordinates: 2°18′18″N 125°21′54″E

Geography
- Location: Siau Tagulandang Biaro Islands Regency, Sangihe Islands, Indonesia

Geology
- Mountain type: Stratovolcano
- Last eruption: April 2024

Ruang is the southernmost stratovolcano in the Sangihe Islands arc, North Sulawesi, Indonesia. It comprises an island 4 by 5 kilometres (2.5 mi × 3.1 mi) wide. The summit contains a partial lava dome and reaches some 725 metres (2,379 ft) in altitude. From its summit, Klabat's peak in the south, that of Siau to the north, and Ternate to the east can all be seen.

== Geology ==
The top of the mountain is partially filled with a lava dome formed as a result of activity in 1904. Since then, volcanic activity has been observed with the formation of lava domes and pyroclastic flows. The island volcano is 4 by 5 kilometres (2.5 mi × 3.1 mi) wide.

== Eruptions ==
=== Pre-21st century ===
At least 16 eruptions have been recorded from the volcano, with the first one occurring in 1808. Dr. Adolf Meyer witnessed a large eruption in 1871. Ruang was uninhabited at the time, but the inhabitants of nearby Tagulandang had many plantations on its slopes. The eruption destroyed these in minutes and caused a tsunami that obliterated most of their large village, situated on Tagulandang, opposite Ruang. Most of the village's inhabitants drowned, and their bodies afterward could be seen on the beach. The death toll was estimated to be around 300 to 400.

=== April 2024 ===
Eruptions that began at 9:45pm (13:45 GMT) on 16 April forced over 800 people to evacuate the island for nearby Tagulandang. A 4-kilometre (2.5 mi) exclusion zone from the crater was established and extended to 6 kilometres (3.7 mi). On 17 April, authorities raised the volcano's alert level to four, the highest in Indonesia and issued a tsunami alert which led to orders for 11,000 residents and evacuees in Tagulandang to be moved to Manado in mainland Sulawesi, citing the risk of the volcano collapsing into the sea. The eruption also prompted the shutdown of Sam Ratulangi International Airport in Manado. Siau Tagulandang Biaro Islands Regency, where the volcano is located, declared a 14-day state of emergency. At least 501 houses and buildings were damaged by the eruption. After a two-week reduction in activity, the volcano erupted again on 30 April, forcing the closure of Sam Ratulangi airport and other airports as far as Gorontalo Province. All 843 residents of Ruang island were evacuated to Manado, while 12,000 residents of Tagulandang were relocated to Siau Island by ship.

Airlines from West Malaysia and Singapore cancelled flights to Sabah and Sarawak on 18 April due to reduced visibility. The sulphur dioxide plume from the volcano extended 1,000 kilometres (620 mi), covering the whole of Borneo as of 19 April. However, both Sabah and Sarawak surface air quality are not affected by the eruption.

Volcanic smoke from the Mount Ruang eruption was also seen on Brunei airspace despite only for a brief time but Bruneians are advised do not travelling to Sulawesi temporarily due to the Mount Ruang eruption.

== See also ==
- List of volcanoes in Indonesia
