= Siau =

Siau may refer to:

- Siau Island
- Api Siau
- Siau scops owl (Otus manadensis siaoensis)
- Siau languages
- Kingdom of Siau
