= Salili =

- Village
- Location within Indonesia
- Coordinates: 02°44′55″N 125°23′04″E
- Country: Indonesia
- Province: North Sulawesi
- Regency: Sitaro Islands Regency
- Elevation: 831 m (2,726 ft)
- Time zone: UTC+7 (WIB)

Salili is a village on Siau Island in the Sitaro Islands Regency, North Sulawesi Province, Indonesia. The village is located on the slope of Mount Karangetang, south-west of the peak, beside the stream known as Salu Salili. 600 meters from the village is the site of an Indonesian government seismic and volcano observation post (Volcanological Survey of Indonesia).

Karangetang is one of the most active volcanoes in Indonesia, having erupted 41 times since 1675.
