= Tampea accepta =

Scientific classification
- Domain: Eukaryota
- Kingdom: Animalia
- Phylum: Arthropoda
- Class: Insecta
- Order: Lepidoptera
- Superfamily: Noctuoidea
- Family: Erebidae
- Subfamily: Arctiinae
- Genus: Tampea
- Species: T. accepta

Binomial name
- Tampea accepta (Butler, 1877)

Synonyms
- Setina accepta Butler, 1877; Graptasura bitincta Rothschild, 1913

Species of moth

Tampea accepta is a moth of the subfamily Arctiinae first described by Arthur Gardiner Butler in 1877. It is found on Borneo, the Philippines, Sangihe, Sulawesi, Sula Mangoli and the Kei Islands. The habitat consists of lowland forests.

The forewings are dull orange yellow. The hindwings are paler.
