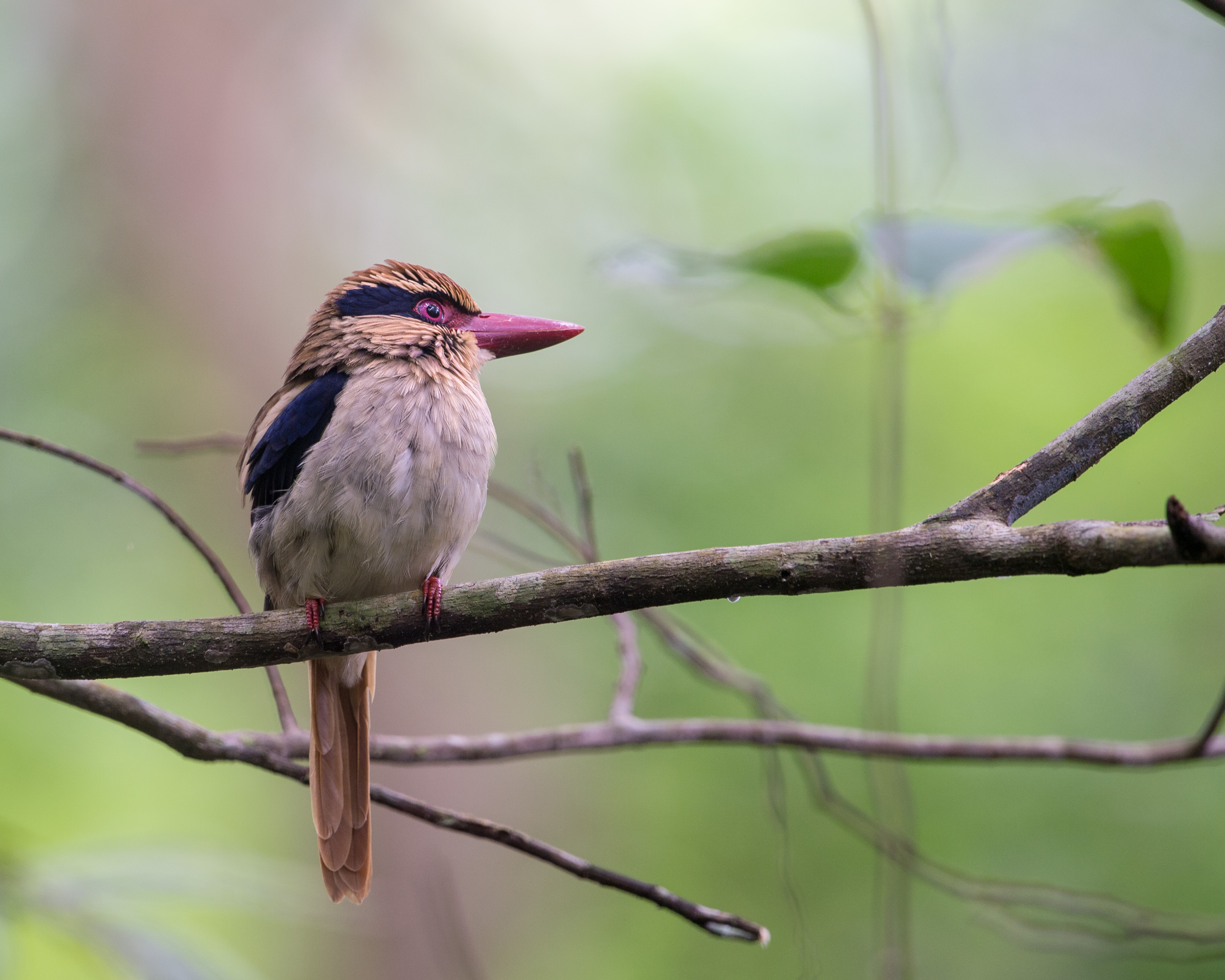
- Sulawesi lilac kingfisher, Cittura cyanotis

Scientific classification
- Kingdom: Animalia
- Phylum: Chordata
- Class: Aves
- Order: Coraciiformes
- Family: Alcedinidae
- Subfamily: Halcyoninae
- Genus: Cittura; Kaup, 1848

Type species
- Dacelo cyanotis Temminck, 1824

= Lilac kingfisher =

Genus of birds

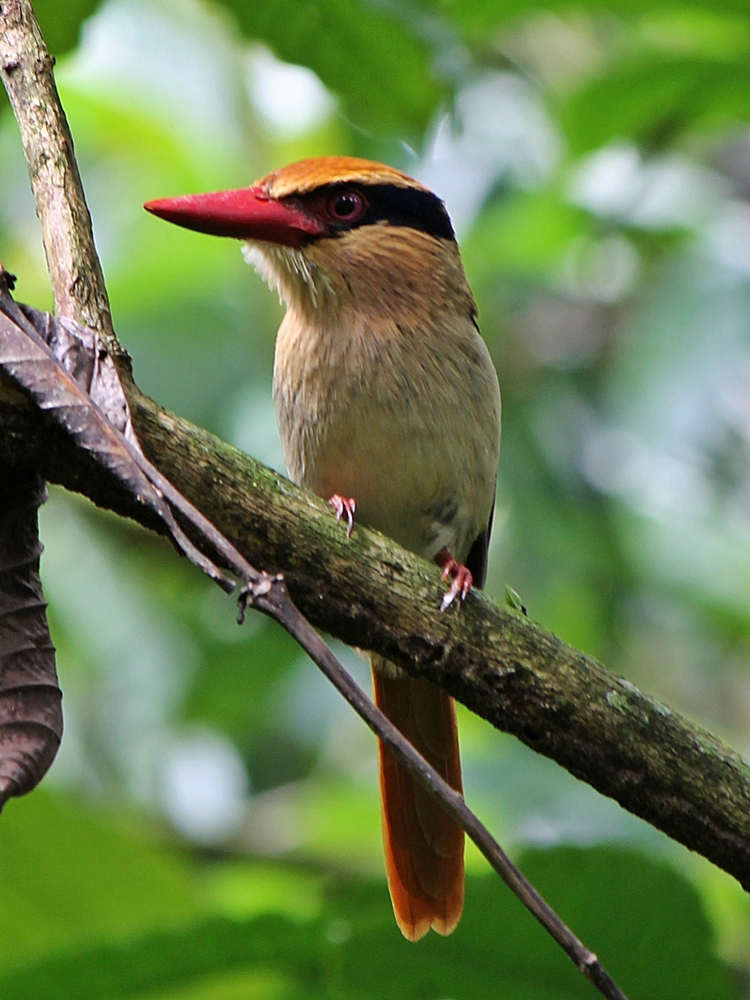
Cittura cyanotis at Bintauna

Lilac kingfishers are kingfishers in the genus Cittura, found in the lowlands of the Indonesia island of Sulawesi and the neighbouring Sangihe and Talaud Islands.

== Taxonomy ==
The genus Cittura was introduced by the German naturalist Johann Jakob Kaup in 1848. The genus name is from classical Greek kitta for "magpie" and oura for "tail".

There are two species:

Genus Cittura – Kaup, 1848 – two species
Common name	Scientific name and subspecies	Range	Size and ecology	IUCN status and estimated population
Sangihe lilac kingfisher	Cittura sanghirensis Sharpe, 1868	Sangihe and Talaud Islands	Size: Habitat: Diet:	NT
Sulawesi lilac kingfisher Male Female	Cittura cyanotis (Temminck, 1824)	northern Sulawesi and Lembeh Island	Size: Habitat: Diet:	LC
