= Tampea metaphaeola =

Scientific classification
- Kingdom: Animalia
- Phylum: Arthropoda
- Class: Insecta
- Order: Lepidoptera
- Superfamily: Noctuoidea
- Family: Erebidae
- Subfamily: Arctiinae
- Genus: Tampea
- Species: T. metaphaeola

Binomial name
- Tampea metaphaeola (Hampson, 1900)

Synonyms
- Eurosia metaphaeola Hampson, 1900

Species of moth

Tampea metaphaeola is a moth of the subfamily Arctiinae first described by George Hampson in 1900. It is found on Borneo, Sulawesi and Sangir.
