= Tampea acanthocera =

Scientific classification
- Kingdom: Animalia
- Phylum: Arthropoda
- Class: Insecta
- Order: Lepidoptera
- Superfamily: Noctuoidea
- Family: Erebidae
- Subfamily: Arctiinae
- Genus: Tampea
- Species: T. acanthocera

Binomial name
- Tampea acanthocera (Hampson, 1905)

Synonyms
- Eurosia acanthocera Hampson, 1905

Species of moth

Tampea acanthocera is a moth of the subfamily Arctiinae first described by George Hampson in 1905. It is found on Sangihe in Indonesia.
