= Mount Sahendaruman =

Mountain in Indonesia

Highest point
- Coordinates: 3.516667°N 125.533333°E

Geography
- Location: Sangihe, Indonesia

Mount Sahendaruman is an extinct volcano located in southern part of Indonesian island of Sangihe.

It is an area high in biodiversity in Wallacea, especially seen in the small forest patch in mountain slopes Mount Sahendaruman, the last remaining primary forest in Sangihe.

Mount Sahendaruman is home to three critically endangered and two endangered endemic bird species, the cerulean flycatcher, Sangihe whistler, Sangihe white-eye, elegant sunbird and Sangihe hanging parrot.
