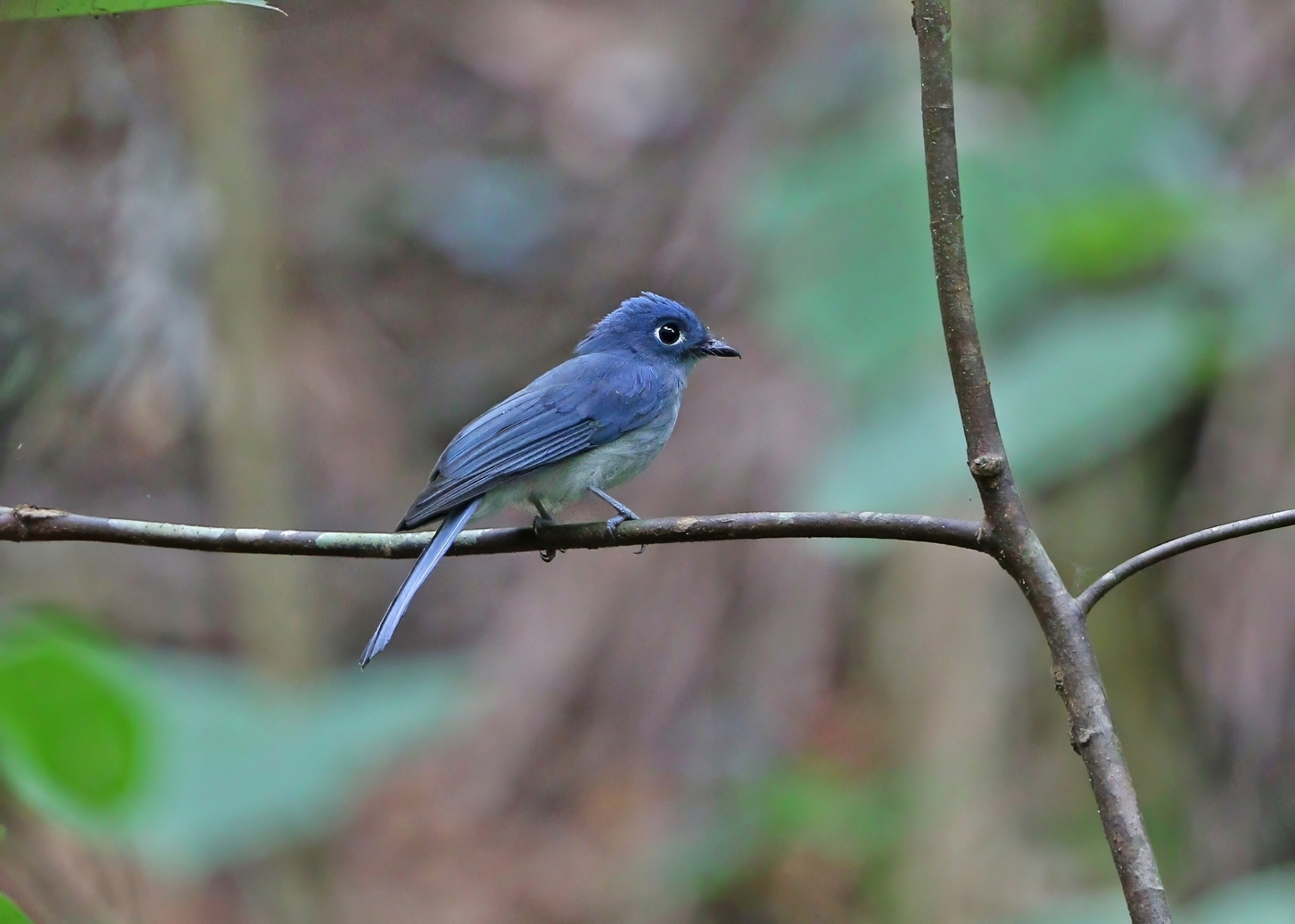

Conservation status
- Critically Endangered (IUCN 3.1)

Scientific classification
- Kingdom: Animalia
- Phylum: Chordata
- Class: Aves
- Order: Passeriformes
- Family: Rhipiduridae
- Subfamily: Lamproliinae
- Genus: Eutrichomyias; Meise, 1939
- Species: E. rowleyi

Binomial name
- Eutrichomyias rowleyi (Meyer, 1878)

Synonyms
- Zeocephus rowleyi

= Cerulean flycatcher =

Species of bird

The cerulean flycatcher (Eutrichomyias rowleyi) is a medium-sized (up to 18 cm long), blue passerine with bright caerulean blue plumage, a bare white orbital ring, dark brown iris, bluish black bill and pale blue-grey below. The young has a shorter tail and grey underparts. It is the only member of the monotypic genus Eutrichomyias. Although it resembles a monarch flycatcher, it is actually related to the fantails.

== Taxonomy and systematics ==
The scientific name commemorates the British explorer and ornithologist George Dawson Rowley. The cerulean flycatcher was originally described in the genus Zeocephus, and until recently was known as the cerulean paradise flycatcher. Alternate names include Rowley's flycatcher and Rowley's paradise-flycatcher. Although initially classified in Monarchidae, a 2017 study involving sequencing of DNA from the type specimen found that it was a member of the fantail family Rhipiduridae, being classified in the basal subfamily Lamproliinae (sometimes considered a distinct family) along with Chaetorhynchus and Lamprolia. This finding was accepted by the IOC, who renamed the species from "cerulean paradise flycatcher" to just "cerulean flycatcher".

== Distribution and habitat ==
The cerulean flycatcher is endemic to the island of Sangihe, off North Sulawesi in Indonesia. Previously known only from a single specimen collected in 1873, this rare bird was rediscovered in October 1998 around forested valleys of Mount Sahendaruman in southern Sangihe.

== Behaviour and ecology ==
=== Food and feeding ===
Its diet consists mainly of insects and other small invertebrates.

=== Threats ===
Due to ongoing habitat loss, a small population size, and limited range, the cerulean flycatcher is evaluated as Critically Endangered on the IUCN Red List of Threatened Species.
