= Tampea =

Scientific classification
- Kingdom: Animalia
- Phylum: Arthropoda
- Class: Insecta
- Order: Lepidoptera
- Superfamily: Noctuoidea
- Family: Erebidae
- Subfamily: Arctiinae
- Tribe: Lithosiini
- Genus: Tampea; Snellen, 1897

Synonyms
- Ocrosia Hampson, 1900

Genus of moths

Tampea is a genus of moths in the subfamily Arctiinae.

== Species ==
- Tampea acanthocera (Hampson, 1905)
- Tampea accepta (Butler, 1877)
- Tampea hammatocera (Wileman & West, 1928)
- Tampea metaphaeola (Hampson, 1900)
- Tampea nodosa Holloway, 2001
- Tampea reversa Walker, 1862
- Tampea wollastoni Rothschild, 1916
