= Temboko Lehi Beach =

Beach in Siau, North Sulawesi, Indonesia

Temboko Lehi Beach (Indonesian: Pantai Temboko Lehi) or also known as Lehi Beach is a beach located in Tagulandang Biaro (Sitaro) district of Siau, North Sulawesi province in Indonesia. The beach is about 137 kilometers from the city center of Manado.

The unique feature of this beach is the warm water, rather than cold water of the sea, as it is located at the foot of Gunung Api Karangetang that is an active volcano. This is the only hot water beach in Indonesia. Because of warm water no fishes swims around the beach. Lehi beach has rugged and rocky coast. There are large stones, from the curve of which warm sensation of hot water vapor comes out from the rocks. There are also hot springs among the coral reefs.
