= Tampea wollastoni =

Scientific classification
- Domain: Eukaryota
- Kingdom: Animalia
- Phylum: Arthropoda
- Class: Insecta
- Order: Lepidoptera
- Superfamily: Noctuoidea
- Family: Erebidae
- Subfamily: Arctiinae
- Genus: Tampea
- Species: T. wollastoni

Binomial name
- Tampea wollastoni Rothschild, 1916

Species of moth

Tampea wollastoni is a moth in the subfamily Arctiinae. It was described by Walter Rothschild in 1916. It is found in Papua New Guinea.
