= Tampea reversa =

Scientific classification
- Kingdom: Animalia
- Phylum: Arthropoda
- Class: Insecta
- Order: Lepidoptera
- Superfamily: Noctuoidea
- Family: Erebidae
- Subfamily: Arctiinae
- Genus: Tampea
- Species: T. reversa

Binomial name
- Tampea reversa (Walker, 1862)

Synonyms
- Lithosia reversa Walker, 1862; Tampea lithosioides Snellen, 1897

Species of moth

Tampea reversa is a moth in the subfamily Arctiinae. It was described by Francis Walker in 1862. It is found on Borneo and Java. The habitat consists of lowland areas and lower montane forests.

Adults males are pale orange yellow. Females have a deeper forewing colour and a grey hindwing with yellow fringes.
