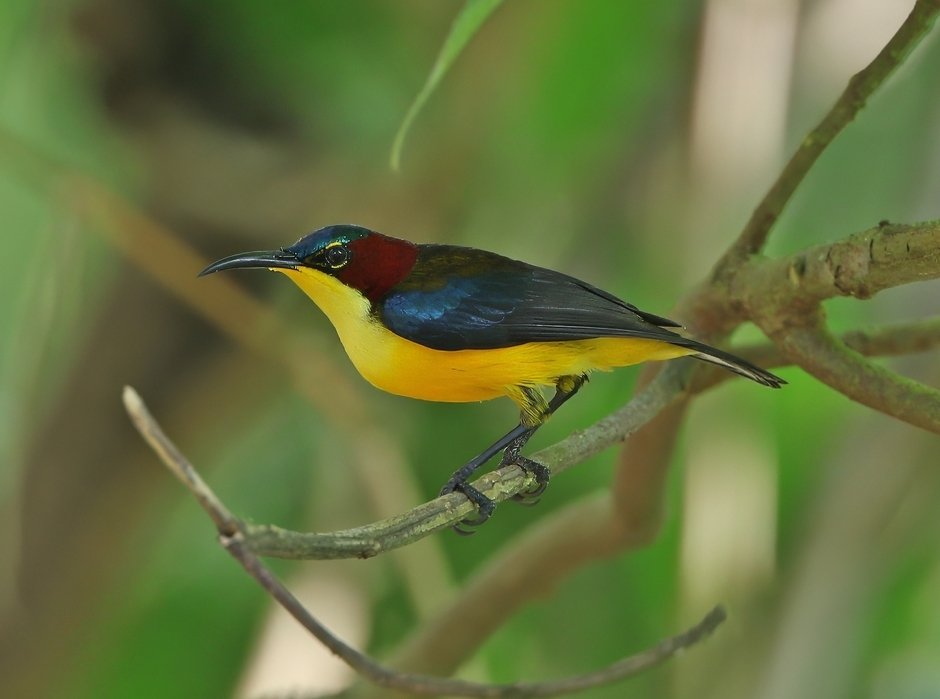
- Male
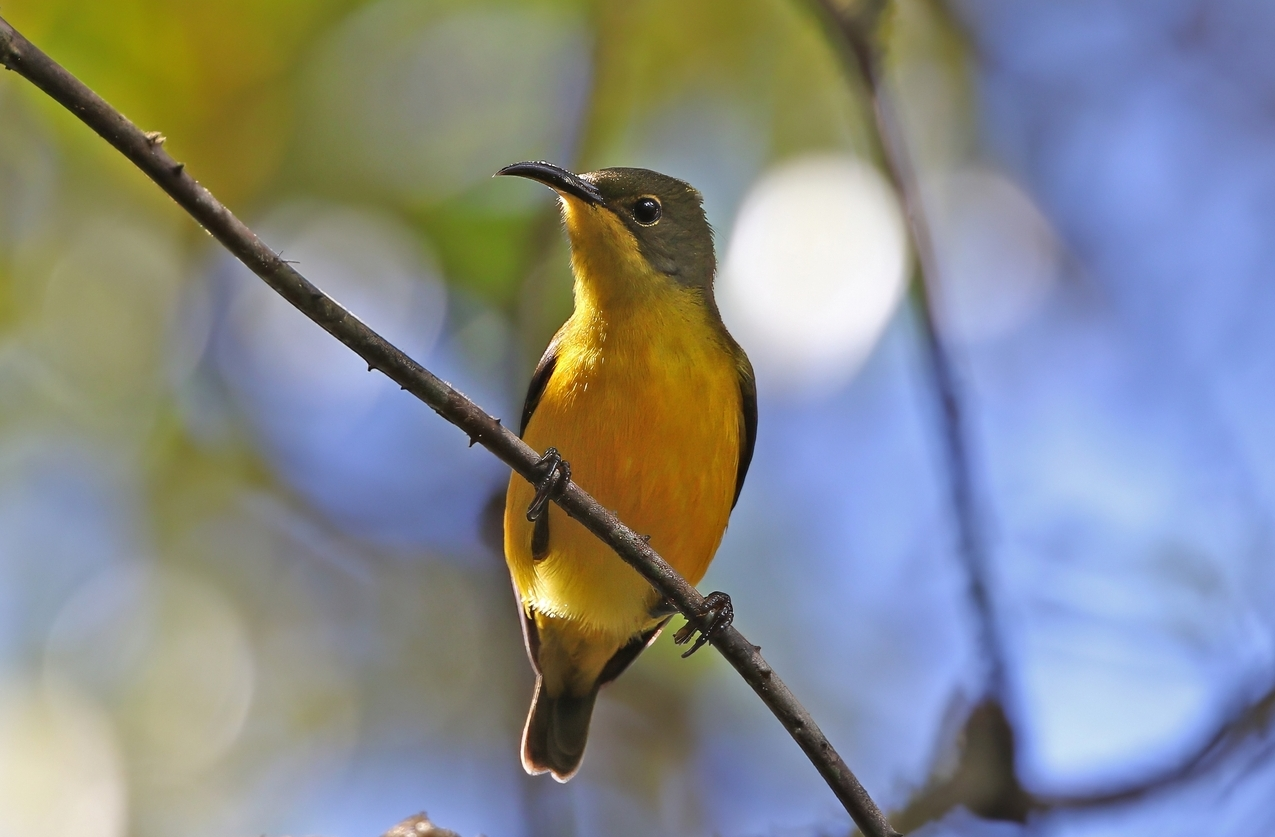
- Female

Conservation status
- Vulnerable (IUCN 3.1)

Scientific classification
- Kingdom: Animalia
- Phylum: Chordata
- Class: Aves
- Order: Passeriformes
- Family: Nectariniidae
- Genus: Aethopyga
- Species: A. duyvenbodei

Binomial name
- Aethopyga duyvenbodei (Schlegel, 1871)

= Elegant sunbird =

Species of bird

The elegant sunbird (Aethopyga duyvenbodei) is a large, up to 12 cm long, Australasian sunbird in the genus Aethopyga. The male has an iridescent blue-green crown, shoulder patch and uppertail coverts, yellow bar across lower back, red ear coverts, olive back, yellow throat, red neck collar and yellow below. The female has a yellowish olive upperparts, scaly crown and yellow underparts.

The scientific name commemorates Maarten Dirk van Renesse van Duivenbode (1804–1878), Dutch trader of naturalia on Ternate.

An Indonesian endemic, the elegant sunbird is distributed to the island of Sangihe, north of Sulawesi. It is found and locally common in the forests and plantations near Mount Sahendaruman in southern Sangihe.

Due to ongoing habitat loss, small population size and limited range, the elegant sunbird is evaluated as vulnerable on the IUCN Red List of Threatened Species.
