= Tampea hammatocera =

Scientific classification
- Domain: Eukaryota
- Kingdom: Animalia
- Phylum: Arthropoda
- Class: Insecta
- Order: Lepidoptera
- Superfamily: Noctuoidea
- Family: Erebidae
- Subfamily: Arctiinae
- Genus: Tampea
- Species: T. hammatocera

Binomial name
- Tampea hammatocera Wileman & West, 1928

Synonyms
- Eurosia hammatocera Wileman & West, 1928

Species of moth

Tampea hammatocera is a moth of the subfamily Arctiinae first described by Wileman and West in 1928. It is found on Luzon in the Philippines.
