= Tampea nodosa =

Scientific classification
- Kingdom: Animalia
- Phylum: Arthropoda
- Clade: Pancrustacea
- Class: Insecta
- Order: Lepidoptera
- Superfamily: Noctuoidea
- Family: Erebidae
- Subfamily: Arctiinae
- Genus: Tampea
- Species: T. nodosa

Binomial name
- Tampea nodosa Holloway, 2001

Species of moth

Tampea nodosa is a moth in the subfamily Arctiinae. It was described by Jeremy Daniel Holloway in 2001. It is found on Borneo. The habitat consists of lower montane forests and alluvial forests.

The length of the forewings is 9–10 mm (0.35–0.39 in).
