= Tagulandang =

Island in Indonesia

Coordinates: 2°21′N 125°25′E

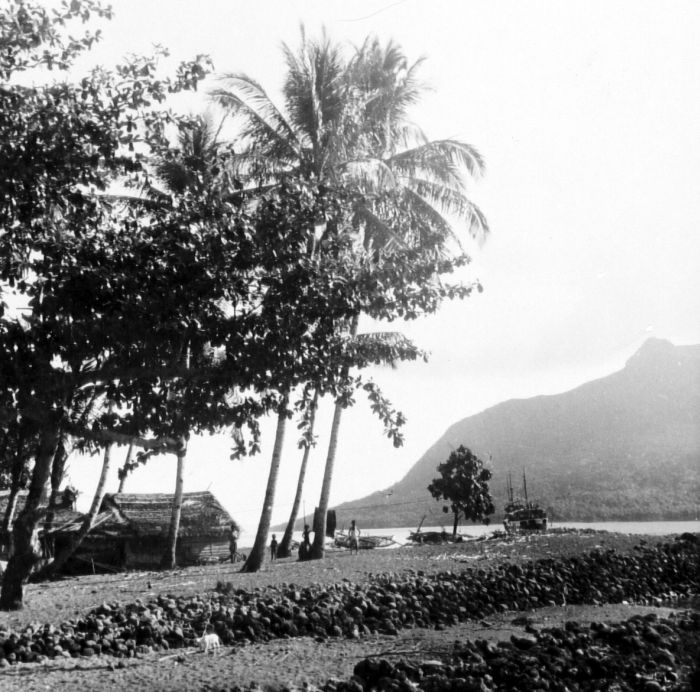
A photo from 1948

Tagulandang (Pulau Tagulandang) is one of the Sangihe Islands, situated off the northern tip of Sulawesi, Indonesia. It forms three districts in the Sitaro Islands Regency of North Sulawesi province. It is located between the Celebes and Molucca Seas, and is separated from the Ruang stratovolcano by a narrow sea channel. The inhabitants speak Sangirese, and the 2010 census recorded a population of 19,795, while the 2020 Census revealed a population of 22,296 and the official estimate as at mid 2024 was 21,544. The above figures include the area and population of the offshore island of Pulau Ruang, the fourth largest island in the Regency, which lies to the southwest of Tagulandang and contains the active Ruang stratovolcano.
