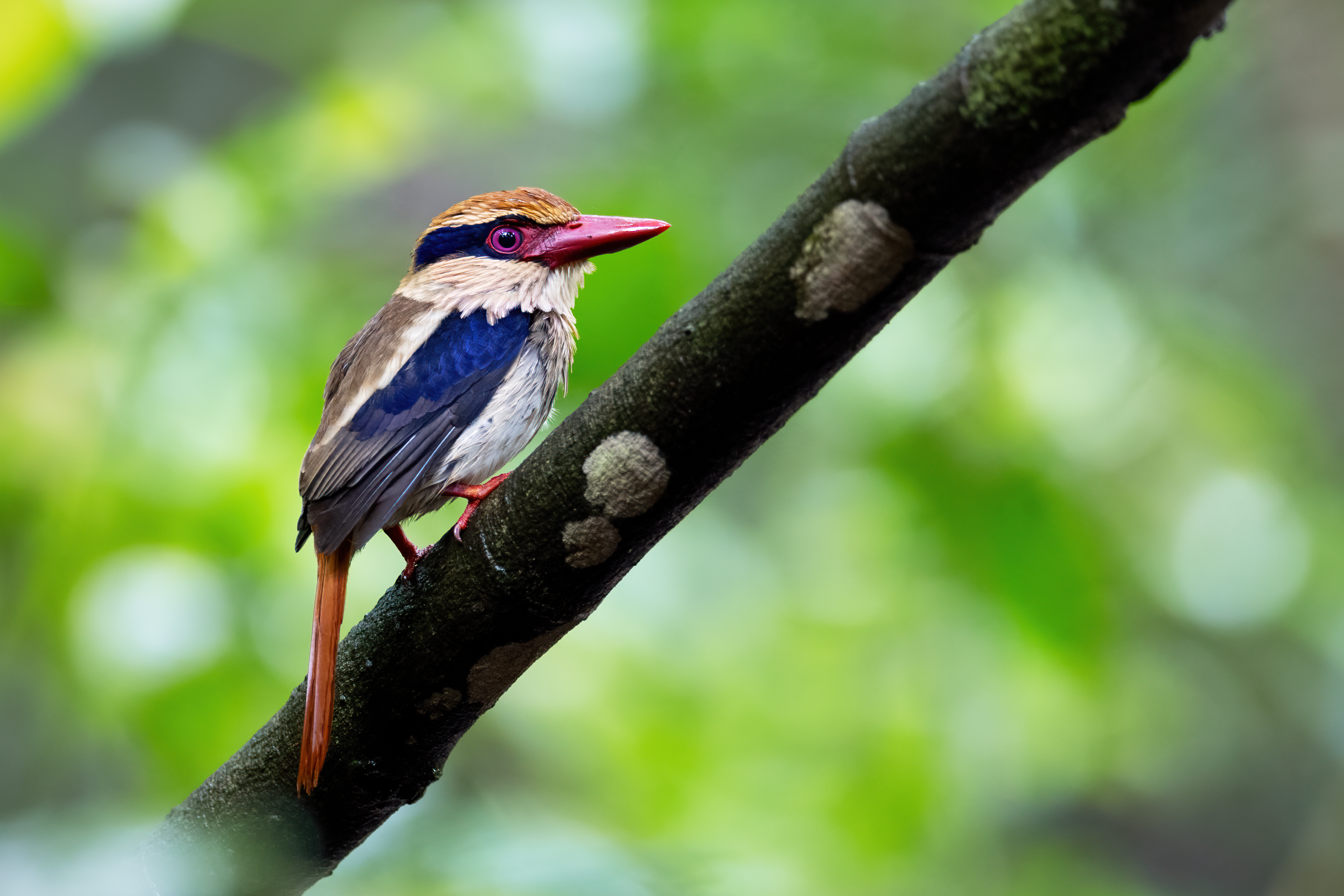
- male
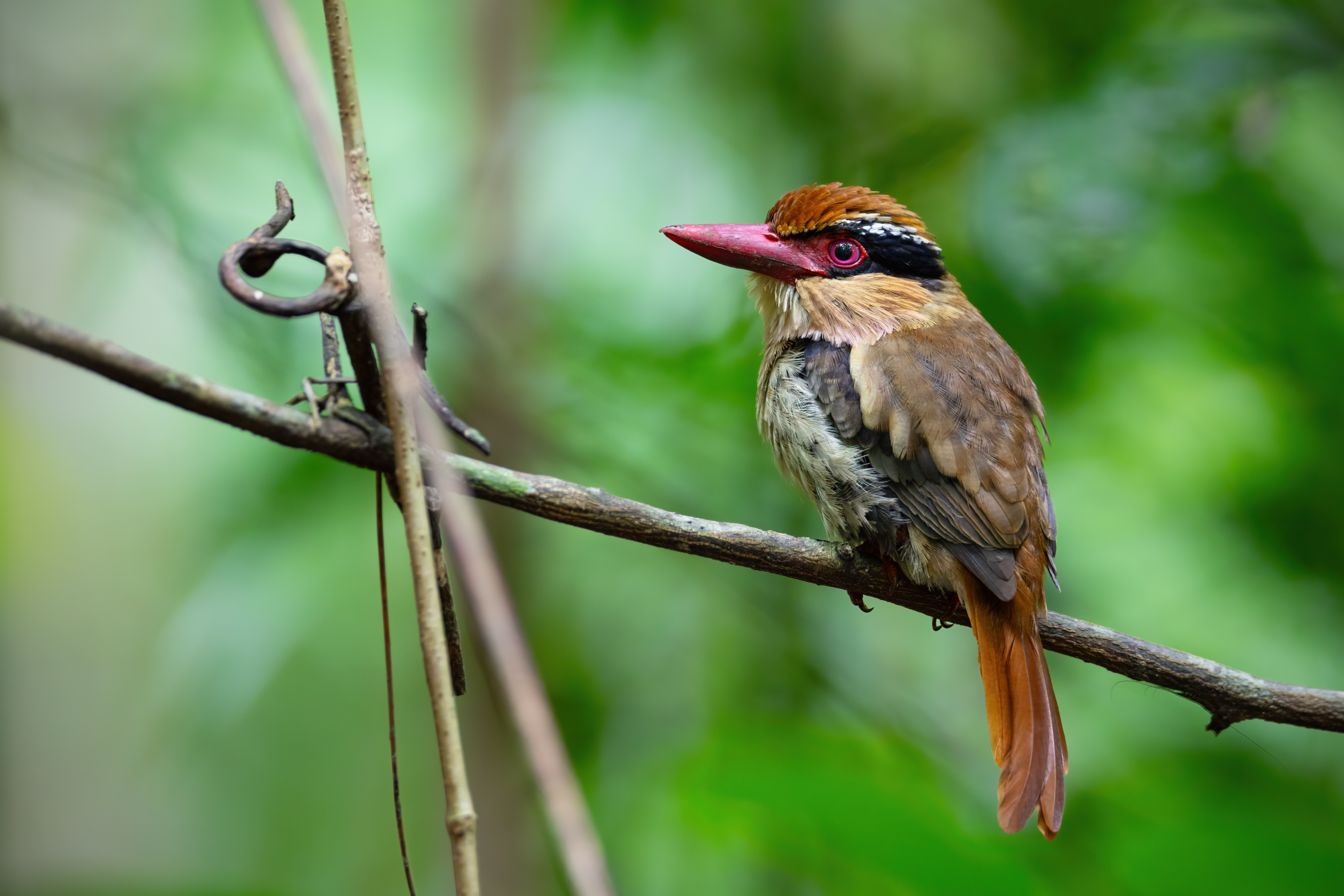
- female

Conservation status
- Least Concern (IUCN 3.1)

Scientific classification
- Kingdom: Animalia
- Phylum: Chordata
- Class: Aves
- Order: Coraciiformes
- Family: Alcedinidae
- Subfamily: Halcyoninae
- Genus: Cittura
- Species: C. cyanotis

Binomial name
- Cittura cyanotis (Temminck, 1824)

= Sulawesi lilac kingfisher =

Species of bird

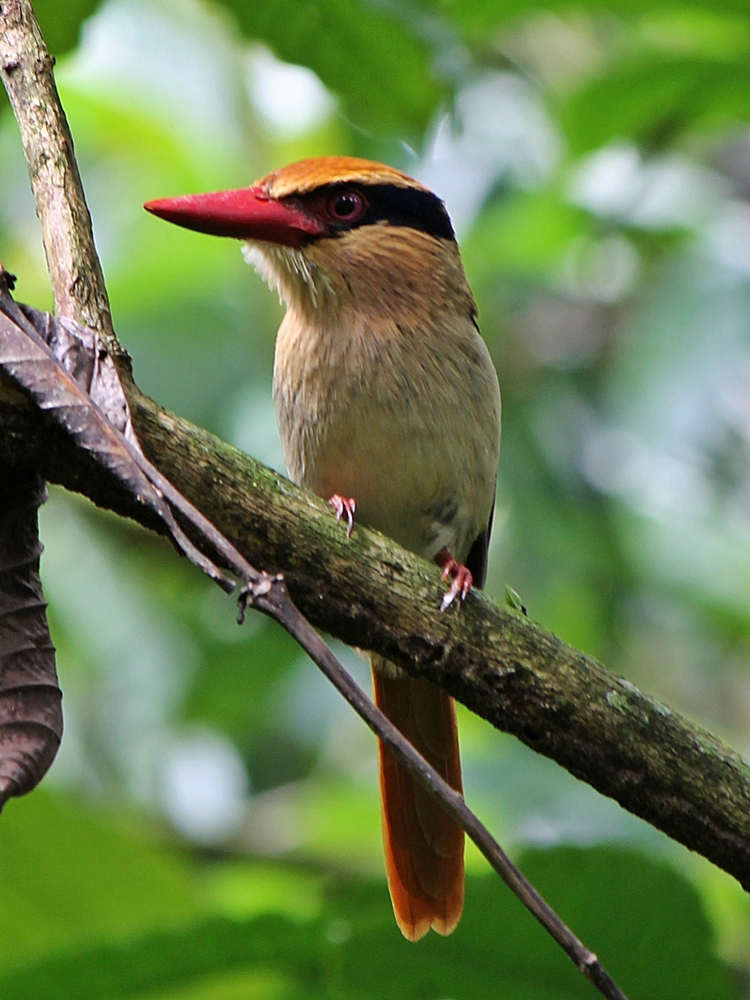
Cittura cyanotis at Bintauna

The Sulawesi lilac kingfisher (Cittura cyanotis) is a species of kingfisher in the genus Cittura, found in the lowlands of the Indonesia island of Sulawesi and Lembeh.

== Taxonomy ==
The specific epithet cyanotis is from classical Greek kuanos for "dark blue" and "-ōtis" for "eared". The first formal description of the Sulawesi lilac kingfishers were by the Dutch zoologist Coenraad Jacob Temminck in 1824 under the binomial name Dacelo cyanotis.

== Description ==
It has the typical kingfisher shape, with a short tail and long bill. The adult male has a brown crown and back and rufous rump and tail. It has a blue eye mask, separated from the crown by a white line, and a pale lilac ruff of long stiffened ear covert feathers. The underparts are white and the wings are blue, separated by a white line from the brown back. The red bill is large and flattened. In flight, the underwings are white with a black "wrist" patch.

The call is a rapid ku-ku-ku-ku.

== Behaviour ==
The Sulawesi lilac kingfisher is found in lowland rainforest and drier hill forest up to 1,000 m (3,300 ft) altitude.

It perches motionless on a low branch watching for its prey, mainly large insects, on the ground below. Little else is known of the behaviour of this species, and no nests have been found.

== Status ==
This species has a restricted range and fragmented distribution, and is uncommon, with no records from south Sulawesi. Lowland deforestation has been extensive in recent decades, and the loss of its habitat has led to lilac kingfisher being classed as near-threatened.

== Gallery ==
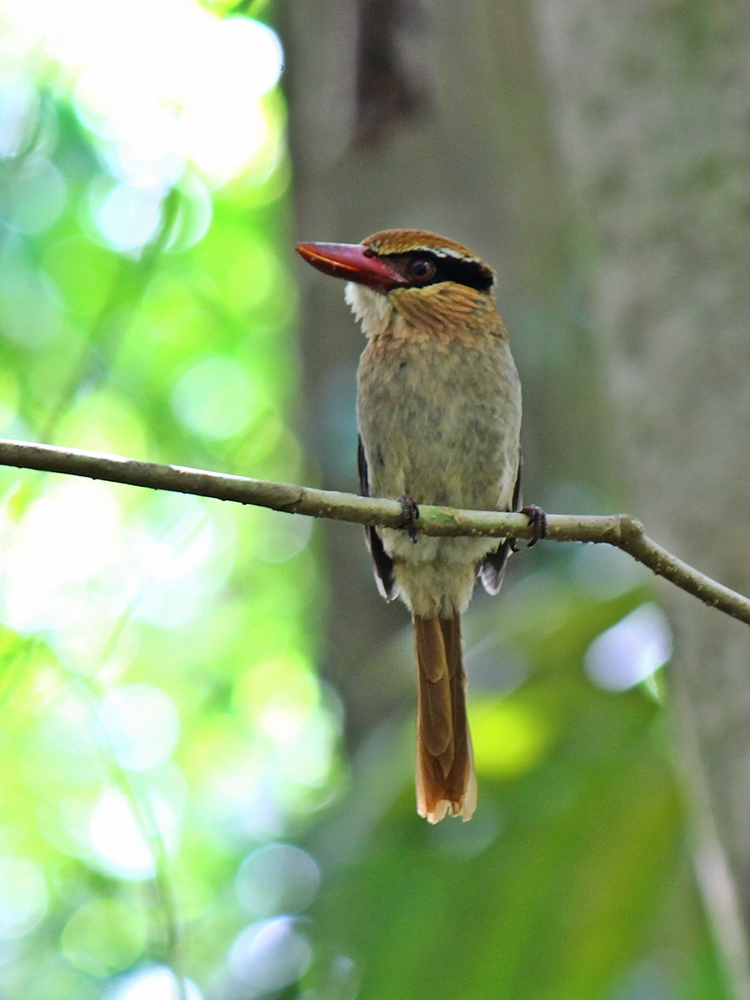
At Mt. Mahawu (1100 mdpl)

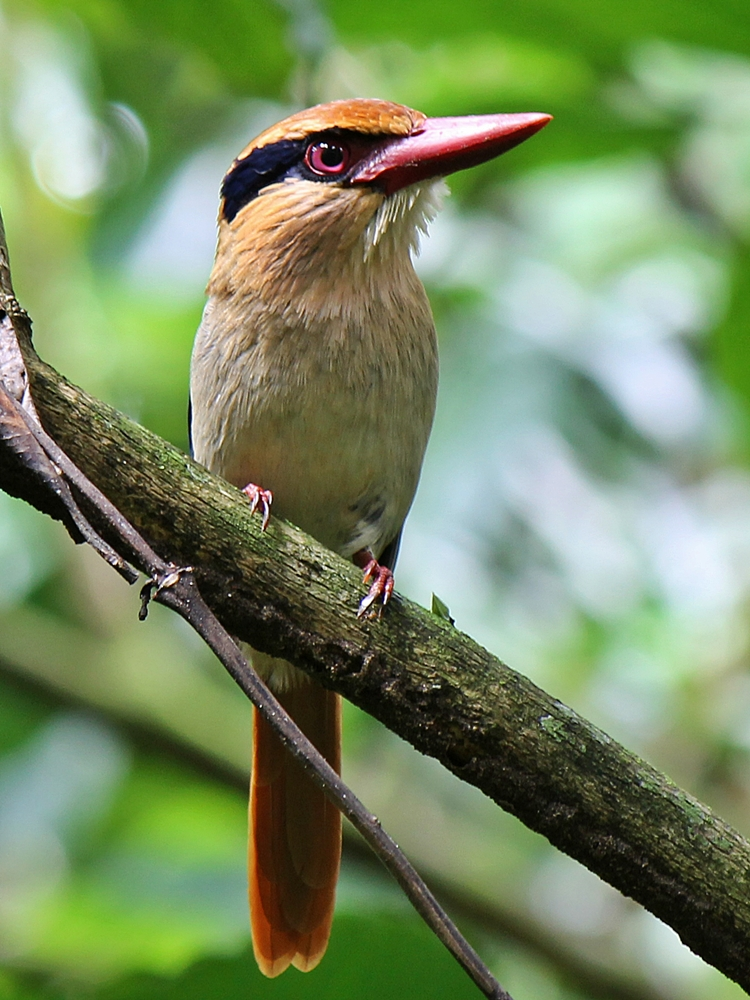
Cittura cyanotis at Bintauna, North Bolaang Mongondow

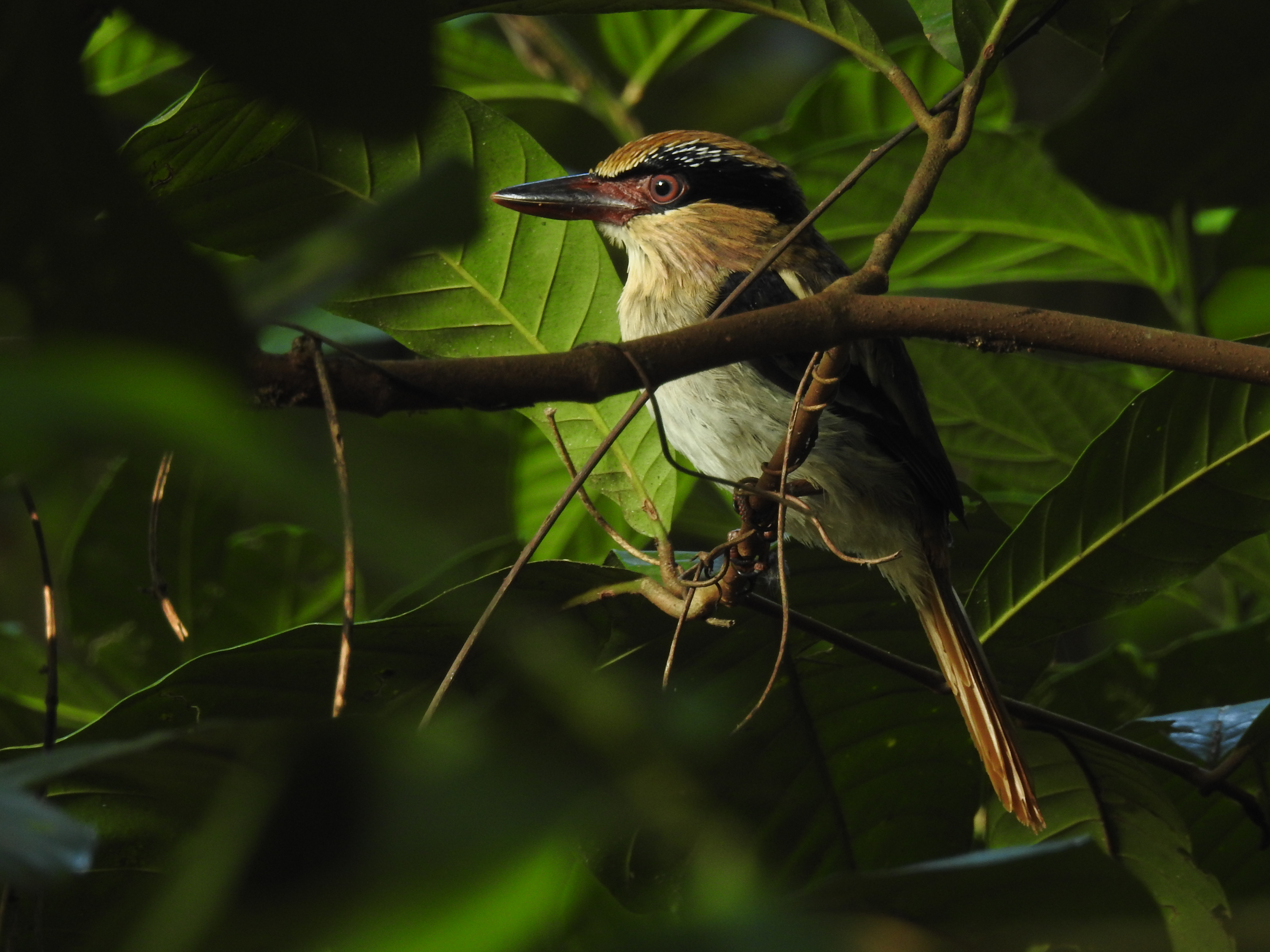
Sulawesi lilac kingfisher in Tangkoko Nature Reserve, Sulawesi
