= Siau Tagulandang Biaro Islands Regency =

Regency in North Sulawesi, Indonesia

Sitaro Islands Regency Kabupaten Kepulauan Sitaro Kabupaten Kepulauan Siau Tagulandang Biaro
- Regency
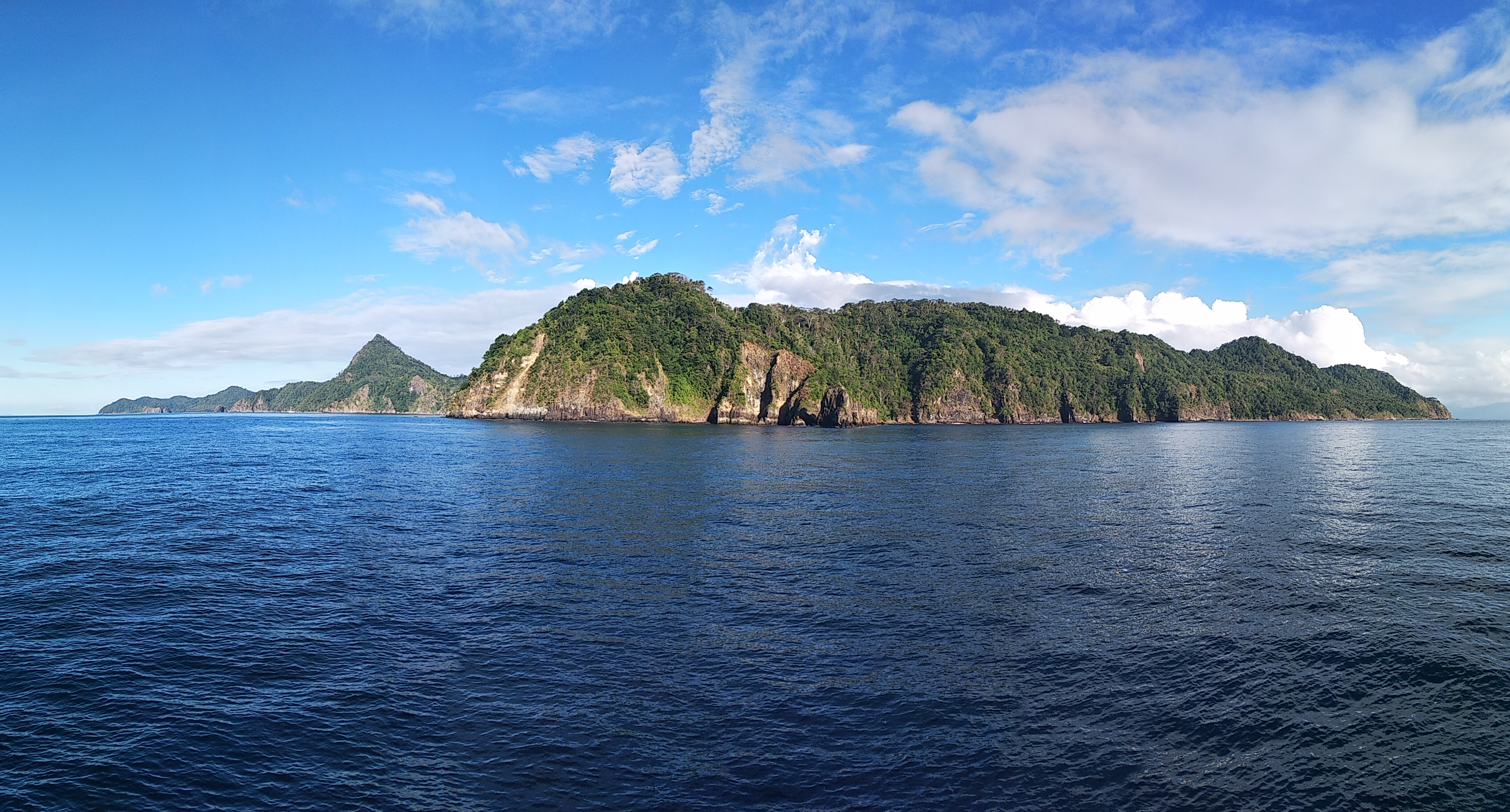
- View of Biaro Island

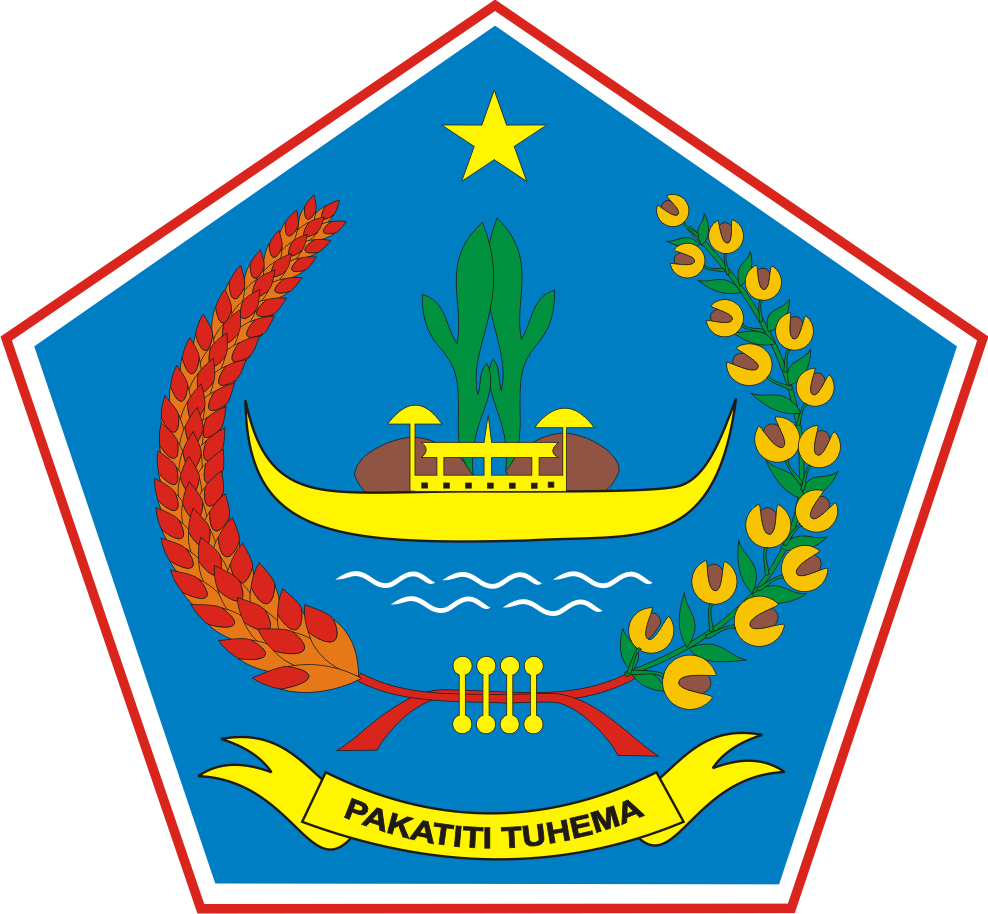
- Seal
- Motto: Pakatiti Tuhema (God's Blessing)
- Location within North Sulawesi

- Location in Sulawesi and Indonesia Sitaro Islands Regency (Indonesia)
- Coordinates: 2°45′56″N 125°24′13″E
- Country: Indonesia
- Province: North Sulawesi
- Capital: Ondong

Government
  - Regent: Chyntia Ingrid Kalangit
  - Vice Regent: Heronimus Makainas

Area
  - Total: 218.22 km^{2} (84.26 sq mi)

Population (mid 2025 estimate)
  - Total: 72,989
  - Density: 334.47/km^{2} (866.28/sq mi)
- Time zone: UTC+8 (Indonesia Central Time)
- Area code: (+62) 432
- Website: sitarokab.go.id

Sitaro Islands Regency (Indonesian: Kabupaten Kepulauan Sitaro, although its formal name is Kabupaten Kepulauan Siau Tagulandang Biaro) is a regency located off the northern extremity of Sulawesi Island in the southern Sangihe Islands, North Sulawesi Province, Indonesia. The regency was formed under Law Number 15 Year 2007 from 2 January 2007 (Indonesian: Undang-Undang Nomor 15 Tahun 2007), by separation from the Sangihe Islands Regency of which it had previously formed the southern part. The short form of the name is formed from one syllable from each of the names of the three principal islands — Siau, Tagulandang and Biaro.

The main island is Siau, while further south (nearer Sulawesi) are Tagulandang and Biaro. The regency's land area is 218.22 km^{2} and the total population was 63,801 at the 2010 census and 71,817 at the 2020 census; the official estimate as at mid 2025 was 72,989 (comprising 36,746 males and 36,243 females). Most of the population are fishermen and farmers. The religion of the majority of the population is Christianity, but there are also followers of Islam and Buddhism. The main town and administrative centre is Ondong, in West Siau.

== Administrative districts ==
The regency is divided into ten districts (kecamatan), tabulated below with their areas and their populations at the 2010 census and 2020 census, together with the official estimates as at mid 2025. The table also includes the locations of the district administrative centres, the number of administrative villages (totaling 83 rural desa and 10 urban kelurahan) in each district, and its postal codes.

Kode Wilayah	Name of District (kecamatan)	Area in km^{2}	Pop'n census 2010	Pop'n census 2020	Pop'n estimate mid 2025	Admin centre	No. of villages	Post codes
71.09.07	Biaro ^{(a)}	23.81	3,248	3,717	3,826	Lumanggo	5	95864
71.09.10	Tagulandang Selatan (South Tagulandang)	15.41	4,171	4,875	4,989	Kisihang	6	95866
71.09.03	Tagulandang ^{(b)} (West Tagulandang)	39.69	11,597	13,215	13,338	Balehumara	15 ^{(c)}	95863
71.09.06	Tagulandang Utara (North Tagulandang)	14.77	4,027	4,206	4,259	Bawoleu	6	95865
71.09.05	Siau Barat Selatan (Southwest Siau)	12.34	4,073	4,584	4,613	Mahuneni	7	95868
71.09.04	Siau Timur Selatan ^{(d)} (Southeast Siau)	21.59	7,283	8,533	8,768	Sawang	14	95867
71.09.02	Siau Barat ^{(e)} (West Siau)	16.18	7,849	8,799	8,922	Paniki	12 ^{(f)}	95862
71.09.09	Siau Tengah (Central Siau)	10.30	1,850	2,040	2,073	Beong	4	95860
71.09.01	Siau Timur ^{(g)} (East Siau)	41.16	15,816	17,610	17,719	Tarorane	16 ^{(h)}	95861
71.09.08	Siau Barat Utara ^{(i)} (Northwest Siau)	22.97	3,887	4,238	4,482	Hiung	8	95869
	Totals	218.22	63,801	71,817	72,989	Ulu Siau	94	

Notes: (a) including 20 small offshore islands. (b) including the offshore islands of Pulau Ruang (the fourth largest island in the regency, with an active volcano at its centre), Pulau Pasige and 2 smaller.
(c) includes 2 kelurahan - Bahoi and Balehumara. (d) includes the small offshore island of Pulau Batuguhita.
(e) includes the offshore islands of Pulau Makaleki and the small Pulau Batuhasaho. (f) includes 3 kelurahan - Ondong, Paniki and Paseng.
(g) including the offshore islands of Pulau Pahepa, Pulau Gunatin, Pulau Mahoro and 13 smaller.
(h) includes 5 kelurahan - Akesimbeka, Bahu, Bebali, Tarorane and Tatahadeng. (i) includes the offshore islands of Pulau Batupuki Sewenahe and Pulau Timuhe.

== Climate ==
Ondong, the seat of the regency has a tropical rainforest climate (Af) with heavy to very heavy rainfall year-round.

Climate data for Ondong
Month	Jan	Feb	Mar	Apr	May	Jun	Jul	Aug	Sep	Oct	Nov	Dec	Year
Mean daily maximum °C (°F)	29.9 (85.8)	30.1 (86.2)	30.4 (86.7)	31.2 (88.2)	31.1 (88.0)	31.0 (87.8)	30.9 (87.6)	31.5 (88.7)	31.6 (88.9)	31.6 (88.9)	31.1 (88.0)	30.4 (86.7)	30.9 (87.6)
Daily mean °C (°F)	25.0 (77.0)	26.1 (79.0)	26.3 (79.3)	26.7 (80.1)	26.8 (80.2)	26.7 (80.1)	26.5 (79.7)	26.9 (80.4)	26.8 (80.2)	26.8 (80.2)	26.7 (80.1)	26.4 (79.5)	26.5 (79.7)
Mean daily minimum °C (°F)	22.0 (71.6)	22.1 (71.8)	22.2 (72.0)	22.3 (72.1)	22.6 (72.7)	22.4 (72.3)	22.1 (71.8)	22.3 (72.1)	22.0 (71.6)	22.1 (71.8)	22.4 (72.3)	22.4 (72.3)	22.2 (72.0)
Average rainfall mm (inches)	407 (16.0)	308 (12.1)	299 (11.8)	273 (10.7)	279 (11.0)	250 (9.8)	216 (8.5)	166 (6.5)	180 (7.1)	228 (9.0)	328 (12.9)	374 (14.7)	3,308 (130.1)
Source: Climate-Data.org
