= Biaro Island =

Island in Sitaro Islands Regency, Indonesia

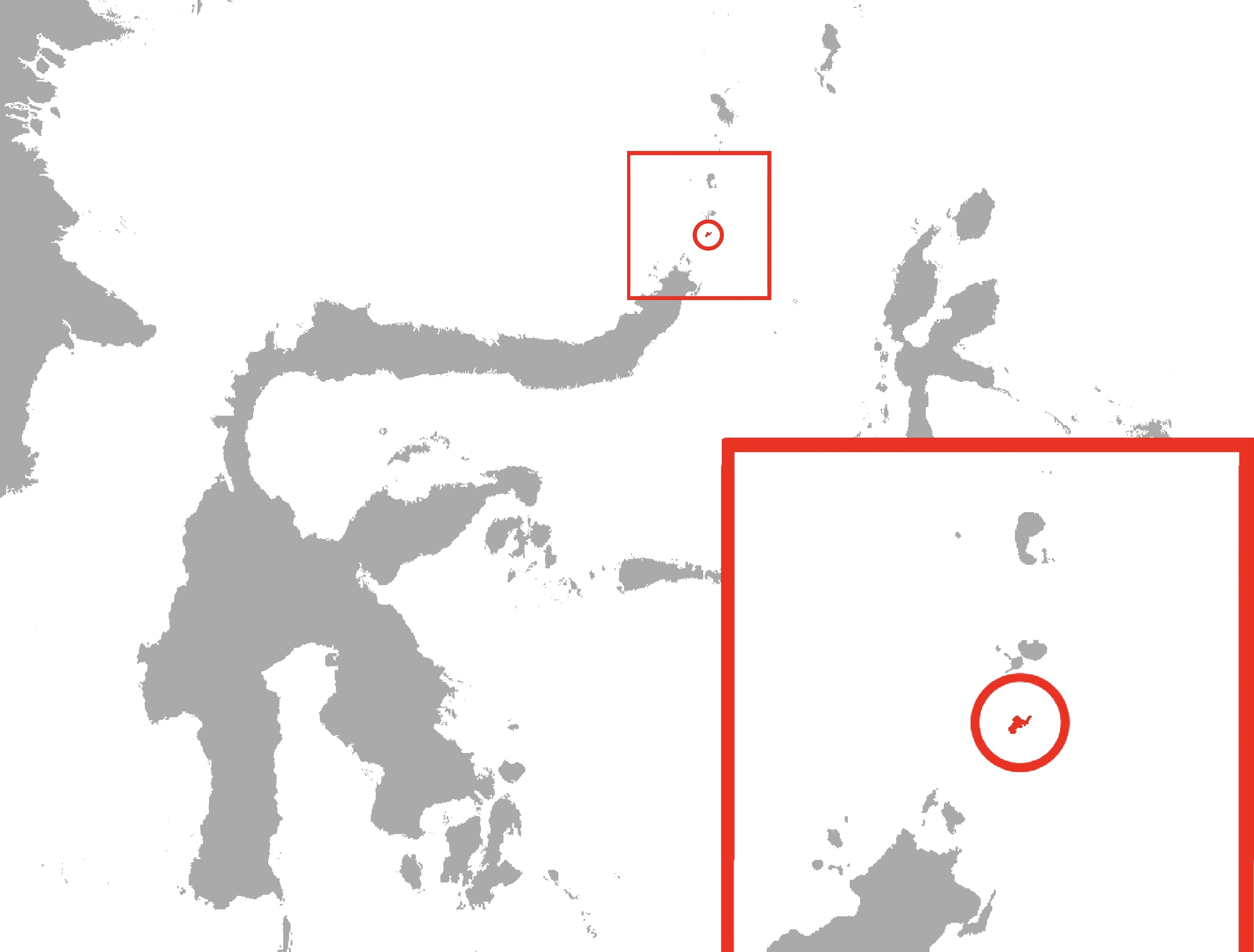
Location of Biaro island

Biaro Island, an island in the North Sulawesi sea and a part of the Sitaro Islands Regency, is located off the northern extremity of Sulawesi Island, North Sulawesi Province, Indonesia. Sitaro Islands Regency was formed under Law Number 15 Year 2007 from 2 January 2007.

Biaro Island is about 90 kilometers away from the coastal of North Sulawesi. Biaro Island is not a resort or tourist island. It had a population of 3,635 at the official estimates for mid 2024. It is remotely located with more access from Manado (on the mainland of Sulawesi) than from any other island in the regency. There are five villages at the island which are Lamanggo, Dalingsaheng, Karungo, Buang and Tope. The major religion is Protestantism.

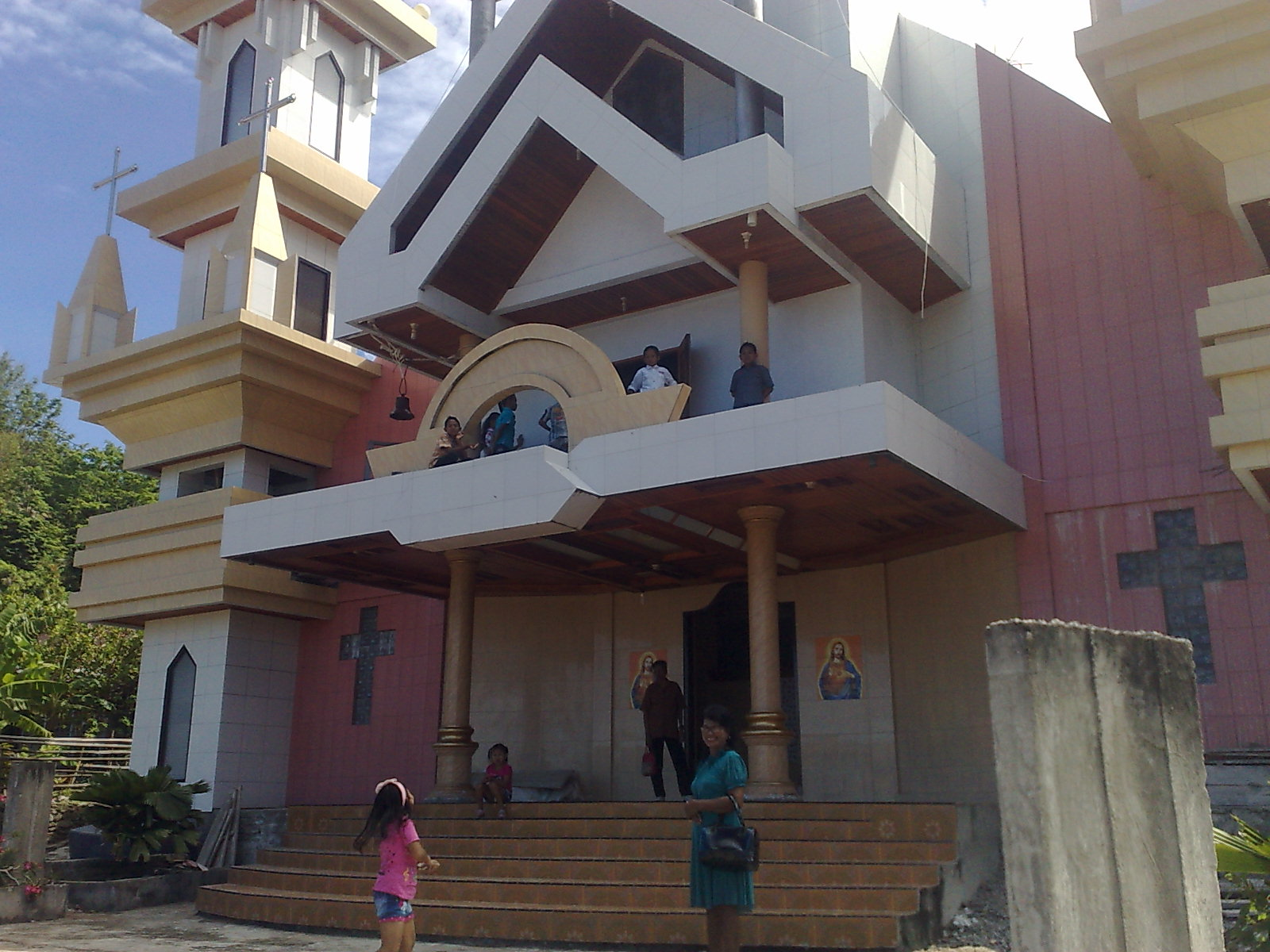
Church in Biaro Island.
