= Karangetang =

Volcano on Siau Island, Sulawesi, Indonesia

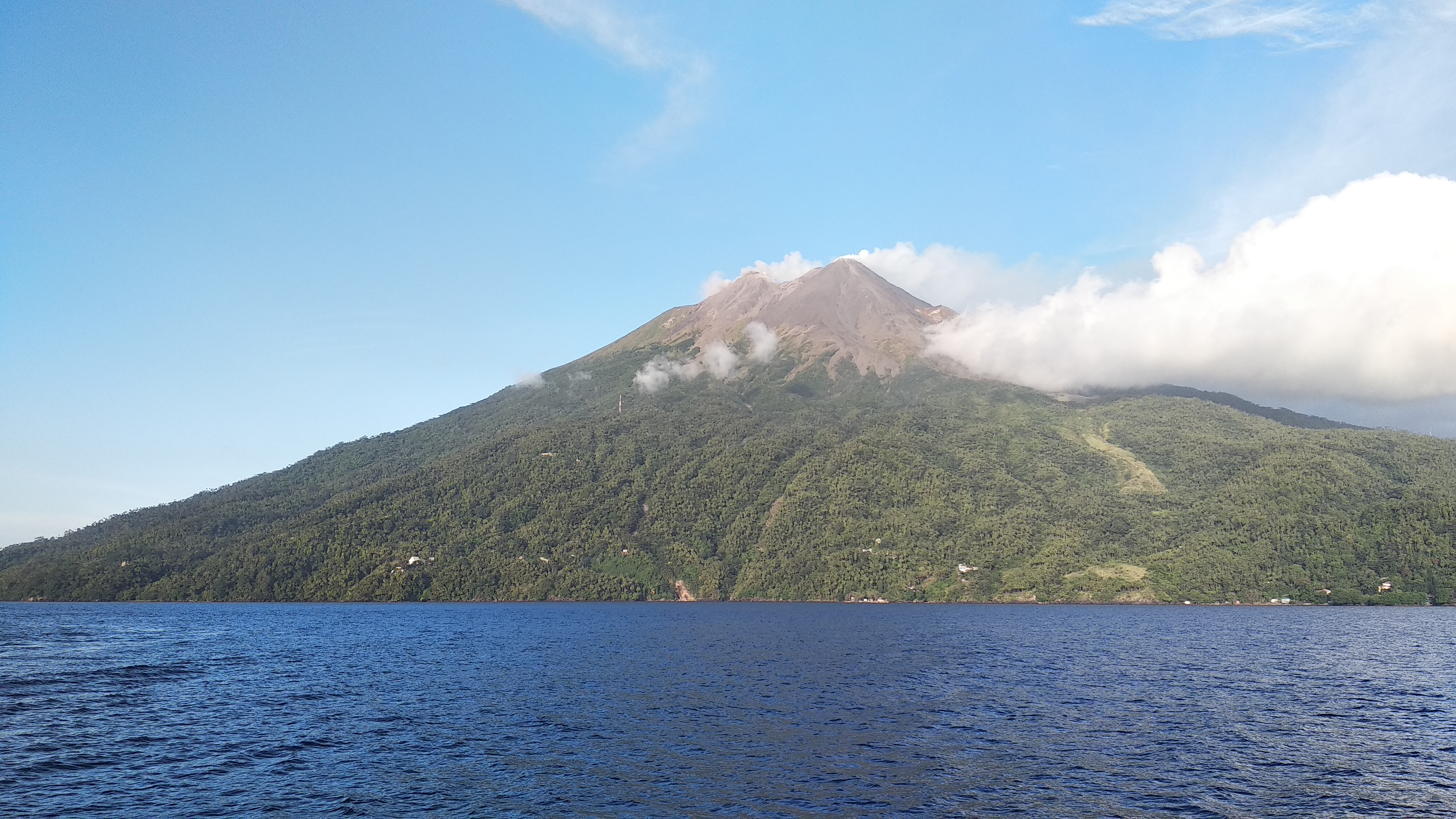
- The peak of Mount Karangetang is seen from the western side of the island of Siau.

Highest point
- Elevation: 1,827 m (5,994 ft)
- Prominence: 1,827 m (5,994 ft)
- Listing: Ultra; Ribu
- Coordinates: 2°46′40″N 125°24′27″E

Geography
- Location within Sulawesi
- Location: Siau, Indonesia

Geology
- Mountain type: Stratovolcano
- Last eruption: 2023 Nov 24 (ongoing)

Karangetang, also known as Api Siau ("Fire of Siau") is a volcano on the north side of Siau Island off the coast of Sulawesi, Indonesia. The island covers 160 km^{2}, and had 46,459 inhabitants in mid 2023. It is one of the most active volcanoes in Indonesia, having erupted 41 times since 1675. A pyroclastic flow in 1997 killed three people. Karangetang is the tallest mountain in offshore North Sulawesi, at 1827 meters above sea level.

== Current activity ==
In August 2007 an eruptive episode forced evacuations from nearby areas.

On 9 June 2009 the Volcanological Survey of Indonesia raised the eruption alert status of Karangetang to Level Orange.

On 6 August 2010 Karangetang again erupted, spewing lava and ash hundreds of meters into the air. Four villagers are missing.

On 11 March 2011, a few hours after an earthquake in Japan caused a Pacific-wide tsunami, Mount Karangetang again erupted. There were no reports of serious damage or casualties, though lava and hot gas clouds were emitted onto its slopes.

On September 2, 2013, the volcano began erupting again. There was another spell of activity from November 2018 onwards. On 20 July 2019 a new eruption started, continuing as of October 2019. This was accompanied by effusion of lava.

Dense white gas-and-steam plumes were visible from Karangetang on most days during 13-19 September, rising as high as 300 m. Seismicity during 1-7 September indicated lava from the SW side of Main Crater (S crater) continued to effuse but at a decreased rate, and that the number of earthquakes indicating avalanches had also decreased, according to Vulcanological Survey of Indonesia.

== See also ==
- Temboko Lehi Beach
- List of volcanoes in Indonesia
- List of ultras of the Malay Archipelago
- Volcanological Survey of Indonesia
- 2010 eruptions of Mount Merapi
