= Sangir Island =

Island in Indonesia

Sangihe
- Location within Sulawesi

Geography
- Location: South East Asia
- Coordinates: 3°35′N 125°30′E
- Archipelago: Sangir Islands

Administration
- Indonesia
- Province: North Sulawesi
- Largest settlement: Tahuna

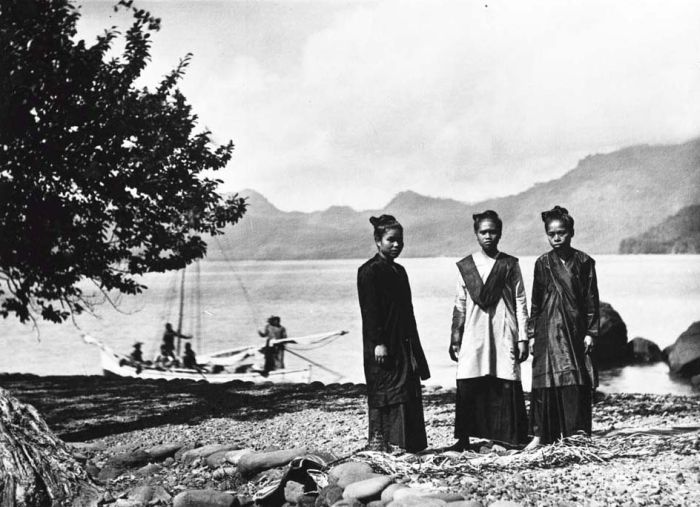
A photograph of young women in traditional dress on Sangir Island, taken circa 1900.

Sangir Besar, commonly called Sangir Island (with the spelling variants "Sangihe", "Sanghir" or "Sangi"), is an island in the Sangir Islands group. Its Indonesian name literally means "Great Sangir", in reference to the fact that it is the archipelago's main island. It is part of the North Sulawesi province. The main language is the Sangir language.

It was the scene of the violent eruption of Gunung Awu volcano on 2 March 1856. The existing mountain was reshaped by the eruption, and flooding was extensive. The death toll was estimated to exceed two thousand, possibly as high as 6,000. Other major eruptions occurred in 1966 and 2004.

The critically endangered cerulean flycatcher and Sangihe whistler are endemic to Sangir Island as is the endangered Elegant sunbird.
