= Siau Island =

Island in Indonesia

Coordinates: 2.75°N 125.4°E

Siau is an island in North Sulawesi, Indonesia, located in the Sangir Archipelago approximately 130 km (81 mi) off the northern tip of Sulawesi in the Celebes Sea. Covering a land area of 160 km^{2}, it is the main island of the Sitaro Islands Regency of North Sulawesi Province. The northern part of the island forms the volcano known as Karangetang (Api Siau), which is one of Indonesia's most active volcanoes.

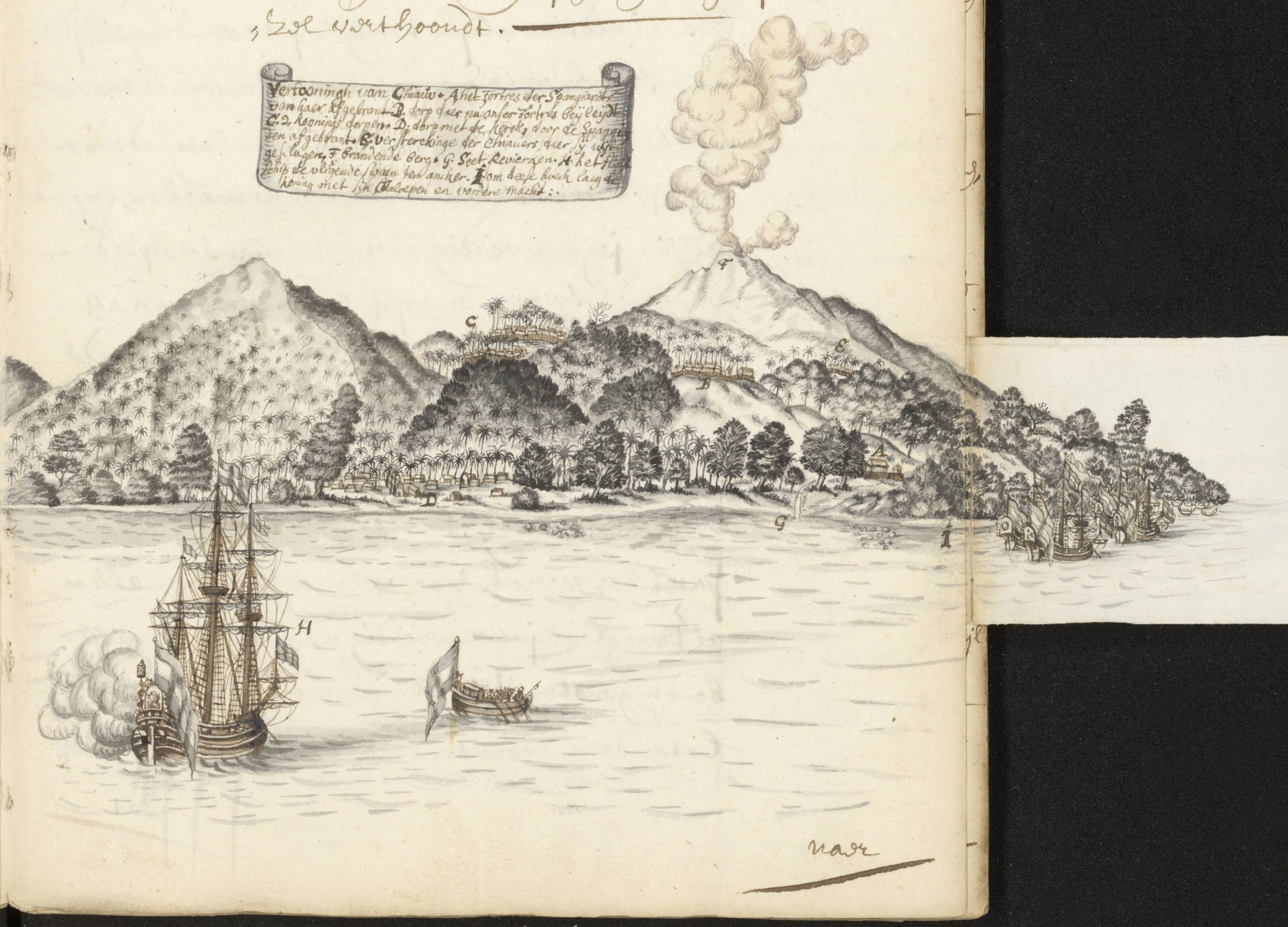
Conquest of Siau by Ternate in 1677

The population of Siau island was 40,758 at the 2010 Census and 45,804 at the 2020 Census; the official estimate as at mid-2024 was 45,349. The island has been noted as the home of the Siau Island tarsier.

== History ==
On Siau Island, the Kingdom of Siau was established in 1510 by Lokongbanua II. The kingdom maintained its seat at Paseng and lasted for over four centuries, with successive rulers listed in colonial and local records.

From at least the late medieval period, Siau was drawn into regional trade networks linking Sulawesi, Maluku, and the southern Philippines. Local rajahs maintained relationships with the neighbouring Sultanates of Ternate and Tidore.

European contact began in the 16th century with the arrival of the Portuguese, followed later by the Spanish and the Dutch. During the 17th century, the Dutch East India Company (VOC) sought to extend its influence over the Sangihe Islands as part of its efforts to control trade in eastern Indonesia.

Siau was visited by Francis Drake during his circumnavigation of the world.

In the 19th and early 20th centuries, Siau was formally incorporated into the Dutch East Indies. The traditional Kingdom of Siau formally dissolved in 1956 with the end of its last monarch's reign. It was soon integrated into modern Indonesia.

== Communities ==
Settlements on the island include the town of Ulu Siau and the villages of Baru, Batuwawang, Bebali (Bubali), Beong, Hiu, Kahawungan, Kanawong, Korakora, Lai, Lehi, Ondang, Ondong, Paniki, Pehe, Peliang, Salili, Tempuna and Toto. The island is administratively divided into 6 districts of the Sitaro Islands Regency.

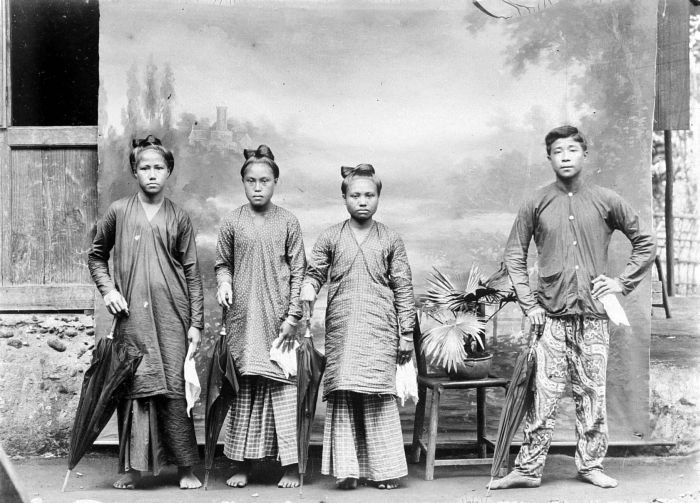
Historical photograph of Siau Islanders posing in a photo studio.

== See also ==
- Temboko Lehi Beach
- Trip to Siau Island
