= Sangihe Islands =

Group of islands in Indonesia

Coordinates: 3°00′N 125°30′E

Sangir Islands location in North Sulawesi

Sitaro Islands location in North Sulawesi

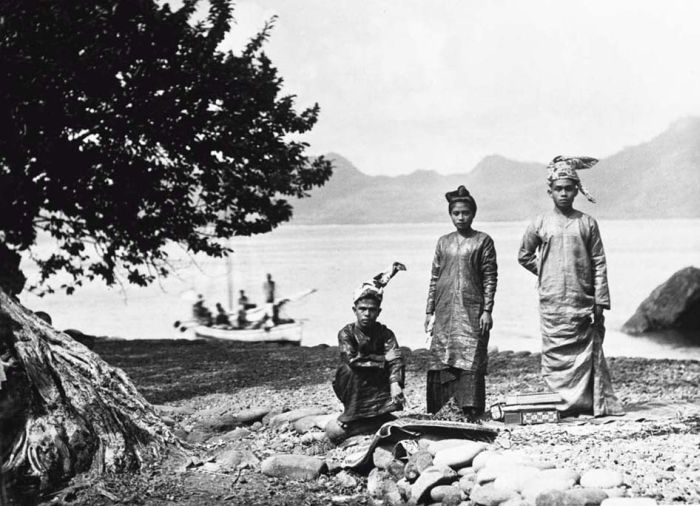
Inhabitants of the Sangir Islands in traditional costume c. 1905

The Sangihe Islands (also spelled "Sangir", "Sanghir" or "Sangi") – Indonesian: Kepulauan Sangihe – are a group of islands that constitute two regencies within the province of North Sulawesi, in northern Indonesia, the Sangihe Islands Regency (Kabupaten Kepulauan Sangihe) and the Sitaro Islands Regency (Kabupaten Siau Tagulandang Biaro). They are located northeast of Sulawesi between the Celebes Sea and the Molucca Sea, roughly halfway between Sulawesi and Mindanao, in the Philippines; the Sangihes form the eastern limit of the Celebes Sea. The islands combine to total 813 square kilometers (314 sq mi), with many of the islands being actively volcanic with fertile soil and mountains.

The main islands of the group are, north to south, Sangir Besar (or Sangir Island), Siau (or Siao), Tagulandang, and Biaro. The largest island is Sangir Besar and contains an active volcano, Mount Awu (1,320 meters (4,330 ft)). Tahuna is the chief town and port, also hosting the islands' sole airport, Naha Airport.

The area came under Dutch control in 1677 and became part of Indonesia when it declared independence from the Netherlands in 1945.

The Sangir language is spoken in the islands; this Austronesian language is also spoken in some islands in the Philippines, and on the extreme northern tip of Sulawesi.

The Sangihe tectonic plate is named after the island arc and is very active.

On 2 January 2007, the Sitaro Islands (named for Siau, Tagulandang, and Biaro Islands) became a new regency by separation from the Sangihe Islands. The population for these island groups was 189,676 at the 2010 Census, comprising 126,133 in the Sangihe Islands Regency and 63,543 in the Sitaro Islands Regency; the official estimate as of mid-2022 was 212,682, comprising 140,165 in the Sangihe Islands Regency and 72,517 in the Sitaro Islands Regency.

== Marore Island ==
Marore Island is one of the coordinate points in the Sangihe Islands used to determine the baselines of Indonesia. 15 years ago the practice of illegal fish bombing damaged the coral and mangrove ecosystems. In 2012, recovery of coral was observed, but not yet for mangroves.

== See also ==
- List of extinct birds
